= Red Pepper (musical) =

1921 musical

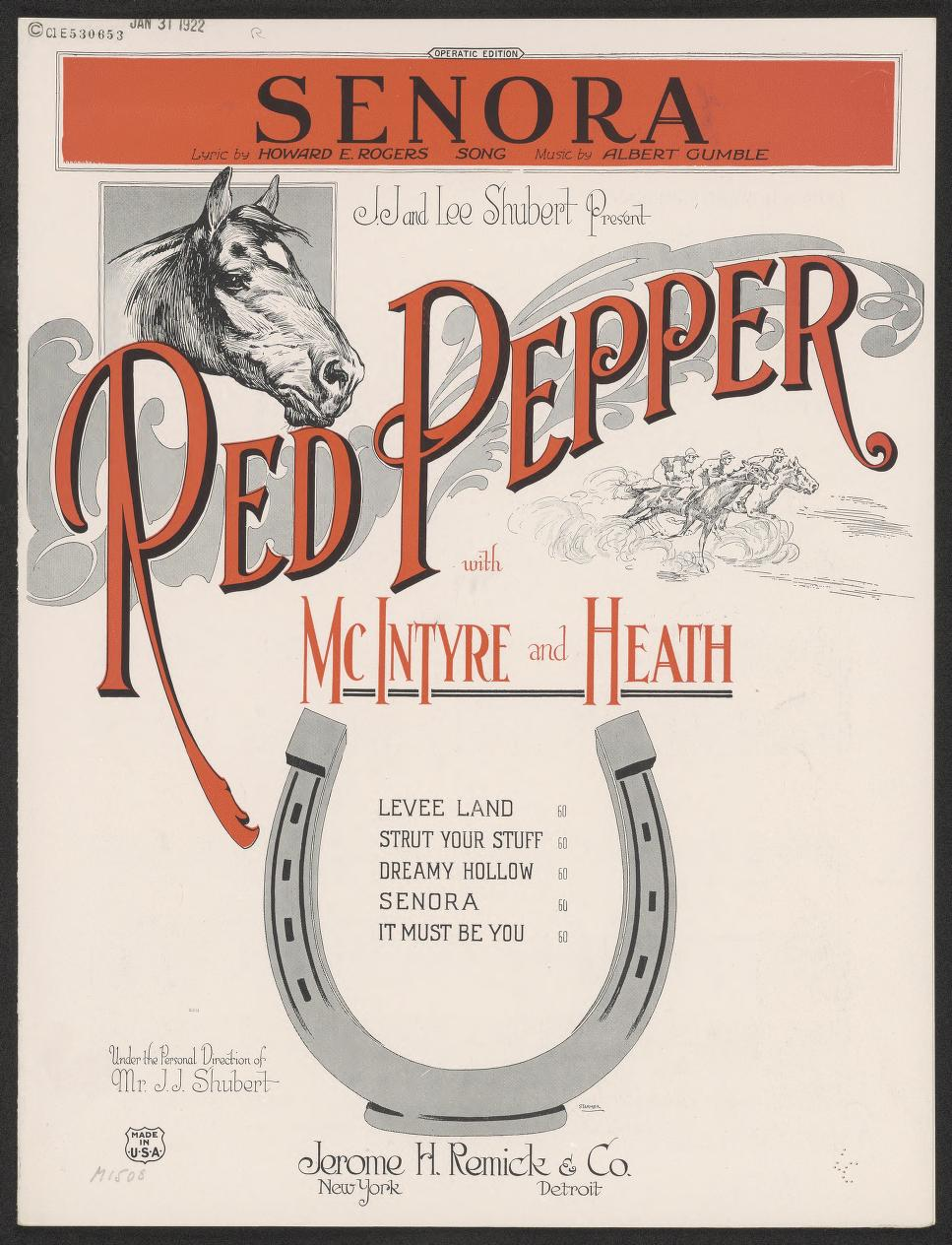
Front cover of the 1922 sheet music for the song "Senora" from the Broadway musical Red Pepper. Music by Gumble and lyrics by Howard Emmett Rogers. Published by Jerome H. Remick.

Red Pepper is a musical in two acts with music by Albert Gumble and Owen Murphy, lyrics by Howard Emmett Rogers, and a book by Edgar Smith and Emily Young. Staged on Broadway in 1922 after a premiere in Baltimore in 1921, the musical was created for the comedy duo of McIntyre and Heath, who were famous for their performances in blackface.

Set at a racetrack in Havana, Cuba, and in the Southern United States, Red Pepper takes its title from a race horse who is featured in the musical's storyline. It was one of the earliest musicals to use a musical score rooted in jazz, marking a shift away from operetta and ragtime which had dominated the musical theatre landscape previously in the 1910s and into the early 1920s.

== Plot ==
At a racetrack in Havana, Cuba, Juniper Berry and Jimpson Weed conspire to get rich quick by influencing the outcome of an impending horse race. They bet against the favored winner, the thoroughbred horse Red Pepper, with the intent of drugging the horse to prevent it from winning the race. Their plans get sidetracked and several side adventures occur. The pair follow the horse to Arizona and then Georgia in the hopes of successfully implementing their scheme.

== History ==
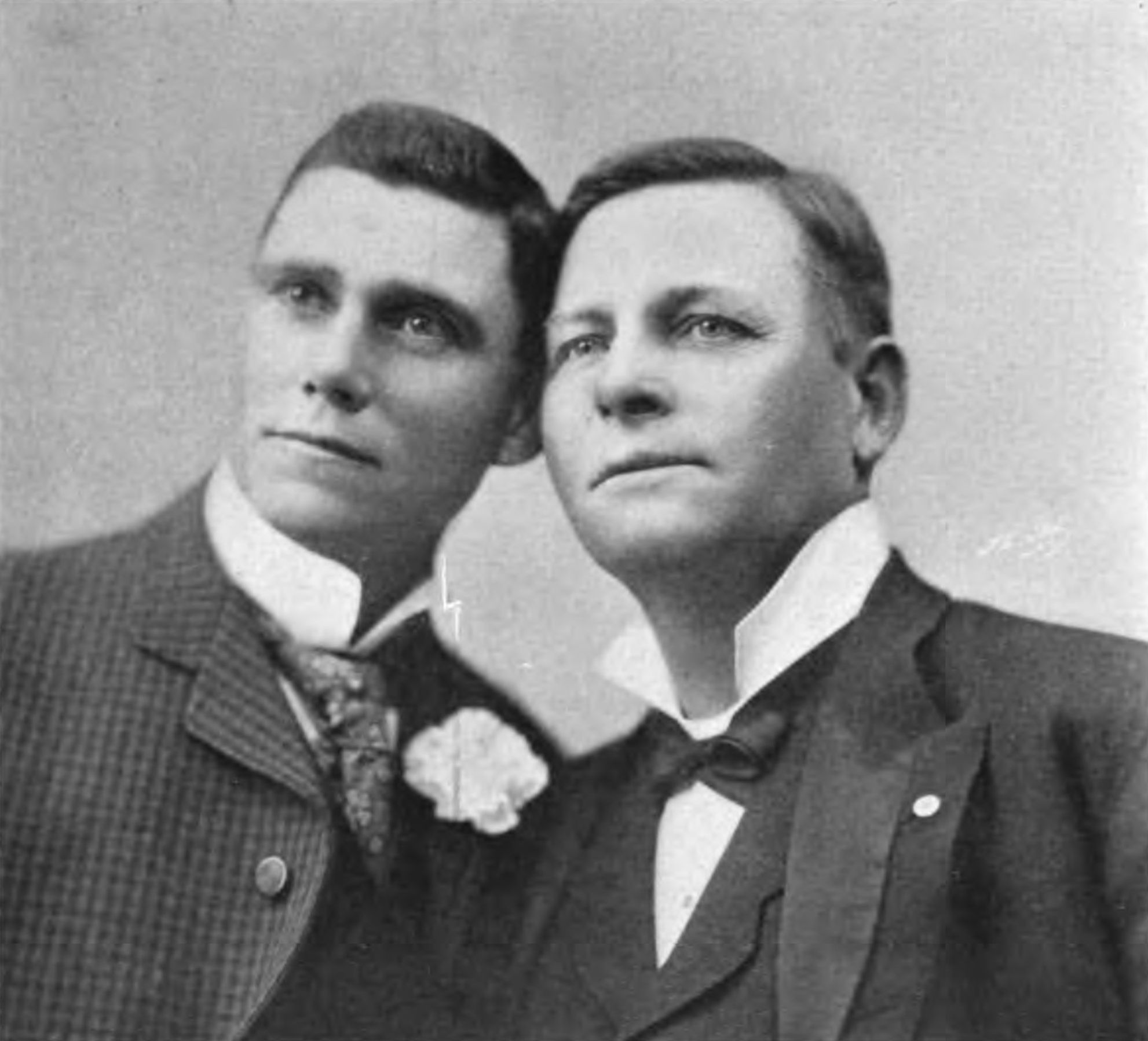
Photograph of McIntyre and Heath from 1908

Theatre scholars John Bush Jones and Nathan Hurwitz describe Red Pepper as a "leisure-time musical", a type of musical common in the 1920s which set its story in the world of sports and leisure-time activities familiar to American audiences of the period. In this case, the musical's first act was set at a racetrack in Havana, and the choice to place the musical in this context was partially due to the recent popularity of Man o' War, a thoroughbred race horse, who had captured the American consciousness in the 1920s.

Producers Lee and Jacob J. Shubert oversaw the creation of Red Pepper as a starring vehicle for the comedy duo of McIntyre and Heath. As with their previous musicals, such as The Ham Tree and In Hayti, Red Pepper was crafted around their blackface tramp personas that they originally created in minstrel shows in the late 19th century and had then transferred into the mediums of vaudeville and the Broadway musical. Thomas Kurton Heath portrayed Jimpson Weed, a "Colored Gentleman of Misfortune", and James McIntyre performed the role of Juniper Berry, a "Get-Rich-Quick Wallingford of the Colored Race"; a pair of tramps who scheme together to get rich quick off the racehorse "Red Pepper".

Directed by Frank Smithson, Red Pepper premiered in Baltimore on November 28, 1921, at the Auditorium Theatre. The production then went on tour, arriving at Broadway's Shubert Theatre on May 29, 1922. It ran there for just 24 performances, closing on June 17, 1922. Despite its relatively short run in New York, the work had a long life as a touring show at theaters nationally, and was financially profitable for its producers. The cast also included actor Dan Quinlan in the role of Col. Shelby Bright.

== Critical reception ==
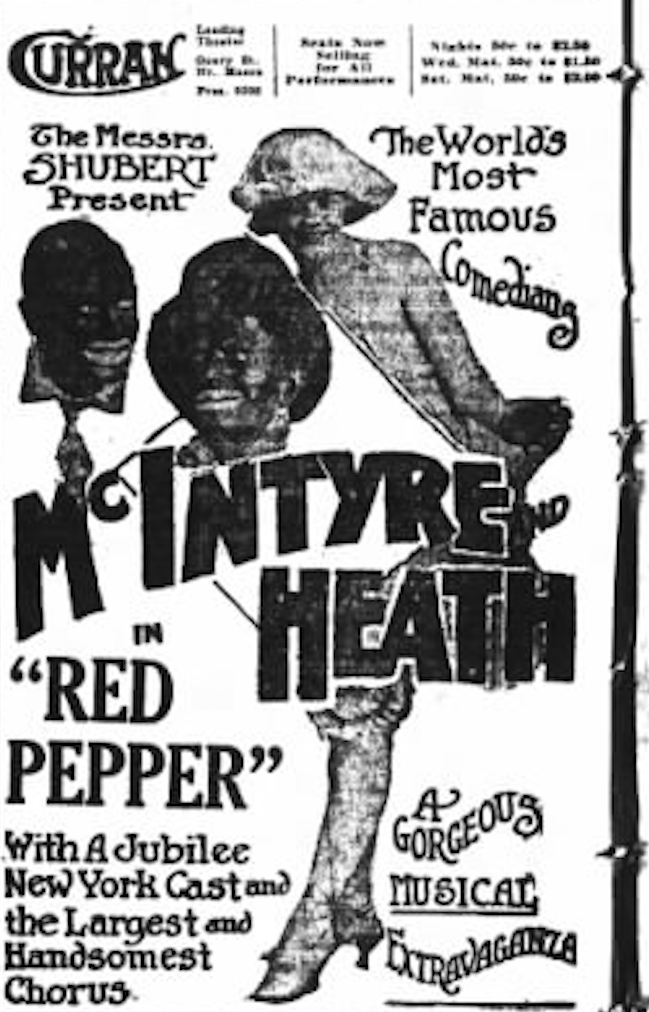
1923 advertisement for Red Pepper published in the San Francisco Chronicle

Critics of Red Pepper were largely critical of the plot, which lacked a focused storyline and had a loose structure which was targeted at featuring the wide variety of talents among its cast. The New York Evening World said "the plot was terrible" but hailed the show as "a novelty" for its combination of the aesthetics of a Wild West show and a minstrel show. Likewise, The Brooklyn Daily Eagle described the musical as a "hybrid concoction" of "burlesque, vaudeville, circus, Cheyenne roundup, Winter Garden extravaganza, and high grade cabaret".

Red Pepper was written at a time when jazz was beginning to change the music composition aesthetic of the Broadway musical; a change which caught at least one critic by surprise. This sudden shift in musical tastes was reflected in the review of Gumble and Murphy's jazz rooted score in the New York Post whose critic wrote, "There's nothing in the piece that is real music. Jazz, yes. Any amount of it, but jazz isn't music. Not by a long shot."

As forward thinking as the musical score was for its period, the comedic writing was less so. The New York Times critic wrote,

To comment on the work of the well known pair who head the cast, [McIntyre & Heath], is superfluous. They get the laughs with the lines they have – they would get more laughs with better lines. Some of their jokes – well, they really should give that one about the whole shirt on the back a bonus and let it retire. And while they are about it they might provide for some more veterans. Why don't they form an old-jokes home and make them all comfortable?

Despite this negative criticism, Heywood Broun was much more complimentary of McIntyre & Heath's comedy in his review in the New York World, and found the pair "funnier than ever". Likewise, The Brooklyn Daily Eagle review described the pair as "two bright ebony spots in the long and variegated performance."

The New York Times review gave high praise to the performance of actress Mabel Elaine in the blackface role of Lilly Rose, particularly citing the strength and appeal of her singing and dancing in the songs "Bugaboo" and "Strut Your Stuff".
