= Owen Murphy (songwriter) =

American songwriter (1893–1965)

Owen Murphy (September 2, 1893 – April 3, 1965) was an American songwriter, film maker, and writer for radio, film, and theatre. He worked as a lyricist, composer, and playwright for Broadway musicals and as a songwriter for Tin Pan Alley in the 1920s and 1930s. As a film maker he was an early maker of industrial films. He also was a writer for comedian Joe Cook for both the stage and radio.

== Early life and education ==
Owen Murphy was born on September 2, 1893, in Mount Clemens, Michigan. He earned a Bachelor of Arts degree from the University of Notre Dame and a Juris Doctor degree from the University of Pittsburgh School of Law. A self-taught composer, he became a member of the American Society of Composers, Authors and Publishers in 1928.

== Later life and career ==
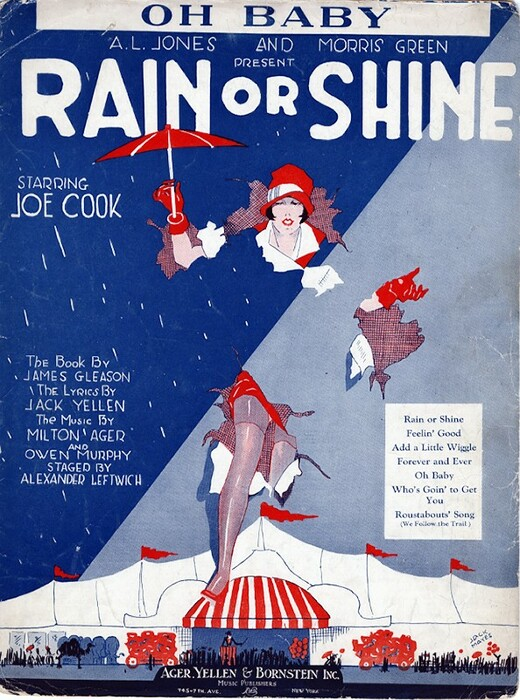
Front cover of sheet music for the song "Oh Baby" by composers Owen Murphy and Milton Ager and lyricist Jack Yellen from the musical Rain or Shine (1928, Ager, Yellen & Bornstein).

Murphy began his career as a songwriter for Broadway in 1921 with the show The Mimic World for which he co-authored the music with Jean Schwartz and Lew Pollack, and both the lyrics and book with Harold Atteridge and James Hussey. This was followed by the musical Red Pepper which was staged at the Shubert Theatre in 1922. For this show, Murphy co-authored the music with Albert Gumble and the lyrics with Howard Emmett Rogers. Gumble and Murphy's score was rooted in jazz at a time when musical tastes on Broadway were just beginning to shift in that direction. Their forward thinking score shocked the reviewer in the New York Post who criticized their music for its embrace of that music genre.

Murphy was co-lyricist with Eugene Conrad for the 1924 musical Top-Hole at the Fulton Theatre, and that same year was a contributing lyricist to the musical revue Artists and Models at the Astor Theatre. He was a contributing writer to both the book and lyrics of The Earl Carroll Vanities of 1925. That same year he co-wrote both the music and lyrics for The Greenwich Village Follies with Harold Levey. He collaborated with Levey again on both the music and lyrics for the 1926 musical Rainbow Rose which was staged at the Forrest Theatre. With composer Milton Ager he co-wrote the music to the 1928 musical Rain or Shine which was written as a starring vehicle for comedian Joe Cook.

With Robert A. Simon, Murphy co-wrote the lyrics to the musical The Gang's All Here which was staged at the Imperial Theatre in 1931. He was a composer and lyricist for, Hold Your Horses (1933, Winter Garden Theatre), in collaboration with many other contributing creatives. It too was a musical crafted specifically for Joe Cook. Murphy went on to write regularly for Cook as both a song and script writer for his performances on both stage and radio in the 1930s.

Murphy was the founder of Owen Murphy Productions, and was a pioneer maker of industrial films. After marrying Marion Murphy (née Herson), he lived first in Ho-Ho-Kus, New Jersey, and then Stone Harbor, New Jersey. The couple had two sons and a daughter together. A Roman Catholic, he was a member of St. Paul Church of St. Brendan the Navigator Parish in Stone Harbor.

Murphy died on April 3, 1965, in Stone Harbor at the age of 71.

== Bibliography ==
- Baillie, Laureen, ed. (1998). "Murphy, Owen". American Biographical Index: Mead-Pflaummer. Vol. 7. K.G. Saur.
- Benjamin, Ruth; Rosenblatt, Arthur (2006). Who Sang what on Broadway, 1866-1996: The singers (A-K). McFarland & Company. ISBN 9780786421893.
- Bennett, Robert Russell (1999). Ferencz, George Joseph (ed.). The Broadway Sound: The Autobiography and Selected Essays of Robert Russell Bennett. University of Rochester Press. ISBN 9781580460224.
- Bloom, Ken (1996). American Song: Songwriters, The complete companion to Tin Pan Alley Song. Schirmer Books.
- Bordman, Gerald Martin; Norton, Richard (2010). American Musical Theatre: A Chronicle. Oxford University Press. ISBN 9780199729708.
- Dietz, Dan (2019). The Complete Book of 1920s Broadway Musicals. Rowman & Littlefield Publishers. ISBN 9781442245280.
- Green, Stanley (1984). The Great Clowns of Broadway. Oxford University Press. ISBN 9780195034714.
- Hischak, Thomas S. (2009). Broadway Plays and Musicals: Descriptions and Essential Facts of More Than 14,000 Shows Through 2007. McFarland & Company. ISBN 9780786453092.
