= Frank Saddler =

American orchestrator, music arranger, composer and conductor

Frank Saddler (9 September 1864 – 25 March 1921, Brewster, New York) was an American orchestrator, music arranger, composer, and conductor. Born and raised in Western Pennsylvania and educated in Munich, Germany, he is best known for his work on Broadway as an orchestrator and arranger. Between 1909 and 1921 he orchestrated the scores to more than sixty Broadway musicals; an "unprecedented accomplishment that has never been repeated". George Gershwin described Frank Saddler as "the father of modern arranging", and his contribution to the American music theatre canon was a forerunner to the development of the "modern American sound" in later composers like Aaron Copland, Virgil Thompson, Roy Harris, and Marc Blitzstein.

== Early life in Pennsylvania ==
Saddler was born in Franklin, Pennsylvania on 9 September 1864. He was the youngest of three boys born to John and Hannah Saddler. His father was an oil drilling engineer who was serving in the 9th Pennsylvania Cavalry Regiment during the American Civil War around the time of Frank's birth.

Saddler spent the first eight years of his life in rural Northwest Pennsylvania. When he was born, the Saddler family was most likely residing on a farm in Cornplanter Township. While still a young child, the family migrated to Limestone Township, Warren County where John was employed on an oil farm. There the Sadler family became members of the Harmony Society (HS); a Christian pietist society in which its members lived a communal life forgoing all personal property. Frank's early childhood was spent in this pious environment where he attended both school and church services run by the HS.

In 1872, when Frank was eight years old, the Saddler family left Limestone for Verona, Pennsylvania, just thirteen miles northeast of downtown Pittsburgh. There the family lived at a house at 18 Clawson Street. Frank resided in Verona for the next twelve years, and was educated at Second Ward School in Verona. At the age of 20 he began working at a music store owned by prominent Pittsburgh businessman George Kappel. Around this time he began performing in a variety of chamber music and orchestra concerts in Pittsburgh as a violist, violinist, oboist, and bassoonist; ultimately organizing and leading his own concert series as leader of the Poco-a-Poco Orchestra.

It is possible, although not certain, that he may have received his early music instruction from Thomas F. Kirk; a prominent Pittsburgh conductor who was director of Pittsburgh's Philharmonic Society.

== Education in Munich ==
As Saddler became more involved with music circles in Pittsburgh, he drew the attention of the wife of Pittsburgh physician Dr. J. S. Walters who became a vocal public champion of Saddler among Pittsburgh's high society. Through her efforts raising money among Pittsburgh's elite, most notably from philanthropist C. W. Batchelor and fellow Pittsburgh musician Carl Retter, Saddler was provided with funds to study music in Munich, Germany.

Saddler left the United States for Munich in August 1889. There he studied harmony, counterpoint, composition, and conducting with Joseph Stich (1850–1914); a conductor at the National Theatre, Munich who is best remembered for composing the one act opera Der Geiger zu Gmünd which premiered at the Stadttheater Düsseldorf in 1875. Due to Stich's association with the National Theatre, Saddler attended numerous opera performances during his time in Munich and interacted with many of musicians and other artists connected to that institution; experiences which he later carried with him into his work in the American theatre.

During his second year of studies with Stich he composed Phantasia (later retitled Phantasie Stück); a six minute long work for string quartet and orchestra in which the string quartet played with mutes in order to differentiate the sound between it and the orchestra. This work was premiered in 1890 by the Bürger-Sänger-Zunft München. This work proved to be well received, and he conducted the work in several more concerts in Munich along with other works he composed during this period.

The reputation Saddler gained from Phantasia earned him his first commission as a composer. The Allotria club, an organization whose members included many of Munich's leading intelligentsia, hired him to compose a work for one of their concerts. The resulting work was an symphonic work in two movements entitled Zwei Stücke aus “Erinnerung an das Kaiserthal” für Jagdhörner that was intended as a tone poem representation of the Kaisertal valley in the Eastern Alps.

This work was followed by Klänge aus Amerika (English: Sounds of America) in which Saddler arranged a 15 minute long orchestral medley of American songs that included patriotic music and spirituals among other traditional American works. It was premiered by the German military band Erste Infanterie-Regiments König under the direction of Adolf Fach to an enthusiastic reception from the press and several leading music figures in Munich with conductor Hermann Levi in his review comparing it favorably to Johannes Brahms's Liebeslieder Waltzes. The work was published in both piano and orchestral versions by Josef Seiling in 1891, and enjoyed a period of popularity in Germany during the 1890s.

While studying with Stich, Saddler periodically wrote news items about happenings in Munich for The Pittsburgh Dispatch; acting as a correspondent for that paper. These included often humorous reviews of opera productions at the Bavarian State Opera. He also formed friendships with prominent Munich musicians, including opera singer Gustav Siehr and conductor Franz Fischer among others. At the completion of his studied in Munich, a farewell concert consisting of only Saddler's music was given on May 25, 1892, at the concert hall of the Academy of Fine Arts, Munich.

== Return to America and initial work as an itinerant musician ==
After returning to the United States, Saddler was hired as the musical director and resident composer of the Murray-Lane Opera Company; a light opera company led by soprano Clara Lang and her husband, the baritone J. K. Murray. The company opened with an adaptation of Irish playwright Edmund Gurney's Glendalough for which Saddler served as music director and contributed some original music. This work premiered in Baltimore at Ford's Grand Opera House in November 1982. It then toured the United States with stops including performance runs at McVicker's Theater in Chicago The Star Theater in Buffalo, New York, Broadway's Fourteenth Street Theatre, the Grand Opera House in Brooklyn, the Columbus Theatre in Upper Manhattan, and the Empire Theatre in Philadelphia.

By January 1894 Saddler had left his position with the Murray-Lane Opera Company. This was likely due to personal circumstances involving a woman named Clara (surname unknown) whom Saddler had gotten pregnant out of wedlock. Records from the 1900 United States census indicate that Frank married Clara Saddler sometime between June 1894 and June 1895, and their son Frank Saddler Jr. was born on 8 October 1894. Saddler scholar Eric Davis thinks it likely the marriage occurred sometime before the birth of Frank Jr. between June and September 1894.

== Partial list of Broadway credits ==
- Broadway to Tokio (1900), music arranger
- Sergeant Kitty (1904), orchestrator
- The Shepherd King (1904), music arranger
- Piff! Paff!! Pouf!!! (1904), orchestrator
- In Hayti (1909), orchestrator
- The Jolly Bachelors (1910, orchestrator)
- The Summer Widowers (1910, orchestrator)
- The Bachelor Belles (1910, orchestrator)
- The Hen-Pecks (1911, orchestrator)
- The Three Romeos (1911, orchestrator)
- The Man from Cook's (1912, orchestrator)
- The Passing Show of 1912 (1912, orchestrator)
- Ziegfeld Follies of 1912 (1912, orchestrator)
