= Tell It to the Marines (disambiguation) =

"Tell it to the Marines" is an idiom. The phrase may also refer to:

- Tell It to the Marines (1918 film), starring Jane Lee
- Tell It to the Marines (1926 film), starring Lon Chaney, William Haines and Eleanor Boardman
- Tell It to the Marines (TV series), a British sitcom that aired from 1959 to 1960

== See also ==
- Tell That to the Marines, World War I Al Jolsen song
- Leave It to the Marines, 1951 American film
