= Jean Schwartz =

Hungarian-American composer and pianist (1878–1956)

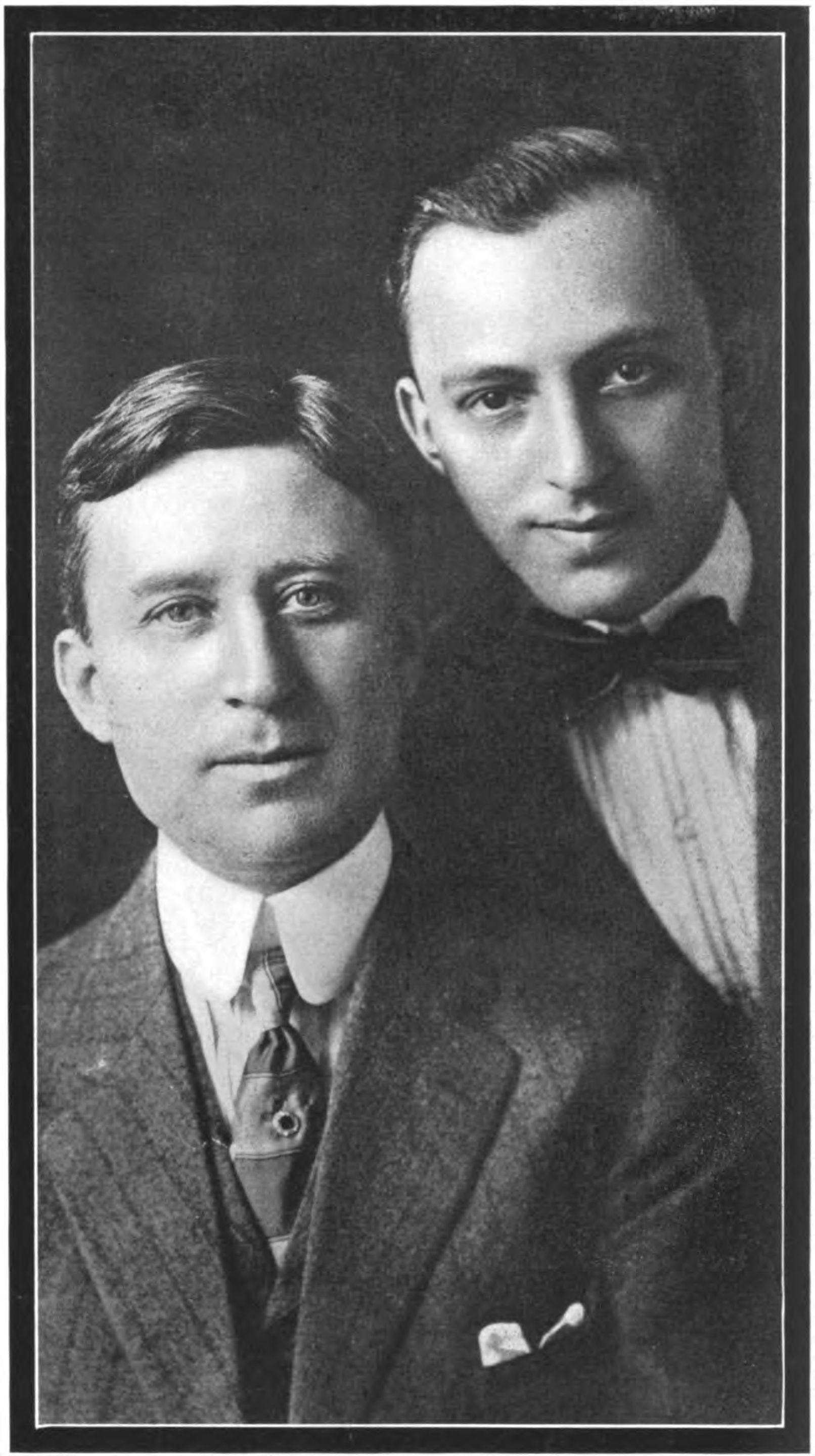
William Jerome (left) and Jean Schwartz (right), 1909

Jean Schwartz (November 4, 1878 – November 30, 1956) was a Hungarian-born Jewish American composer and pianist. He is best known for his work writing the scores for more than 30 Broadway musicals, and for his creation of more than 1,000 popular songs with the lyricist William Jerome. Schwartz and Jerome also performed together on the vaudeville stage in the United States; sometimes in collaboration with Maude Nugent, Jerome's wife, and the Dolly Sisters. Schwartz was married to Jenny Dolly from 1913 to 1921.

With Jerome, Schwartz created a large body of work for both Broadway and Tin Pan Alley, with the majority of their songs written between the years 1901 and 1910. Many of their popular songs were interpolated into Broadway musicals created by others during the 1900s, 1910s, and 1920s. The pair were also the primary creators of eight Broadway musicals, the most successful of which were Piff! Paff!! Pouf!!! (1904) and The Ham Tree (1905). Their most enduring song, "Chinatown, My Chinatown", was written in 1906, interpolated into their final musical together, Up and Down Broadway (1910), and became a jazz standard when a series of recording artists, including Louis Armstrong and Fletcher Henderson, made popular recordings of the work. Their collaborative output slowed significantly after 1910 and came to an end during World War I.

While Schwartz was mainly concerned with writing the music to his songs, he did on occasion work as a lyricist as well. He was a founding member of the American Society of Composers, Authors and Publishers in 1914. Schwartz formed a prolific partnership with the lyricist and playwright Harold Atteridge with whom he created more than a dozen Broadway musicals. Many of these shows were also made with the composer Sigmund Romberg. The trio of Schwartz, Atteridge, and Romberg created five of The Passing Show musical revues together as well as the musicals Monte Cristo, Jr. (1919) and Innocent Eyes (1924). Schwartz also created several Broadway musicals in collaboration with the lyricist Alfred Bryan; sometimes in conjunction with Atteridge as musical book writer.

Schwartz collaborated with many other songwriters during his lengthy career. He wrote the 1918 popular standard "Rock-a-Bye Your Baby with a Dixie Melody" with Sam M. Lewis and Joe Young. In 1930, he intentionally ended his career as a New York City based songwriter with the aptly named "Au Revoir Pleasant Dreams", a work which became the theme song for Ben Bernie and his orchestra. After this, he lived in retirement in Los Angeles and was mostly finished with music making. His final song of significance, the 1937 popular standard "Trust in Me", was written in collaboration with Milton Ager and Ned Wever. That song has been recorded by numerous artists, most recently by Beyoncé for the 2008 film Cadillac Records. He was posthumously inducted into the Songwriters Hall of Fame in 1970.

== Early life and career ==
Jean Schwartz was born into a Jewish family in Budapest, Hungary on November 4, 1878. At the age of 13, he immigrated with his family to the United States and settled with them in New York City. The family lived on the East Side, and he studied the piano under his older sister, Rosa, who had trained as a pianist under Franz Liszt.

After working for a time as an office boy at a cigar factory and as an attendant at a Turkish bath house, Schwartz obtained employment in the sheet music department of the Siegel-Cooper Company, where his job was to play songs on the piano for customers in order to sell the sheet music. It was while working in this job that he published his first song, the ragtime piece "Dusky Dudes' Cakewalk", in 1899. Other music jobs he held in his early years included working as a pianist with an orchestra at Coney Island and as a song-plugger for the Shapiro-Bernstein Publishing House of Tin Pan Alley.

Schwartz became a citizen of the United States in 1902. In 1914, he was one of the twelve founding members of the American Society of Composers, Authors and Publishers.

== Work with William Jerome ==
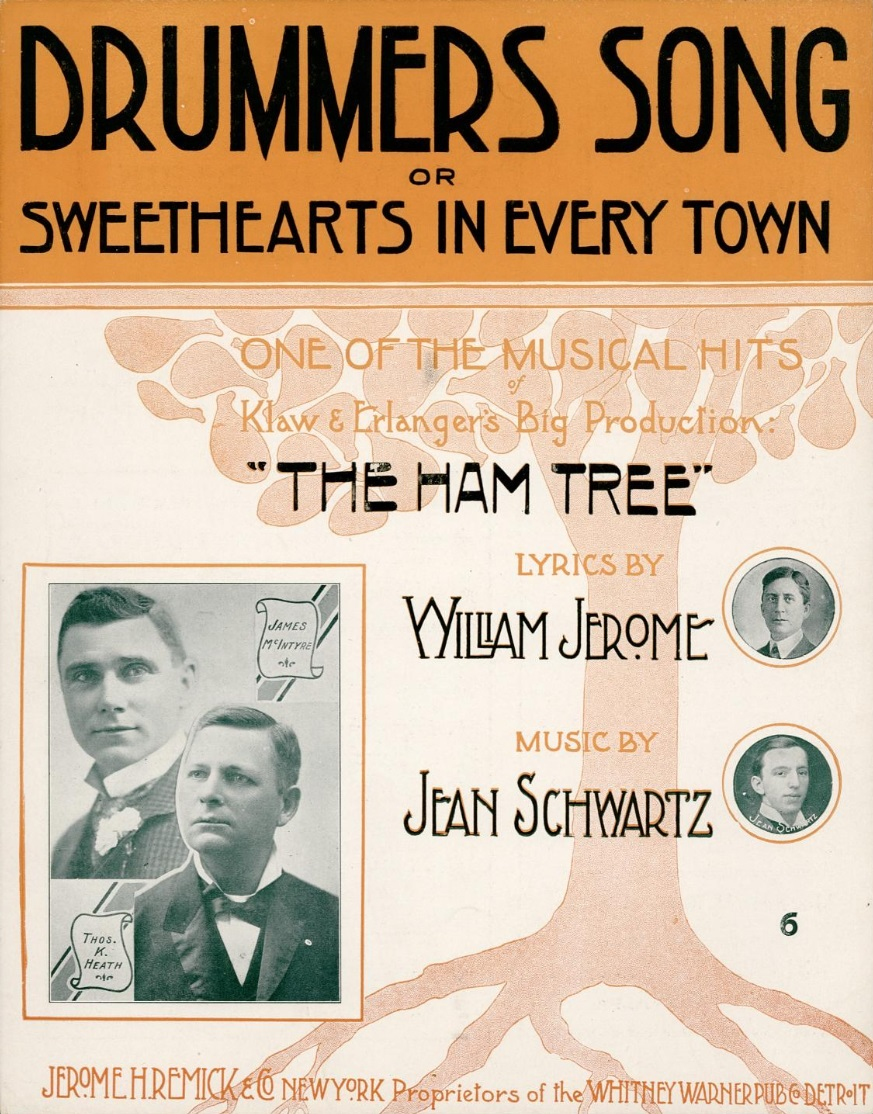
Front cover of the sheet music for "Drummers Song" from Schwartz and Jerome's The Ham Tree.

Schwartz remained at the Siegel-Cooper Company until 1901 when he took a job as the on-stage pianist in John Stromberg's Broadway musical Hoity Toity at Weber & Fields Music Hall. His energy and enthusiasm on stage attracted the attention of the show's librettist, William Jerome, and the two ended up becoming friends. In the midst of Hoity Toity's run, the two men wrote their first song together, "Mr. Shakespeare Comes to Town", and the tune was added into that production under the pseudonym John Black. It was a popular hit with audiences.

Schwartz went on to write more than 1,000 popular songs with Jerome; many of them written for or first performed on the Broadway stage. The pair regularly contributed additional songs and other material to musicals primarily written by others. One of their early songs, "Mr. Dooley", was first performed in George Dance and Howard Talbot's musical A Chinese Honeymoon (1902), and was a popular enough hit that it was also included in the first musical version of The Wizard of Oz (1902). Most of their early songs were comedic works; including musical theatre songs written for the comedians George M. Cohan, Al Jolson, Eddie Foy, Harry Bulger, and Thomas Q. Seabrooke. The pair then began to expand their repertoire into writing ballads, with an important early success being the song "Bedalia" written for Blanche Ring in Reginald De Koven and George V. Hobart's The Jersey Lily (1903). This song's sheet music sold more than three million copies. The pair also contributed songs to the Ziegfeld Follies, among other shows.

In 1903, Schwartz and Jerome wrote their first of eight musicals together where they were the primary authors, Mrs. Delaney of Newport. This was followed by their biggest success as musical theatre writers, Piff! Paff!! Pouf!!!, in 1904. The song "Radium Dance" from this show was inspired by scientist Marie Curie, and the musical was a big hit for its stars, Eddie Foy and Alice Fischer. They scored another popular hit with the musical The Ham Tree, which was created for the vaudeville stars James McIntyre and Thomas Heath. A tremendous success, the production toured for seven years and was later periodically revived by McIntyre and Heath.

Schwartz and Jerome's other show from 1905, Lifting the Lid, was their first collaboration with the playwright John J. McNally. McNally penned the books to several other Schwartz and Jerome Broadway musicals, including Fritz in Tammany Hall (1905), Lola from Berlin (1907), and In Hayti (1909). Their final musical together, Up and Down Broadway (1910), included their biggest hit as songwriters, "Chinatown, My Chinatown". Originally written in 1906, this song was interpolated into the musical. This song, however, did not become a popular hit until it was recorded by the American Quartet and Billy Murray in late 1914 on their number one selling record. It then became a jazz standard and was recorded by numerous artists over the next several decades; among them Louis Armstrong and Fletcher Henderson.

Schwartz and Jerome also wrote several popular songs not attached to musicals. Their 1901 comedic song "Rip Van Winkle Was a Lucky Man" was a hit for both African-American singer Sherman H. Dudley, and Jerome's wife, Maude Nugent. Their song "Dear Sing Sing" (1903) was a hit for Billy Murray who recorded the song multiple times. Their comedic song "I'm a Member of the Midnight Crew" (1909) became a hit for several performers of the era; including Carter DeHaven and Eddie Morton. Some of their other hit songs included "Since Sister Nell heard Paderewski Play" (1901), "I'm Unlucky" (1902) "Hamlet Was a Melancholy Dane" (1902), "Cordelia Malone" (1904), and "The Hat My Father Wore on St. Patrick's Day" (1909), among many others.

After 1910, Schwartz and Jerome's collaborative output significantly dropped as they began to increasingly pursue projects independent of one another; and despite briefly operating their own publishing firm in the years leading up to World War I, their partnership came to an end during the war years. However, songs the pair had written earlier in their career continued to be interpolated into musicals, and performed by recording artists after their partnership had ended. The pair re-united briefly in 1921 with the song "Molly on a Trolley by Golly With You", which was published by M. Witmark & Sons.

Schwartz and Jerome were also active as performers on the vaudeville stage together, and they sometimes worked in collaboration with Maude Nugent and the Dolly Sisters. Jenny Dolly was Schwartz's first wife.

== Other work on Broadway ==
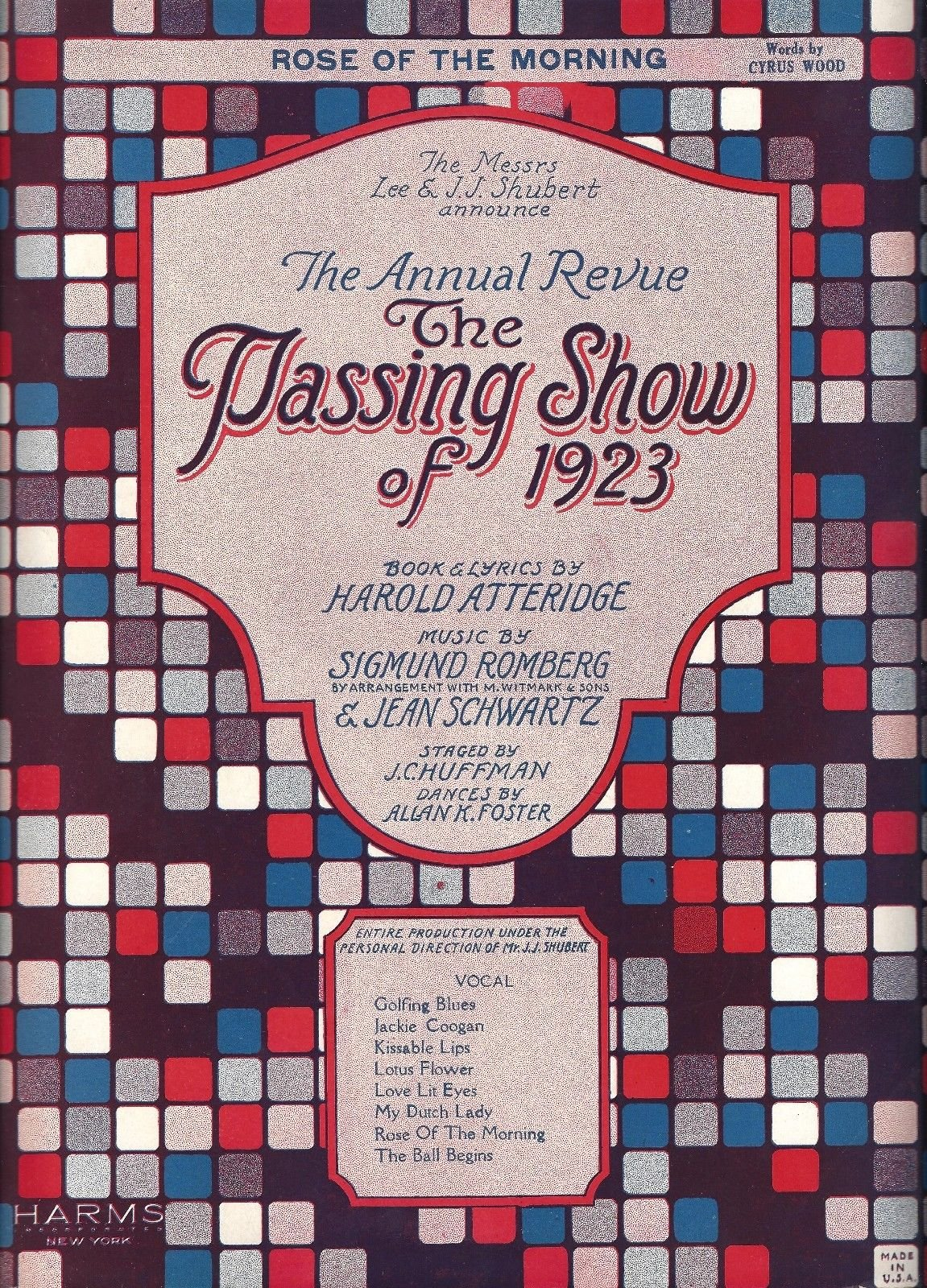
Sheet music for The Passing Show of 1923

In 1909, Schwartz began to work on musical theatre projects without Jerome, beginning with the Harry B. Smith musical The Silver Star, for which he was one of several credited primary composers. He formed a partnership with the lyricist Harold Atteridge, with their first major work together being the 1913 musical The Honeymoon Express. The two men then went on to work for the Shubert family in The Passing Show musical revue series, joining the composer Sigmund Romberg to create The Passing Show of 1913. The same creative trio was later re-united to create The Passing Show of 1918, The Passing Show of 1919, The Passing Show of 1923, The Passing Show of 1924, and the musicals Monte Cristo, Jr. (1919) and Innocent Eyes (1924).

Schwartz joined playwright Anne Caldwell to create the 1914 Broadway musical When Claudia Smiles. He was the composer for Shubert Gaieties of 1919 with Atteridge being one of several contributing writers to the show's book and Alfred Bryan as lyricist. He collaborated with Bryan on another musical that year, Hello, Alexander (1919), which was a major re-working of The Ham Tree. This heavily revised work supplanted most of the earlier work by Jerome with new lyrics by Bryan and a new book by Edgar Smith. The Schwartz and Bryan team followed this with The Midnight Rounders of 1920 and The Century Revue (1920). Atteridge joined the creative team of Schwartz and Bryan for The Midnight Rounders of 1921, and both Atteridge and Schwartz were part of a larger number of creatives behind The Mimic World (1921).

Schwartz and Atteridge collaborated with Eddie Cantor to create the 1922 musical Make It Snappy. The pair joined composer Al Goodman and playwright Harry Wagstaff Gribble to create Topics of 1923. Schwartz and Atteridge re-united with Bryan for the musical A Night in Spain (1927). Schwartz's final Broadway musical, Sunny Days (1928), was made with writers Clifford Grey and William Carey Duncan.

== Later life in California ==
In 1930, Schwartz ended his lengthy association with Tin Pan Alley and Broadway; publishing his last song written in New York, the aptly named "Au Revoir Pleasant Dreams", as an intentional finale to his career as a New York City songwriter and composer. This song was written with lyricist Jack Meskill and was recorded by Ben Bernie and his orchestra. Bernie used the song as his theme song for his radio program.

Schwartz then moved to Los Angeles, California where he mostly retired from songwriting. He wrote one last hit song, "Trust in Me", in collaboration with Ned Wever and Milton Ager. This song was first popularized in separate recordings made in 1937 by Mildred Bailey and Wayne King. It has been recorded by numerous artists, including Beyoncé in the 2008 film Cadillac Records.

== Personal life and death ==
Schwartz married the actress, singer, and dancer Jenny Dolly of the Dolly Sisters in 1913. They divorced in 1921. Jean Schwartz died in Sherman Oaks, California on November 30, 1956, at the age of 78. He was survived by his second wife Sally Schwartz. He was posthumously inducted into the Songwriters Hall of Fame in 1970.

== Musicals ==
=== As main composer ===
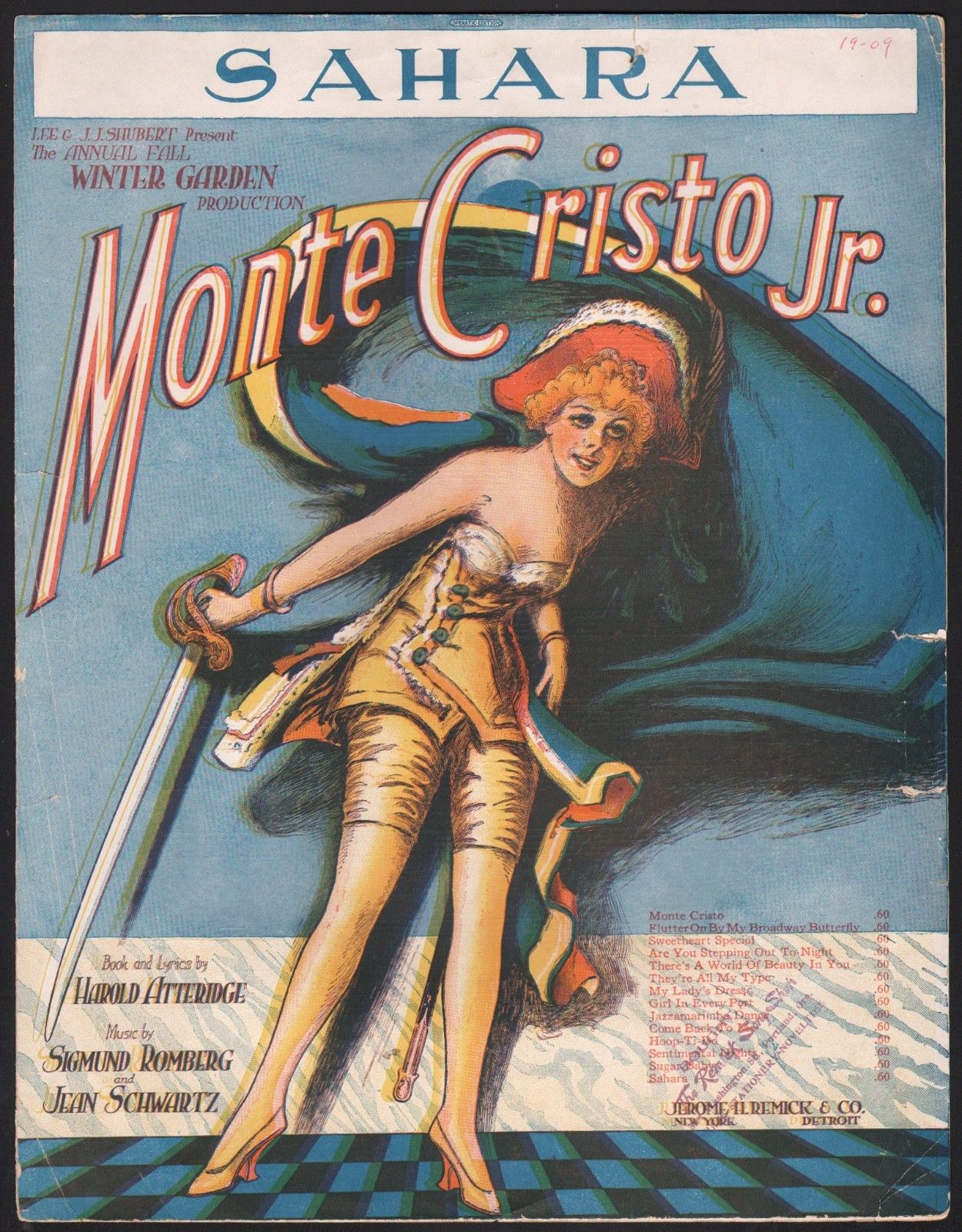
Sheet music cover for Monte Cristo, Jr. (1919)

- Mrs. Delaney of Newport (1903)
- Piff! Paff!! Pouf!!! (1904)
- A Yankee Circus on Mars (1905)
- Lifting the Lid (1905)
- The Ham Tree (1905)
- Fritz in Tammany Hall (1905)
- Lola from Berlin (1907)
- In Hayti (1909)
- The Silver Star (1909)
- Up and Down Broadway (1910)
- The Honeymoon Express (1913)
- The Passing Show of 1913
- When Claudia Smiles (1914)
- The Passing Show of 1918
- The Passing Show of 1919
- Shubert Gaieties of 1919
- Monte Cristo, Jr. (1919)
- Hello, Alexander (1919; heavily revised version of The Ham Tree)
- The Midnight Rounders of 1920
- The Century Revue (1920)
- The Mimic World (1921)
- The Midnight Rounders of 1921
- The Passing Show of 1921
- Make It Snappy (1922)
- Topics of 1923
- The Passing Show of 1923
- Innocent Eyes (1924)
- The Passing Show of 1924
- Annie Dear (1924)
- A Night in Spain (1927)
- Sunny Days (1928)

=== As contributing composer, lyricist, or songwriter ===
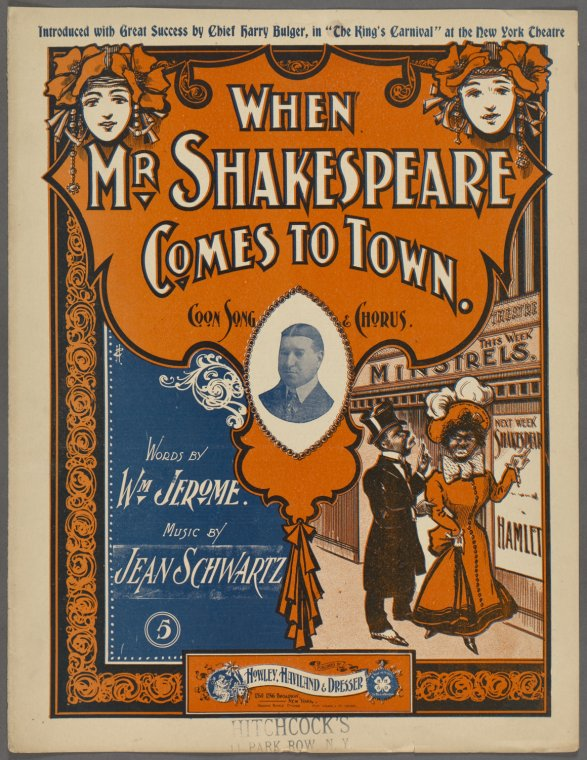
Front cover of the 1901 sheet music for Schwartz & Jerome's "When Mr. Shakespeare Comes To Town" which was introduced by Harry Bulger in The King's Carnival.

- The King's Carnival (1901); contributed some songs
- The Strollers (1901); contributed some music
- DuHurry (1901); contributed some songs
- The Sleeping Beauty and the Beast (1901); contributed some songs
- The Wild Rose (1902); contributed some music
- A Chinese Honeymoon (1902); contributed some music
- My Lady Peggy Goes to Town (1903)
- Mr. Bluebeard (1903); contributed some musical numbers
- The Jersey Lily (1903); contributed some music
- Mother Goose (1903); contributed some lyrics
- An English Daisy (1904); contributed some music
- Glittering Gloria (1904); contributed some songs
- Sergeant Brue (1905); contributed some songs
- The White Cat (1905); contributed some music and lyrics
- The Little Cherub (1906); contributed some music
- The Rich Mr. Hoggenheimer (1907); interpolated some songs
- Ziegfeld Follies of 1907 (1907); contributed some songs
- The Hired Girl's Millions (1907); contributed some music
- A Yankee Tourist (1907); contributed some music
- The Gay White Way (1908); contributed the song "My Irish Gibson Girl"
- Ziegfeld Follies of 1908; contributed the song "When the Girl You Love is Loving You"
- The American Idea (1908); contributed the song "They Always Follow Me"
- Miss Innocence (1908); contributed the song "I'm Crazy When the Band Begins to Play"
- A Broken Idol (1909): contributed some music
- The Echo (1910); contributed some songs
- Vera Violetta (1911); contributed some music
- A Winsome Widow (1912); contributed some music numbers
- The Wall Street Girl (1912); contributed some music
- Over the River (1912); contributed some music
- Hokey-pokey (1912); contributed songs
- The Sun Dodgers (1912); contributed songs
- Hands Up (1915); contributed some music
- Hip! Hip! Hooray!; contributed some music
- Pom-pom (1916); contributed songs
- Betty (1916); contributed songs
- Words and Music (1917); contributed songs
- Sinbad (1918); contributed some music
- Oh, My Dear! (1918); contributed some music
- The Rose of Stamboul (1922); contributed songs for the Broadway production
- Dew Drop Inn (1923); contributed songs
- Ziegfeld Follies of 1923; contributed some music

== Partial list of songs ==
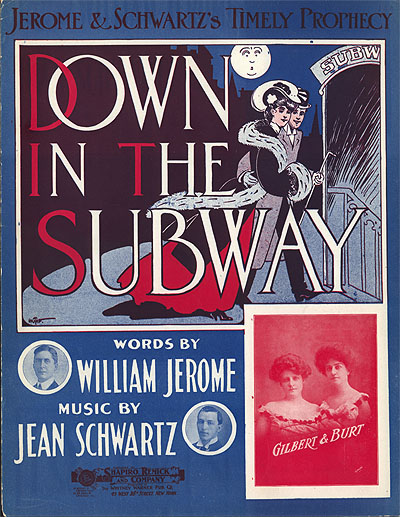
Sheet music cover for a Jerome & Schwartz 1904 tune

- 1901 "I'm Tired" " (w. William Jerome), a popular hit for Eddie Foy; introduced in The Strollers
- 1901 "Any Old Place I Hang My Hat Is Home Sweet Home" " (w. William Jerome)
- 1911 "April Fool Rag"
- 1911 "Rum Tum Tiddle"
- 1912 "That Chop Stick Rag"
- 1914 "I Love You Just Like Lincoln Loved the Old Red, White and Blue" (w. William Jerome & Joe Young)
- 1915 "Goodbye Virginia" (w. Grant Clarke)
- 1915 "Hello, Hawaii, How Are You?" (with Bert Kalmar and Edgar Leslie).
- 1915 "Shooting the Bull Around the Bulletin Board" (w. William Jerome)
- 1916 "Are You Prepared for the Summer?" (w. Bert Kalmar & Edgar Leslie)
- 1916 "I'm Going Back Home and Have a Wonderful Time" (w. William Jerome)
- 1917 "America Needs You Like a Mother. Would You Turn Your Mother Down?" (w. Grant Clark)
- 1918 "Boots Boots Boots" (w. Blanche Merrill)
- 1918 "Hello Central! Give Me No Man's Land" (w. Sam M. Lewis & Joe Young)
- 1918 "I'm On a Long Long Ramble - Over There I'll Be Rambling with You" (w. Sam Lewis & Joe Young)
- 1918 "Tell That to the Marines" with Al Jolson (w. Harold Atteridge)
- 1918 "I'm Over Here and You're Over There" (w. Harold Atteridge)
- 1918 "On the Level You're a Little Devil" (w. Joe Young)
- 1918 "Rock-a-Bye Your Baby with a Dixie Melody" (w. Sam M. Lewis & Joe Young)
- 1918 "Twit, Twit, Twit" (w. Blanche Merrill)
- 1918 "Wedding Bells, Will You Ever Ring for Me?" (w. Sam M. Lewis & Joe Young)
- 1919 "I'm Going to Break That Mason-Dixon Line Until I Get to That Gal of Mine" (w. Alfred Bryan)
- 1930 "Au Revoir, Pleasant Dreams" (was adopted by Ben Bernie as his broadcasting theme song)

== Selected works ==
- Schwartz, Jean, and William Jerome. Bedelia: The Irish Coon Song Serenade. New York: Shapiro, Remick & Co, 1903. OCLC 10156242
- Schwartz, Jean, and William Jerome. Chinatown, My Chinatown. New York: Jerome H. Remick & Co, 1910. OCLC 44553598
- Schwartz, Jean, Sam M. Lewis, and Joe Young. Hello Central! Give Me No Man's Land. New York: Waterson-Berlin & Snyder Co., 1918. OCLC 70180234
- Schwartz, Jean, Sam M. Lewis, Joe Young, and Sigmund Romberg. Rock-a-Bye Your Baby with a Dixie Melody. New York: Waterson, Berlin & Snyder, 1918. OCLC 16510835
