= Mrs. Delaney of Newport =

1903 musical

Mrs. Delaney of Newport is a musical in three acts with music by Jean Schwartz and both book and lyrics by William Jerome. Written as a starring vehicle for the comedian Kate Elinore and her sister May Elinore, it was the first of several musicals created by the songwriting team of Schwartz and Jerome. The musical premiered on September 15, 1903, at the Collingwood Opera House in Poughkeepsie, New York. The production was produced by the firm of Hyde and Benham.

A road musical, Mrs. Delaney of Newport toured nationally for 18 months; closing after performances given in Alton, Illinois in March 1905. The tour included two stops on Broadway; the first being at the Grand Opera House where it ran for one week of performances beginning on November 2, 1903. It was one of several musicals that featured the Schwartz and Jerome hit song "Bedalia"; a tune first introduced by singer Blanche Ring in the musical The Jersey Lily.
