= Chinatown, My Chinatown =

1910 song

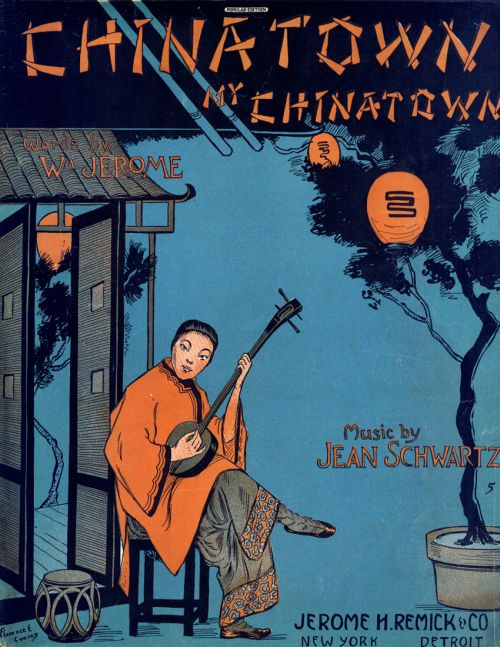
- Sheet music cover, 1910

Song
- Published: 1910
- Composer: Jean Schwartz
- Lyricist: William Jerome

Audio sample
- Recording of Chinatown, My Chinatown, performed by the American Quartet (1914).: file; help

"Chinatown, My Chinatown" is a popular song written by William Jerome (words) and Jean Schwartz (music) in 1906 and later interpolated into the musical Up and Down Broadway (1910). The song has been recorded by numerous artists and is considered an early jazz standard.

== Composition ==
Tin Pan Alley songwriters Jean Schwartz and William Jerome began their partnership in 1901, and collaborated successfully for more than a decade. They composed many popular songs together, including million-sellers "Mister Dooley" and "Bedelia". (Note: Sheet music sales were the measure at the time.) "Chinatown, My Chinatown" is considered their biggest hit, but it did not catch on when they wrote it in 1906, and the musical revue it was added to in 1910, Up and Down Broadway, was not especially successful. By the time "Chinatown, My Chinatown" became a national hit in 1915, the two were no longer collaborating.

The melody of the song uses pentatonicism, while the harmonies employ many parallel fourths and fifths, a common exoticist technique of the time based on Western stereotypes of Chinese and other East Asian musics. (Note: Historian Krystyn Moon writes: "Often, these composers chose to use parallel fourths, fifth, octaves, and minor thirds, which had been mentioned in European and American discussions of Chinese music. The most famous example was William Jerome and Jean Schwartz's "Chinatown, My Chinatown" (1910) ...") Through these musical techniques, as well as racist lyrics, the song contributes to the history of Orientalism.

The original tempo of the song was slow; later it was adapted to a fox-trot tempo, reflecting the popularity of the dance. Still later, jazz musicians played the song at a "hot jazz" tempo.

== Recording history ==
"Chinatown, My Chinatown" achieved its greatest commercial chart success during the acoustic era. Several recordings in late 1914 presaged its dominance in 1915, most notably the American Quartet with Billy Murray, whose Victor recording (matrix B-15555) reached "number one" on the national sales charts. Competing popular versions that year included releases by Grace Kerns and John Barnes Wells on Columbia, Prince’s Orchestra in a one-step medley with "Alabama Jubilee," and Sam Ash on the budget-friendly Little Wonder label.

Art Gillham recorded an early transition version in 1928. One of the first major jazz interpretations was recorded by Red Nichols and His Five Pennies (featuring Benny Goodman on clarinet) on August 29, 1929, and released by Brunswick Records; this recording was also used as the soundtrack for the Max and Dave Fleischer animated Screen Songs short subject Laundry Blues (1929). At least 25 jazz renditions of the song were recorded between 1928 and 1942, with seven recorded in 1935 alone. Fletcher Henderson's Orchestra (recorded October 3, 1930, for Columbia), Louis Armstrong, Art Tatum, Louis Prima, Ray Noble, Stéphane Grappelli and Django Reinhardt, The Mills Brothers, Tommy Dorsey's Clambake Seven, and Slim Gaillard and Slam Stewart were among the many jazz artists who recorded the song during the 1930s. Its extensive recording history is one of the core elements that qualifies it as an early jazz standard.

In subsequent decades, the song remained popular in traditional jazz and easy-listening idioms. Iconic crooner Bing Crosby recorded a relaxed vocal interpretation on August 22, 1956, at Decca Studios in Hollywood, backed by Buddy Cole & His Trio; the track was popularized through radio transcriptions and issued on Crosby's 1957 Decca studio album New Tricks. Other notable later versions were recorded by Kid Ory's Creole Jazz Band (1949), Al Jolson (1950), Chet Atkins (1952), accordionist John Serry Sr. for RCA Thesaurus at RCA Victor Studios (1954), and Chris Connor (1958).

== In popular culture ==
"Chinatown, My Chinatown" has been featured prominently in twentieth-century cinema, most notably as a recurring period motif in several films directed by Woody Allen, including Radio Days (1987) and Alice (1990). The song also appeared on the soundtrack of Radio Days, anchoring its nostalgic depiction of 1940s American broadcast culture. Earlier in its cinematic history, an instrumental jazz arrangement of the tune served as the musical accompaniment for Max and Dave Fleischer’s pioneering 1929 animated Screen Songs musical short subject Laundry Blues. The song is also featured on the soundtrack of the 2002 video game Mafia: The City of Lost Heaven where it serves as the theme track for the Chinatown neighborhood.

== See also ==
- List of pre-1920 jazz standards
