= Albert Gumble =

American songwriter

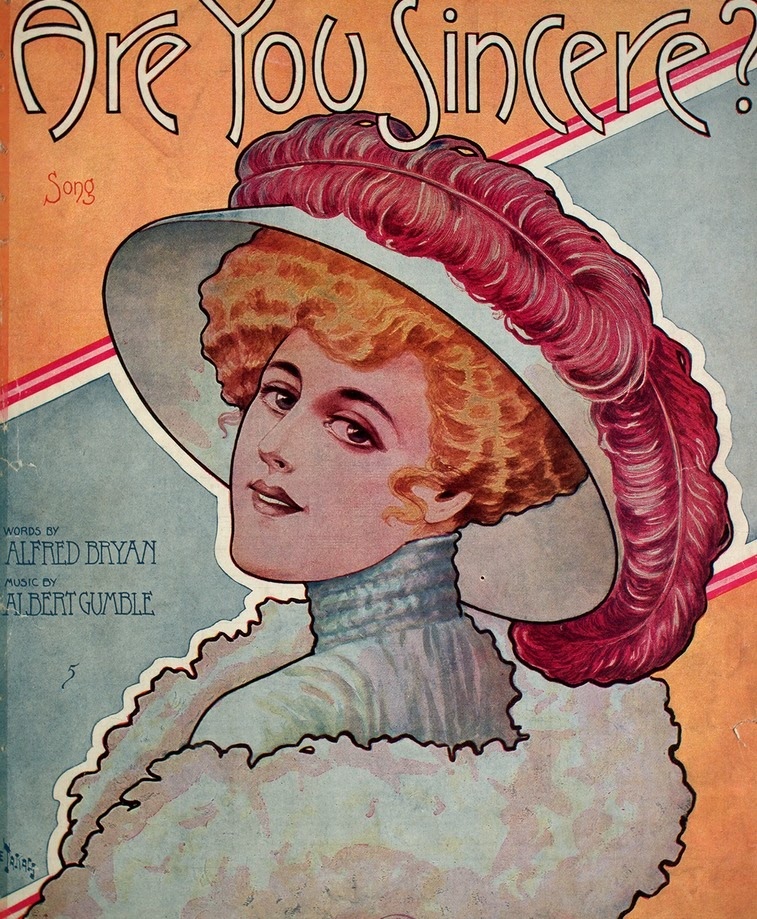
Front cover of the sheet music for Gumble's 1908 hit song "Are You Sincere?".

Albert Gumble (September 10, 1883 – November 30, 1946) was an American composer, pianist, music arranger, and songwriter. After graduating from the Auditorium School of Music in Cincinnati, he lived and worked briefly in Chicago during the early years of the twentieth century before moving to New York City where he worked as a Tin Pan Alley composer of ragtime pieces and songs. As a songwriter he was particularly associated with dixie tunes. He also was a prolific music arranger and contributed music to several Broadway musicals. From 1938 until his death in 1946 he was a resident pianist at the Ansonia Hotel.

== Life and career ==
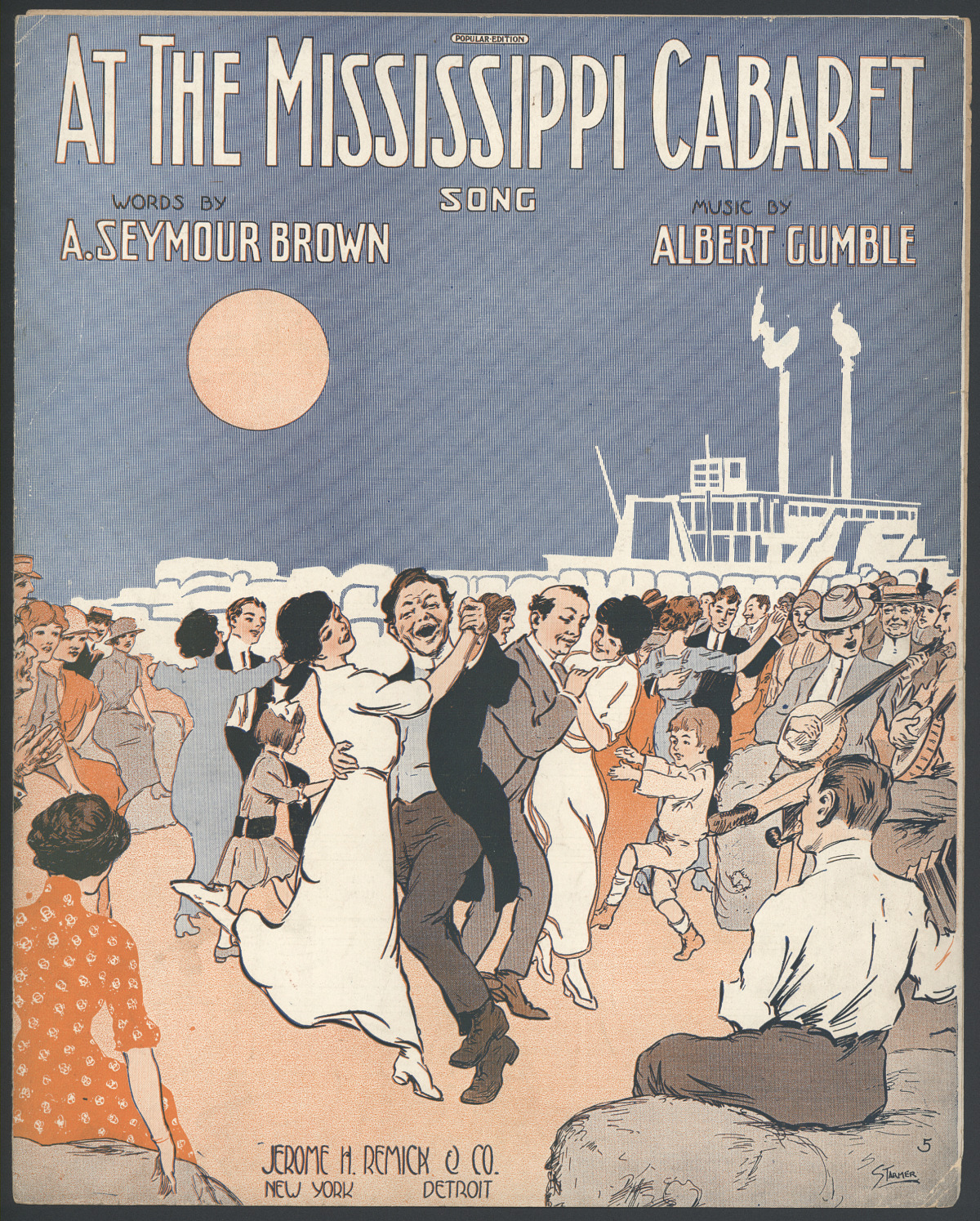
Front cover of the sheet music for "At the Mississippi Cabaret", one of several dixie songs written by Gumble between 1909 and 1919.

Albert Gumble was born in North Vernon, Indiana, on September 10, 1883. He was the younger brother of pianist, songwriter, and publisher Moses Edwin Gumble. He was educated at the Auditorium School of Music (later known as the Ohio Conservatory of Music) in Cincinnati where he was a pupil of Clarence Adler and Herman Froehlich. After graduating, he moved to Chicago where he began composing in the early 1900s. He moved to New York City where Tin Pan Alley publisher Joseph W. Stern published his first rag, "Kentucky Beauty" (1904), a piece co-written with Monroe Rosenfeld. He composed several more rags for the music publisher Jerome H. Remick, including the "Bolo Rag" (1908), "Minstrel Band Rag" (1909), "Georgia Rag" (1910), and "Red Fox Trot" (1917).

In addition to composing rags for Tin Pan Alley, Gumble also simultaneously worked as a songwriter. Scholar John Bush Jones stated that "Between 1909 and 1919 Albert Gumble seems to have made a career out of writing the music for nineteen dixie tunes with words by ten different lyricists." Some of his dixie songs published by Jerome H. Remick included "Lady Love" (1909, lyricist William M. McKenna), "At The Mississippi Cabaret" (1914, lyricist A. Seymour Brown, recorded by the American Quartet), "Circus Day in Dixie" (1915, lyricist Jack Yellen), "Welcome Honey To Your Own Plantation Home" (1917, lyricist Yellen, recorded by Al Jolson), "So This is Dixie" (1917, lyricist Yellen), "Southern Gals" (1917, lyricist Yellen), and "There's A Lump of Sugar Down in Dixie" (1918, lyricists Alfred Bryan and Yellen; recorded by Al Jolson). Music publisher Leo Feist published another dixie medley by Gumble and Yellen, "There's Nothing Sweeter Than A Girl From Dixieland" (1917).

Gumble also wrote other kinds of popular songs for Tin Pan Alley most of which were also published by Remick, but also some works which were self-published. The most successful of these were the songs "The Girl Who Threw Me Down" (1907, lyricist Benjamin Hapgood Burt), "Are You Sincere?" (1908, lyricist Alfred Bryan), and "Rebecca of Sunnybrook Farm" (1914, lyricist Seymour Brown). "Are You Sincere?" was a hit song for Elise Stevenson who recorded the work for the Victor Talking Machine Company in 1908. His romantic ballad "On Lake Champlain", about two lovers who are paddling by moonlight at midnight on the North American Lake, was published in the 2009 anthology New York Sings: 400 Years of the Empire State In Song.

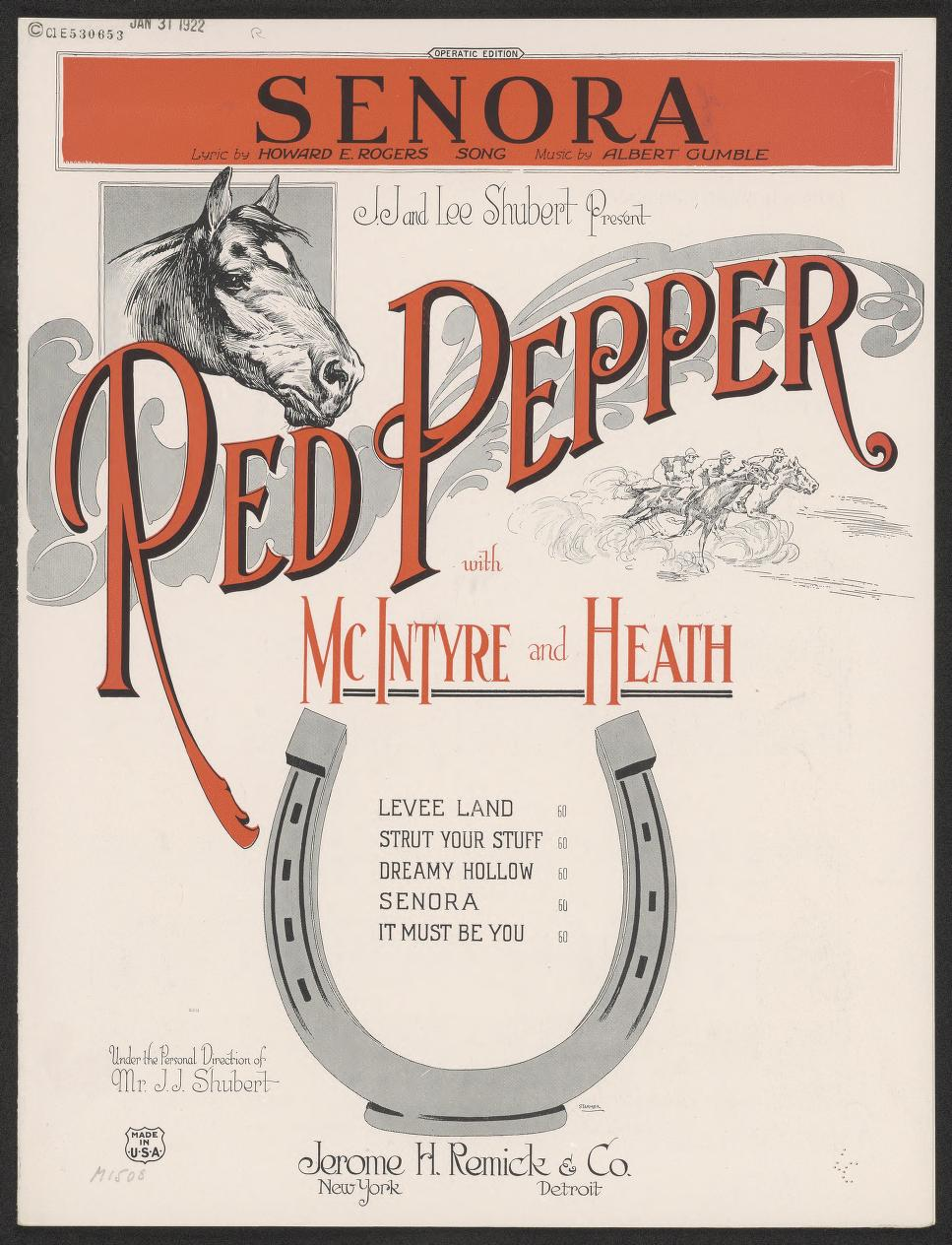
Front cover of the 1922 sheet music for the song "Senora" from the Broadway musical Red Pepper. Music by Gumble and lyrics by Howard Emmett Rogers. Published by Jerome H. Remick.

Gumble also wrote music for Broadway. He contributed some instrumental music to Harold Atteridge and Sigmund Romberg's 1918 musical Sinbad at the Winter Garden Theatre, and his song "Peachie" (lyricist Yellen) was written for Act 2 of the musical revue Frivolities of 1920 at the 44th Street Theatre. His greatest contribution to musical theatre was co-writing the score to Red Pepper with Owen Murphy. Red Pepper used lyrics by Howard Emmett Rogers and was staged at the Shubert Theatre in 1922. Gumble and Murphy's score was rooted in jazz at a time when musical fashion on Broadway was just beginning to shift in that direction. Their forward thinking score shocked the reviewer in the New York Post who criticized their music for its embrace of that music genre.

Gumble continued to publish music with Remick through 1928 after which he worked as a staff composer and arranger for Donaldson, Douglas, and Gumble which was co-founded by his brother and songwriters Walter Donaldson and Walter Douglas. In the 1930s his career slowly shifted away from composing and arranging into piano playing. In 1938 he took a position as resident pianist at the Ansonia Hotel in Manhattan where he remained until his death eight years later.

== Personal life and death ==
Albert Gumble died on November 30, 1946, in New York City. He and his wife, Florence Loraine Simmons, whom he married in 1915, had one son together, Albert Gumble Jr.
