= The Silver Star (musical) =

1909 musical

The Silver Star is a musical in three acts with both book and lyrics by Harry B. Smith and music by many composers. A Christmas musical, the work was created for the Danish dancer Adeline Genée who portrays the central character of Viola.

== Plot ==
As a young child, Viola was found abandoned and wearing a silver star by a hobo-musician, Professor Alfonzo Dinel, who has raised her as his adopted daughter. One Christmas Eve, Viola and the professor deceive a wealthy family with a mansion on Fifth Avenue that Viola is the long-lost daughter of a wealthy banker in order to win an invitation to their lavish Christmas party. They attend the party, but their deception is discovered. In the attempt to get away, Viola is magically transported first to Paris, France and later to London, England. In a series of magical transformations, Genée transforms back and forth from Viola into various dancing characters, including "The Christmas Fairy", "The Spirit of Champagne", and "The Queen of the Floral Fete". In London Viola is united with her birth father.

== History ==
Playwright Harry B. Smith was hired by Broadway producers Klaw and Erlanger to create a Christmas musical tailored for the talents of Adeline Genée. Several different composers were enlisted to write the music for the show, including Robert Hood Bowers, C. J. M. Glaser, Jean Schwartz, Raymond Hubbell, Al Piantadosi and Karl Hoschna.

The Silver Star premiered at Broadway's New Amsterdam Theatre on November 1, 1909, where it ran for 80 performances; closing on January 8, 1910. Herbert Gresham directed, while Glaser and Bowers music directed. Julian Mitchell choreographed the show, F. Richard Anderson designed the costumes, and Ernest Albert designed the sets. The musical then went on a month-long national tour before returning to Broadway for a further eight performances at Broadway's Grand Opera House in February 1910. In addition to Genée, the cast included George Bickel as Professor Alonzo Dingelblatz, Harry Watson as Doctor Algernon Hornblower, and Barney Bernard as Mr. Wiseheimer.
