= Innocent Eyes (musical) =

Musical revue with music by Sigmund Romberg and Jean Schwartz

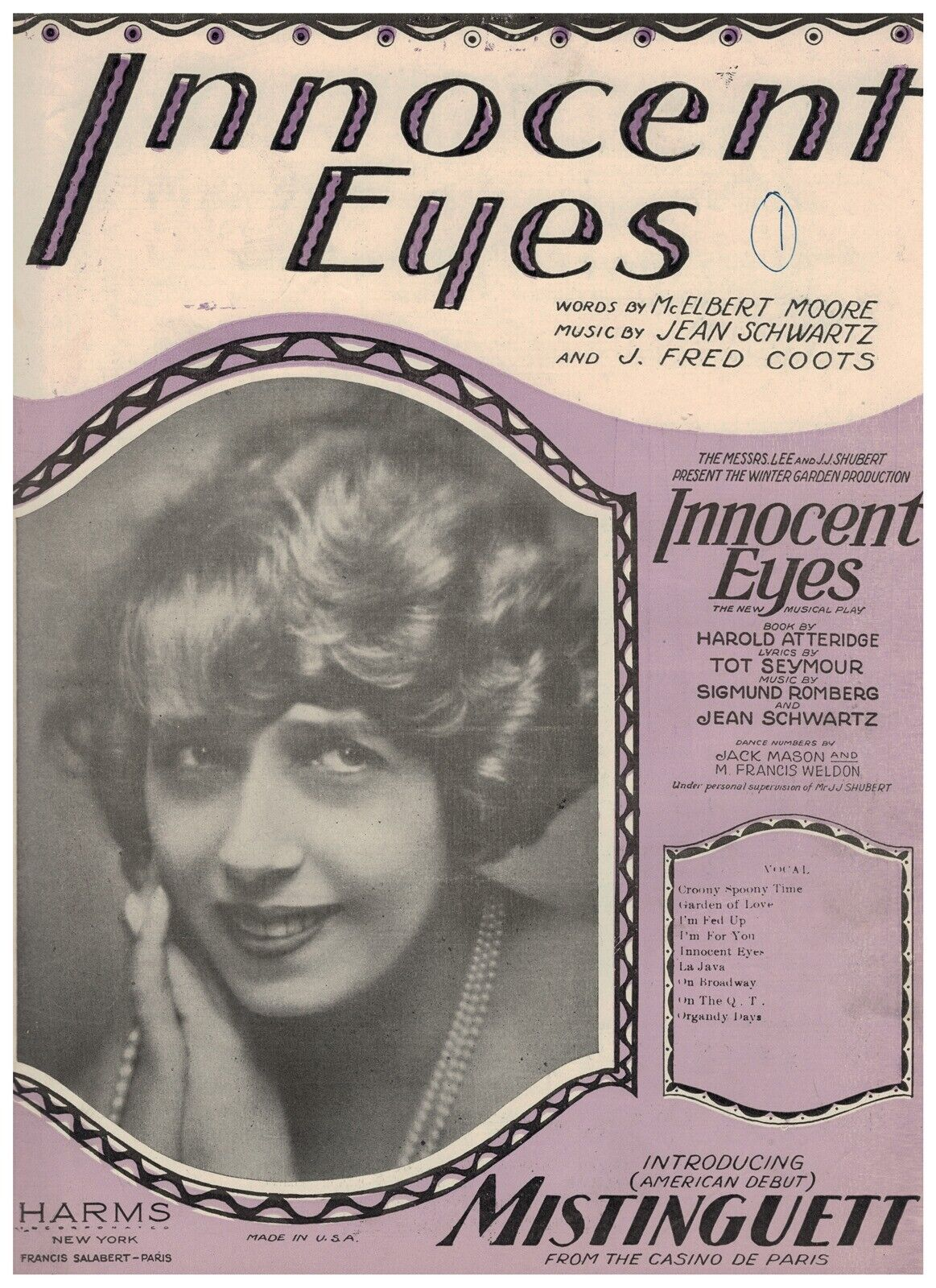
Front cover of the sheet music for Innocent Eyes published by T. B. Harms & Francis, Day & Hunter, Inc. in 1924. The actress singer and singer Mistinguett is featured on the cover.

Innocent Eyes is a musical revue in two acts with music by Sigmund Romberg and Jean Schwartz, lyrics by Harold Atteridge and Tot Seymour, and a book by Atteridge. Produced by brothers Jacob J. and Lee Shubert, the musical premiered at the Winter Garden Theatre on May 20, 1924, where it ran for 126 performances; closing on August 30, 1924. Set in Paris, France, the work had no unifying plot and was instead a series of vignettes intended to show off the various talents of the work's stars. The production's lavish sets and costumes rivaled those of the Ziegfeld Follies; the work's chief competitor in the musical revue genre that Broadway season. Charles Gesmar designed the costumes and Watson Barratt designed the sets.

Innocent Eyes was directed by Frank Smithson and choreographed by Jack Mason and Francis Weldon. The musical was created as a starring vehicle for the French actress and singer Mistinguett who had achieved fame at the Moulin Rouge and Folies Bergère. Humiliated by bad reviews in the American press which dismissed Mistinguett's talents as both a singer and actress as "seldom rising above the level of mediocrity", she left the production early after just 31 performances. Fay Marbe replaced Mistinguett and received better reviews in the show. Joan Crawford, then known as Lucile Le Sueur, made her Broadway debut in this production as one of the chorus girls.
