= The Mimic World =

The Mimic World is a musical revue in two acts and a prologue with music by Jean Schwartz, Lew Pollack, and Owen Murphy; and both book and lyrics by Harold Atteridge, Jimmy Hussey, and Murphy. Produced by the Shubert family, the revue premiered on Broadway at the Century Promenade (located on the roof of the Century Theatre ) on August 17, 1921; closing after 26 performances on September 10, 1921.
