= Lifting the Lid =

1905 musical

Lifting the Lid is a musical in four scenes with music by Jean Schwartz, lyrics by William Jerome, and a book by John J. McNally. The musical was a spoof of New York City politics of the early 20th century, and included impersonations of both political figures and other personalities of the period. The Manhattan district attorney William Travers Jerome was particularly lampooned as the musical's central character, district attorney William T. G. Rome, was a send up of Jerome and performed in an uncanny impersonation by the actor Julius Tannen.

== Performance history ==
Lifting the Lid premiered at Broadway's Aerial Gardens on June 5, 1905, in a double bill with A Gilbert and Sullivan Review. The musical was produced by Klaw and Erlanger, co-directed and choreographed by Herbert Gresham and Ned Wayburn, and used sets by the firm of Castle and Harvey. F. Richard Anderson designed the costumes and Frederic Solomon was music director of the production. The production closed on August 26, 1905, after 72 performances.
