= Lola from Berlin =

1907 musical by Jean Schwartz, William Jerome and John J. McNally

Lola from Berlin is a musical in three acts with music by Jean Schwartz, lyrics by William Jerome, and a book by John J. McNally. The musical was created as a starring vehicle for actress Lulu Glaser who portrayed the title role in the original production. The work is about the German girl Lotchen von Breckenhaussett, aka "Lola", who travels from Berlin to New York City to collect an unexpected inheritance from a distant American relation.

== History ==
Lola from Berlin premiered at Broadway's Liberty Theatre on September 16, 1907. Criticized in the New York press as unoriginal in terms of plot, it closed after 35 performances on October 19, 1907. The musical was then significantly reworked and went on a national tour in 1908-1909 without Glaser. While the work as a whole was not well reviewed, the music for the show was praised by critics.
