= Calling Bulldog Drummond =

1951 British film by Victor Saville

- UK quad poster for the film Calling Bulldog Drummond
- Directed by: Victor Saville
- Written by: Gerard Fairlie; Howard Emmett Rogers; Arthur Wimperis; Herman C. McNeile
- Produced by: Hayes Goetz
- Starring: Walter Pidgeon; Robert Beatty; Margaret Leighton; David Tomlinson
- Cinematography: Freddie Young
- Edited by: Frank Clarke
- Music by: Rudolph G. Kopp
- Production company: MGM British
- Distributed by: Loew's, Inc.
- Release date: 2 July 1951
- Running time: 80 minutes
- Country: United Kingdom
- Language: English
- Budget: $1,594,000
- Box office: $889,000

Calling Bulldog Drummond is a 1951 British crime film directed by Victor Saville and featuring Walter Pidgeon, Margaret Leighton, Robert Beatty, David Tomlinson, and Bernard Lee. It featured the character Bulldog Drummond created by novelist Herman Cyril McNeile, which had seen a number of screen adaptations. A novel tie-in was also released in 1951. It was made by the British subsidiary of MGM at Elstree Studios. The film's sets were designed by art director Alfred Junge.

== Plot ==
Drummond is called out of retirement by Scotland Yard to infiltrate a ruthless London crime outfit. After three robberies are pulled off with military precision, Inspector McIver asks Hugh "Bulldog" Drummond to give Scotland Yard a hand. As an ex-officer, Drummond knows how the suspected military mastermind would think. He agrees, though he very reluctantly accepts Sergeant Helen Smith of Special Branch as his partner, believing that women are not cut out for that sort of undercover work.

Drummond arranges to get caught cheating at poker at his London club so he can drop out of sight. Smith causes a minor car accident involving Arthur Gunns, suspected of being in the gang. Gunns' attraction to Smith and carefully planted evidence showing "Joe Crandall" and "Lily Ross" to be criminals themselves enables the pair to infiltrate the gang.

Drummond's friend Algernon Longworth, who has been kept in the dark about the whole matter, becomes convinced that all is not what it seems. He telephones Colonel Webson, a member of Drummond's club, to get him to postpone Drummond's disciplinary meeting. By so doing, he inadvertently tips off the secret leader of the gang. Drummond and Smith are taken prisoner.

Gunns' girlfriend Molly convinces him to go ahead with the latest planned robbery, enough to set them up for life, despite the police having been put on alert by Drummond. She masquerades as Smith to give phony information to Longworth to pass along to the police regarding the target of the theft. Afterward, Longworth is tied up, as well.

The gang steals £500,000 in gold being delivered by aeroplane. Drummond is able to overpower the guard and his friends before the gang returns. He knocks out Gunns (who has locked up and gassed his unsuspecting confederates nearly to death to avoid sharing the loot). Webson shows up and holds Drummond at gunpoint; he explains he got into the racket because civilian life turned out to be unbearably boring. The police arrive just in time and take him into custody.

== Cast ==
- Walter Pidgeon as Hugh "Bulldog" Drummond
- Margaret Leighton as Sergeant Helen Smith
- Robert Beatty as Arthur Gunns
- David Tomlinson as Algenon "Algy" Longworth
- Peggy Evans as Molly
- Charles Victor as Inspector McIver
- Bernard Lee as Colonel Webson
- James Hayter as Bill, a friend of Drummond's
- Patric Doonan as Alec
- Laurence Naismith as Hardcastle, Card player
- Richard Caldicot as Judge
- Richard Johnson as Control Tower Operator

== Reception ==
According to MGM records, the film earned $372,000 in the US and Canada and $517,000 elsewhere, resulting in a loss of $1,052,000.
