= Herbert Gresham =

Theatre director and actor (1852–1921)

Herbert Gresham (1852 in London – February 23, 1921) was an English-born American theatre director, choreographer, and actor.

== Life and career ==
Herbert Gresham was born in London in 1852. He began his career as an actor as a member of Augustin Daly's theatre troupe. He made his New York stage debut in 1883 as Gabriel Gadforth in The Frolics of a Day. In 1884 he scored a big success as the villain Marquis de Baccarat in Broadway's first hit musical, William Gill's Adonis. He remained in that part for several seasons.

In 1891 Gresham starred opposite Eddie Foy in Sinbad in Chicago. He then went back with Daly's company, and with that company he portrayed Little John in the United States premiere of Alfred Tennyson's The Foresters in 1892. He performed on and off with Daly's company for many years; occasionally leaving to pursue other projects. Other roles he performed with Daly's company included Dandie Dinmont in Guy Mannering, Flutter in Hannah Cowley's The Belle's Stratagem, Gratiano in The Merchant of Venice, Malvolio in Twelfth Night, Meddle in Dion Boucicault and John Brougham's London Assurance, Speed in The Two Gentlemen of Verona, Stephano in The Tempest, and Touchstone in As You Like It. Other United States premieres he performed in at Daly's Theatre, Broadway included the roles of Dick Cunningham in Sidney Jones's musical The Geisha, and Sir John Garnett in Cecil Raleigh and Henry Hamilton's The Great Ruby (1899).

In 1898 Gresham choreographed his first Broadway musical, the United States premiere of A Runaway Girl in which he also portrayed Professor Tamarind. In 1900 he directed his first Broadway play Joseph Arthur's Lost River at Haverly's 14th Street Theatre. He went on to form a prolific partnership with Broadway producers Klaw and Erlanger for whom he directed numerous Broadway plays and musicals over an eighteen-year period; sometimes also working as a choreographer. With Florenz Ziegfeld Jr. he notably was the director of The Follies of 1907, the very first "Ziegfeld Follies".

Gresham died in Mount Vernon, New York on February 23, 1921. He was married to the stage actress Martha Ford with whom he had two daughters.

== Partial list of Broadway credits ==
- The Messenger Boy (1901, director)
- The Billionaire (1902, director)
- A Midsummer Night's Dream (1903, director)
- The Ham Tree (1905, director)
- Fritz in Tammany Hall (1905, director and choreographer)
- Lifting the Lid (1905, director and choreographer)
- The Follies of 1907 (1907, director)
- Ziegfeld Follies of 1908 (1908, director)
- The Silver Star (1909, director)
- The Pink Lady (1911 original and 1912 revival, director)
- Miss Springtime (1916, director)
- The Riviera Girl (1917, director)
- The Rainbow Girl (1918, director)
- La La Lucille (1919, director)
