= The Century Revue =

1920 musical revue

The Century Revue is a musical revue in two acts with music by Jean Schwartz, lyrics by Alfred Bryan, and a book by Howard Emmett Rogers. The revue was directed by J. J. Shubert and produced on Broadway by the Shubert brothers. It premiered at the Century Grove Theatre (located on the roof of the Century Theatre ) on July 12, 1920; closing after 150 performances on January 1, 1921.
