= Cordelia Malone =

Song
- Written: 1904

"Cordelia Malone" is a novelty song written in 1904 by Billy Jerome and Jean Schwartz, and recorded that same year by popular Irish American singer Billy Murray.

The lyrics are a stableboy's first-hand account of his courtship of Cordelia Malone, a "smart Irish girl". Over the course of the song, he describes his seemingly successful efforts to woo Cordelia through use of the then newly invented telephone, stating that:

"...Young suitors can all nightly flock 'round the door, since her sister Bedelia won fame, but her smiles don't you see, they are only for me, so they might as well leave her alone, 'cause she seems to rejoice at the sound of my voice when I sing through the Bell telephone: "Hello, hello, sweet Cordelia"..."

The name given to Cordelia's sister, 'Bedelia', may be in reference to a popular 1903 song, "Bedelia (I Want to Steal Ye, Bedelia, I Love You So)", also written by Billy Jerome and Jean Schwartz.
