= John J. McNally =

American playwright (1854–1931)

John J. McNally (c. 1854 – March 25, 1931) was an American playwright, journalist, and drama critic. As a playwright he is best known for penning the books for many Broadway musicals staged between the years 1895–1909. Many of these were crafted for the Rogers Brothers, or were created in collaboration with the songwriting team of Jean Schwartz and William Jerome. He was a longtime drama critic and editor for various Boston newspapers.

== Life and career ==
Born in Charlestown, Boston, McNally was a graduate of Harvard Law School. He went into journalism; working first for The Boston Times as a reporter and then a drama editor. He then worked as both a writer and editor for The Boston Star before becoming a longtime drama critic for The Boston Herald.

McNally's first play, Revels (1880), was written as a starring vehicle for the Rogers Brothers. He went on to write numerous more plays for them; such as Rogers Brothers in London, Rogers Brothers in Paris, Rogers Brother in Wall Street, and Rogers Brothers in Tammany Hall. His musical play The Widow Jones (1895) was created as a starring vehicle for the actress and singer May Irwin. It premiered at the Boston Museum theatre before moving to Broadway. Irwin next starred in his three act play Courted into Court (1896) at Broadway's Bijou Theatre.

McNally collaborated with the song writing team of Jean Schwartz and William Jerome on several Broadway musicals; notably writing the books for Lifting the Lid, Fritz in Tammany Hall, Lola from Berlin, and In Hayti. He also wrote the book for the 1903 musical Mother Goose which was adapted from the pantomime of the same name by Arthur Collins and J. Hickory Wood.

McNally also adapted several works that were created at the Theatre Royal, Drury Lane for the American stage.

McNally died on March 25, 1931, in Brooklyn, New York.
