= Up and Down Broadway =

1910 musical revue

Up and Down Broadway is a musical revue in two acts with music by Jean Schwartz, lyrics by William Jerome, and a book Edgar Smith. The musical's loose plot concerns the god Apollo who arrives in New York City in the accompany of other Greek deities vowing to improve the theatrical tastes of the American public. In the end they decide Broadway knows more about great entertainment than the Greek gods do. The musical was written as a starring vehicle for Eddie Foy who portrayed the main servant of Apollo, Momus, and provided much of the work's comedic thrust.

Up and Down Broadway premiered at the Casino Theatre on July 18, 1910, where it ran for a total of 72 performances; closing on September 17, 1910. The show is most famous for introducing the popular standard "Chinatown, My Chinatown and the tune "Oh, that Beautiful Rag" by Irving Berlin and Ted Snyder, which experienced a succinct period of popularity on phonograph cylinder covers.
