= In Hayti =

1909 musical

In Hayti is a musical in three acts with music by Jean Schwartz, lyrics by William Jerome, and a book by John J. McNally. It premiered at Broadway's Circle Theatre on August 30, 1909. It closed after 56 performances on October 16, 1909. Produced by Klaw and Erlanger, the show was directed by A. H. Holbrook and choreographed by Julian Alfred. The work was created as a starring vehicle for vaudeville and minstrel show stars James McIntyre and Thomas Heath who were known for their work as blackface performers. It was the second musical created by the songwriting team of Schwartz and Jerome for McIntyre and Heatth; the first being the tremendously popular 1905 musical The Ham Tree.The plot of the show revolves around Colonel Scott's attempt to control the chicken market in Haiti in the midst of a revolution.
