= The Nuisance (1933 film) =

1933 film by Jack Conway

- Directed by: Jack Conway
- Written by: Bella Spewack; Sam Spewack; (adaptation and dialogue)
- Story by: Chandler Sprague; Howard Emmett Rogers
- Produced by: Lawrence Weingarten (assoc. producer)
- Starring: Lee Tracy; Madge Evans; Frank Morgan
- Cinematography: Gregg Toland
- Edited by: Frank Sullivan
- Production company: Metro-Goldwyn-Mayer
- Distributed by: Metro-Goldwyn-Mayer
- Release date: June 2, 1933
- Running time: 83 minutes
- Country: United States
- Language: English

The Nuisance is a 1933 American pre-Code film starring Lee Tracy as a lawyer, Madge Evans as his love interest (with a secret), and Frank Morgan as his accomplice.

== Cast ==
- Lee Tracy as Joseph Phineas "Joe" Stevens
- Madge Evans as Dorothy Mason
- Frank Morgan as Dr. Buchanan Prescott
- Charles Butterworth as "Floppy" Phil Montague
- John Miljan as John Calhoun
- Virginia Cherrill as Miss Rutherford
- David Landau as Kelley
- Greta Meyer as Mrs. Mannheimer
- Herman Bing as Willy
- Samuel Hinds as Mr. Beaumont
- Syd Saylor as Fred
