= When Claudia Smiles =

When Claudia Smiles is a musical in three acts with music by Jean Schwartz and both book and lyrics by Anne Caldwell. Set in New York City, the work is based on Leo Ditrichstein's 1903 play Vivian's Papas. The musical began its Broadway run at the 39th Street Theatre on February 2, 1914, and then transferred to the Lyric Theatre where it ultimately closed on March 21, 1914, after 56 performances. The production was directed by Charles Winninger and produced by Frederic McKay. The cast included Blanche Ring, Mahlon Hamilton, Anna Laughlin, and Bertha Mann.
