= Tell That to the Marines =

"Tell that to the Marines"
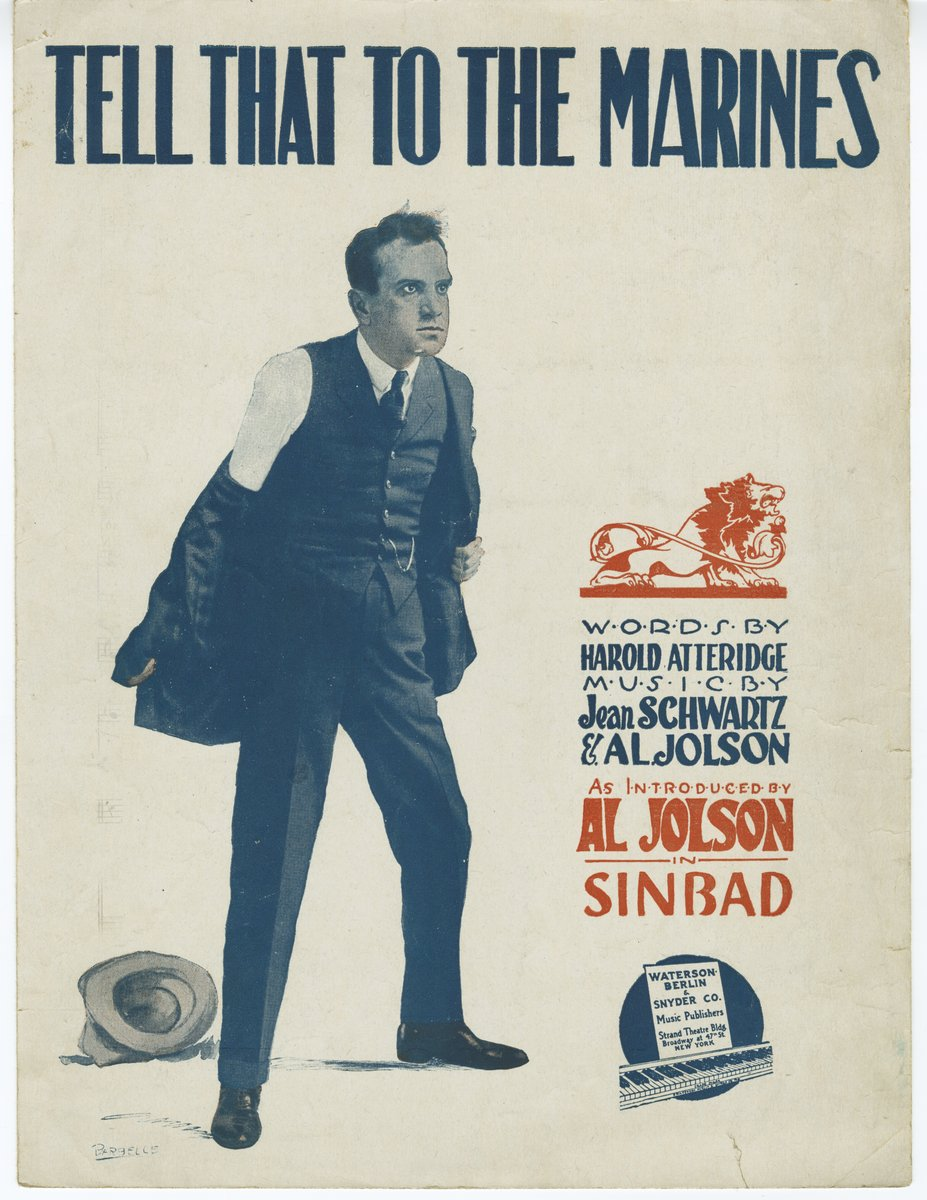

Song
- Published: 1918
- Lyricist(s): Harold Atteridge

"Tell that to the Marines" is a 1918 novelty song, written during World War I. Jean Schwartz and Al Jolson composed the music; Harold Atteridge wrote the lyrics. Al Jolson performed an early version of the song. Based on sales estimates, it reached number two on the Top 100 US songs of its time.

The lyrics reference the catchphrase, Tell It to the Marines, and they address Kaiser Wilhelm directly.

== Lyrics ==
Do you remember, Kaiser Bill About a year ago? We told your old friend Bernstorff That he better pack and go You laughed and said "America possessed no fighting stuff," Until our fighting Yankee boys Walked in and called your bluff

That Monte Cristo idea will not do If you think that the world belongs to you

Well, tell that to the Marines-- Those deviling hounds who know what fighting means You are going to lick the world-- you said you will-- If you mean Uncle Sam, now listen Kaiser Bill:

Tell that to the Marines The first to fight on all the fighting scenes If you think you'll sink our new boat With your damned old u-boat Tell that to the Marines

That line of Hindenburg's would never break, you made a vow It must be made of rubber, Bill The way it's bending now The Krupp works that you bragged about You rave of them no more We'll change them to the bankrupt works when we end up this war So Kaiser Bill at warfare we are new If you think now the Yankee drive is through

Well, tell that to the Marines Those deviling hounds who know what fighting means We are going to have six million men in line Kaiser Bill, if you don't think they will cross the Rhine

Tell that to the Marines The first to fight on all the fighting scenes If you think the Yanks won't whirl-in Right straight into Berlin Tell that to the Marines!
