= James McIntyre (theatrical actor) =

American entertainer (1857–1937)

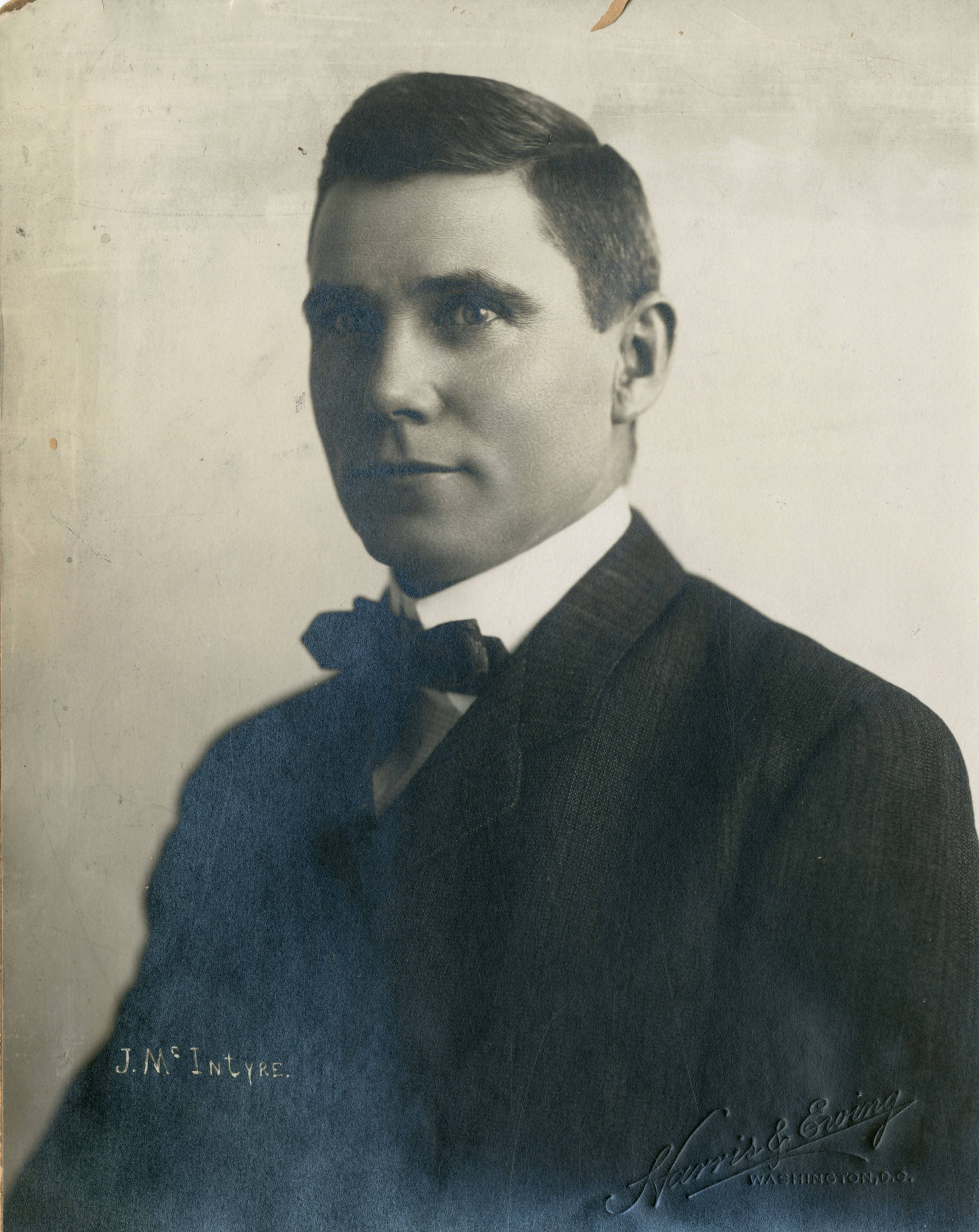
- Born: August 8, 1857; Kenosha, Wisconsin
- Died: August 18, 1937 (aged 80); Noyack, New York
- Known for: Vaudeville
- Spouse: Emma Young (1862–1935)
- Children: Maud Ainsworth Young (1892–1966), adopted

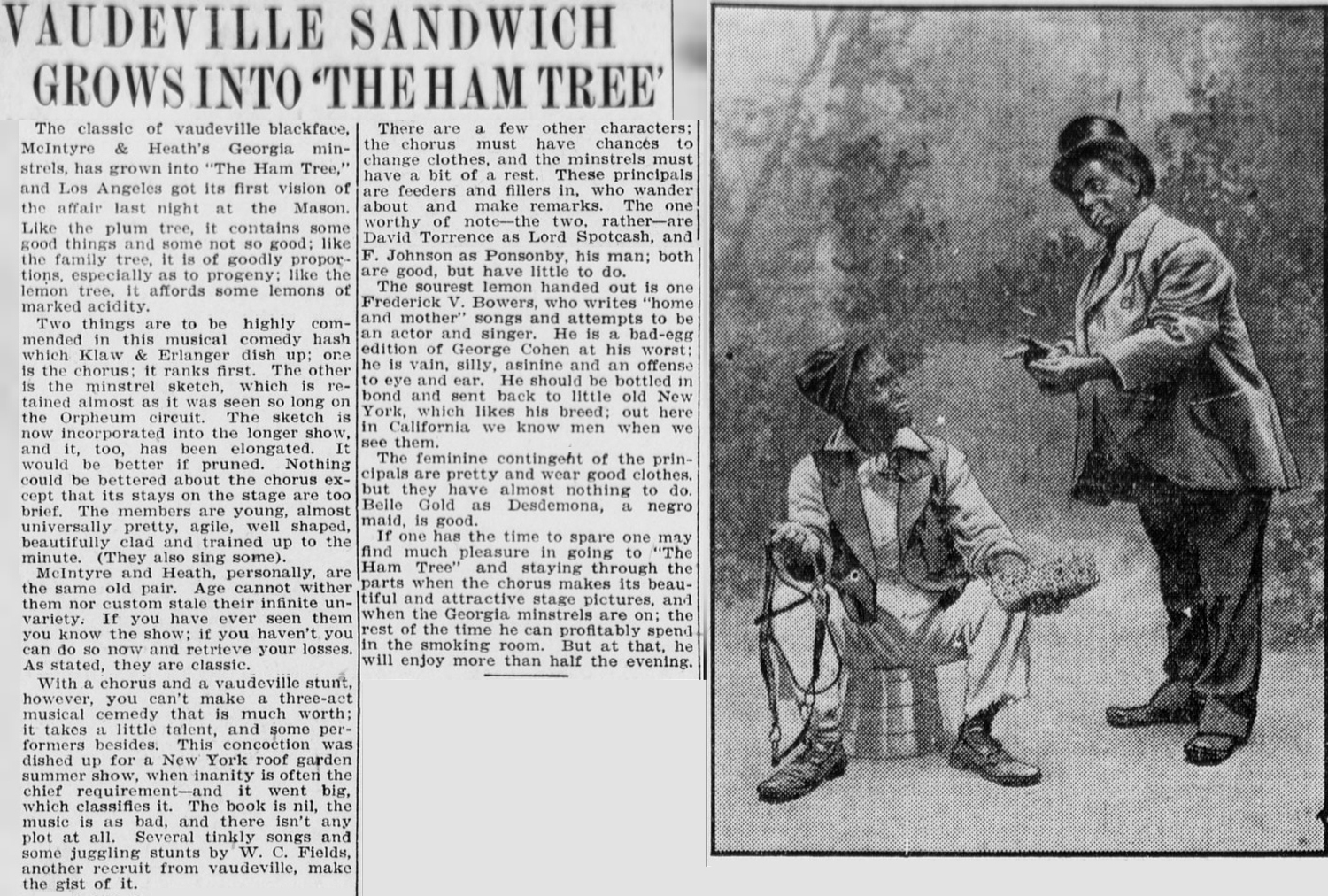
Los Angeles Herald, January 1907

James McIntyre (8 August 1857 – 18 August 1937) was an American minstrel performer, vaudeville and theatrical actor, and a partner in the famous blackface tramp comedy duo act McIntyre and Heath.

== Family and early career ==
McIntyre was born in Kenosha, Wisconsin and began working at a young age to support his widowed mother. He showed an early aptitude for dancing and acting. McIntyre sold candy on trains and when "the passengers were in danger of being bored Jim would get out in the aisles and entertain them with his clever acting." He learned the dance form known as clogging, which is part of the tap dance style. In his early teens he was keen on joining the circus troupes that passed through Kenosha. His mother initially prevented him from doing so. In 1870, he joined the McKenzie circus and then in 1871 joined the Burton and Ridgeway minstrels and toured the South and Western states for a year. Later he performed with the Katie Putnam Troupe, and toured with the Great Transatlantic circus in 1873.

He married Emma Maude Young (1862–1935). She was a dancer and balladeer known by the stage names of "Maude Clifford", and "Maud Clifton" and she performed as part of the Katie Putnam Troupe. Although they had no natural born children of their own they did adopt a daughter Maud Ainsworth Young (1892–1966). She was the biological daughter of Emma's older sister Annie Young (1860–1906) and Emma's brother-in-law Joseph Charles Ainsworth. In adult life Maud Ainsworth McIntyre became the wife of the Brooklyn criminal trial lawyer and Kings County judge George Washington Martin II (1876–1948). Emma sometimes assisted her husband in negotiating theatre contracts. Emma wrote theatrical scripts using the pseudonym Emily Louise Young, and these included The Rag Time Opera of Trial Marriage (1916), and she co-wrote Red Pepper and Hello, Alexander.

In his peak years as a star performer he gave an interview with the New York Times in which he claimed to have been responsible for introducing to vaudeville the Buck and Wing style of dance that is one form of tap dance.

== Partnership with Heath ==
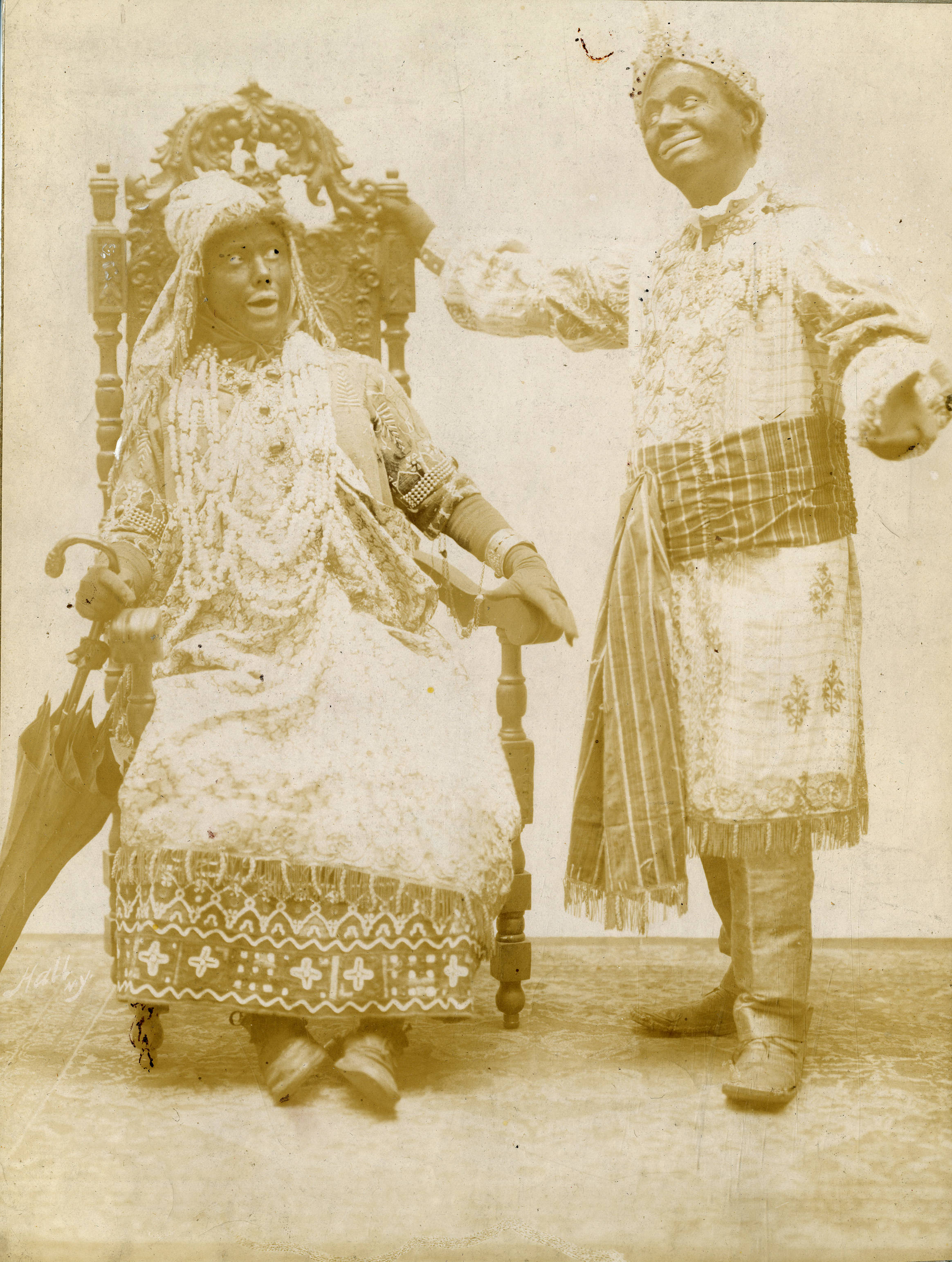
James McIntyre and Thomas Heath in a scene from "The Ham Tree"

In 1874, he met Thomas Kurton Heath (1853–1938) in Texas. They developed a blackface tramp duo minstrel act. McIntyre played the character of Alexander Hambletonian who was a buffoonish stable-boy. Heath acted as "Henry Jones" a clever black entertainer who frequently outwits Alexander. Their routines included an oft-performed skit known as the Georgia Minstrels where the character Henry persuades the witless Alexander to quit working as a stable-boy and joins a traveling show where he is promised fame and fortune. None of the fame or fortune materializes and Alexander has comical and outrageous tasks to perform under Henry's direction which allowed them to act out comedic dialogue, dance and songs. Another skit, called the Ham Tree, and which formed the nucleus of a later stage play, involved the two characters discussing how ham grows on trees that are three hundred feet tall.

Their acting partnership endured for some fifty years as they worked under the twin influential theatre managers of Tony Pastor and Benjamin Franklin Keith appearing as stars in both vaudeville and Broadway. Their blackface minstrel shows were an influential model followed by later film stars such as Al Jolson. Their best known plays included:

- The Ham Tree that was performed ninety times at the New York Theatre between August and November 1905.
  Included in the cast were Belle Gold and W. C. Fields, in his Broadway debut.
- In Hayti was performed fifty-six times at the Circle Theatre between August and October 1909.
- Hello, Alexander was performed fifty-six times at the 44th Street Theatre between October and November 1919.
- Red Pepper was performed at the Shubert Theatre in 1922.

== Death ==
McIntyre died aged eighty at his estate in Noyack, New York. He was buried in Southampton Cemetery.
