= RCA Studio =

RCA Studio or RCA Studios may refer to:

- RCA Studio A, a recording studio in Nashville, Tennessee, built in 1964
- RCA Studio B, a recording studio in Nashville, Tennessee, built in 1957
- RCA Studios New York, a recording studio in New York
- RCA Studio II, a 1970s video game console
- RCA Victor Studio (McGavock), a recording studio in Nashville rented from 1954 to 1957

== See also ==
- RCA Records
