= Piff! Paff!! Pouf!!! =

1904 musical

Piff! Paff!! Pouf!!! is a musical in two acts with music by Jean Schwartz, lyrics by William Jerome, and a book by Stanislaus Stange. It is considered the best musical created by the writing team of Schwartz and Jerome. A hit with audiences, it was the longest running musical of the 1903-1904 Broadway season. Set on the Atlantic City Boardwalk and at a mansion along the banks of the Hudson River in the Hudson River Valley in the state of New York, the musical follows a recently widowed man whose deceased wife, an heiress, left him her fortune in her will on the condition that he marry off all four of their daughters in the order of their birth prior to receiving any of her money.

== Performance history ==
Piff! Paff!! Pouf!!! premiered at Broadway's Casino Theatre on April 2, 1904, where it ran for 264 performances; closing on November 19, 1904. The popular "Radium Dance" from this show was inspired by scientist Marie Curie, and the musical was a big hit for its stars, Eddie Foy and Alice Fischer.
