= The Jersey Lily =

1903 musical

The Jersey Lily is a musical in two acts and four scenes with music by Reginald De Koven and both book and lyrics by George V. Hobart. Additionally, composer Jean Schwartz and lyricist William Jerome contributed the song "Bedelia" to the show; and it is this song that became the popular hit of the production. The sheet music for "Bedelia" sold more than three million copies. The work was created as a starring vehicle for Blanche Ring who portrayed the title role of Liliandra. The Jersey Lily premiered on Broadway at the Victoria Theatre on September 14, 1903. The cast also included Maud Raymond as Rosie Bauer.

== Plot ==
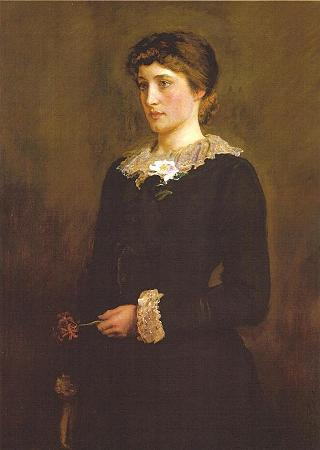
A Jersey Lily by John Everett Millais, 1878

Liliandra is a famous English operatic soprano known as "The Jersey Lily" who returns to the city of her birth, St. Helier, Jersey. There her stubborn uncle attempts to coerce her into marrying the local veterinary surgeon, Doctor Bolivar. Another local girl, Sara, is also being pressured to marry Doctor Bolivar by her father. Sara, however, wants marry her secret boyfriend, the American lieutenant Edgar Jefferson. Meanwhile, Liliandra meets the wealthy South American diplomat Don Pedro de la Platza and her heart is drawn to him over Doctor Bolivar. Liliandra and Don Pedro marry. The musical also featured humorous secondary roles in the parts of the composer Offenbach Veriverdi (taken by combining the names of composers Jacques Offenbach and Giuseppe Verdi) and the German hotel employee Rosie Bauer.
