= The Ham Tree =

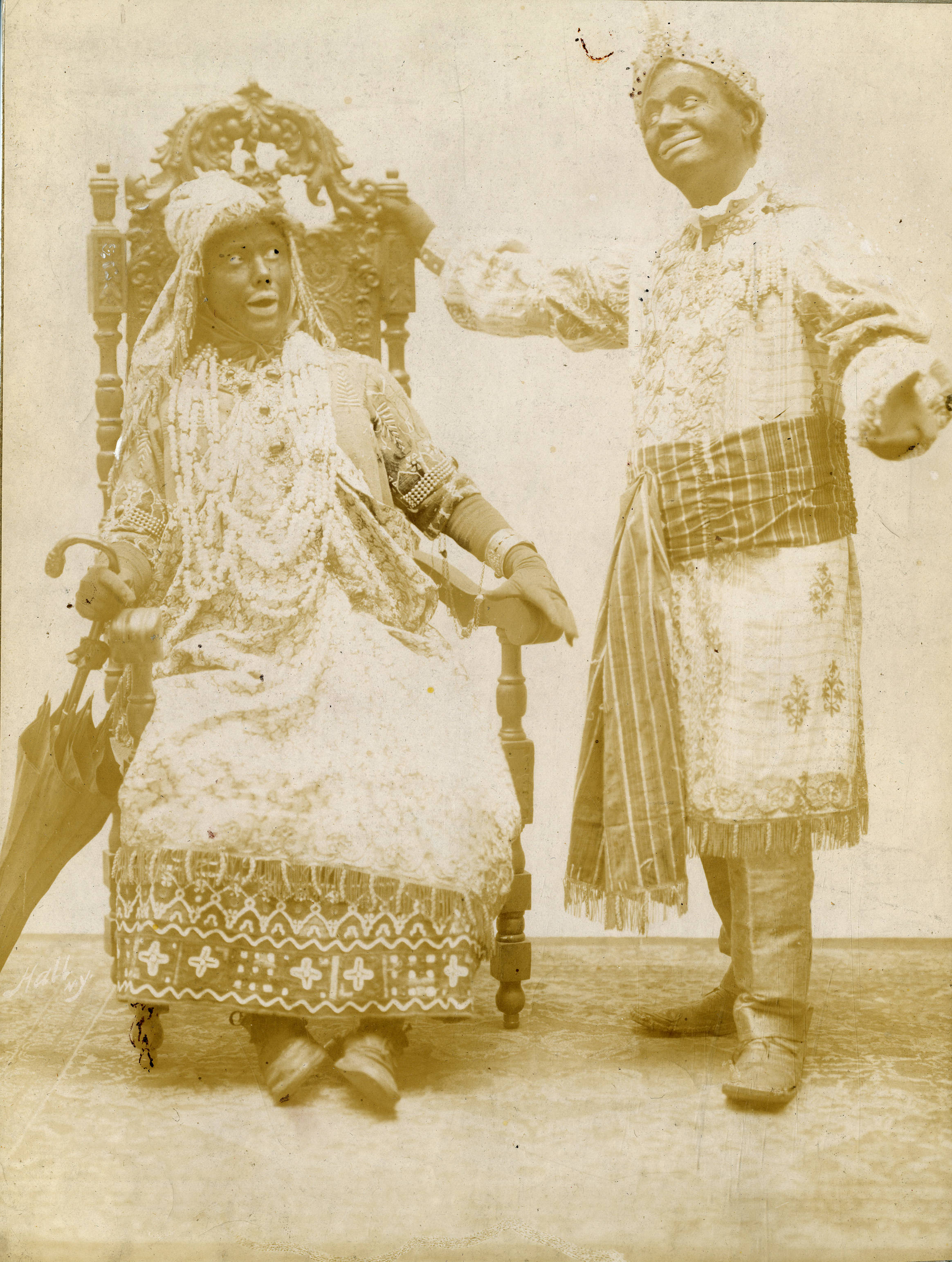
James McIntyre and Thomas Heath performing in The Ham Tree

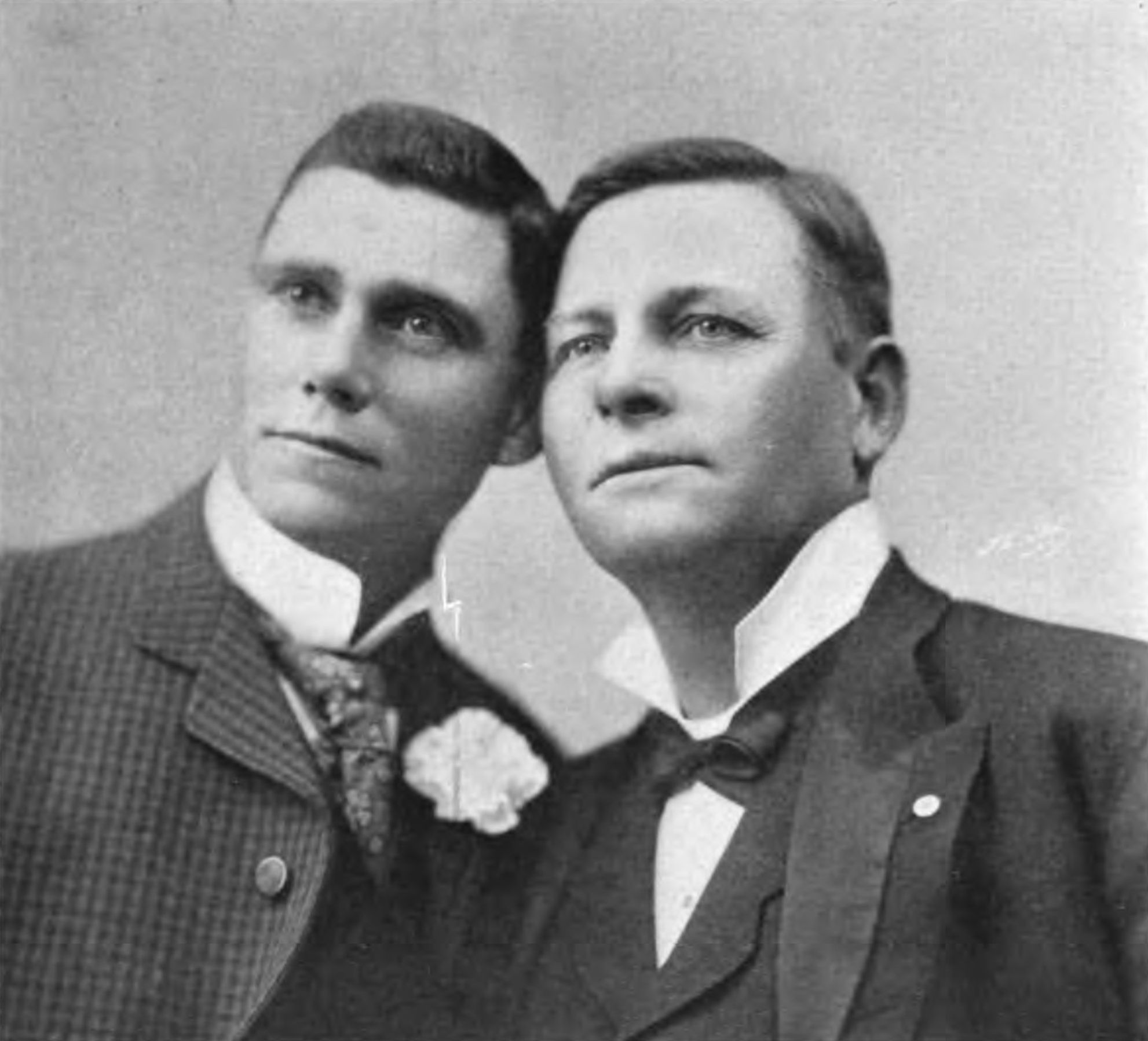
McIntyre and Heath

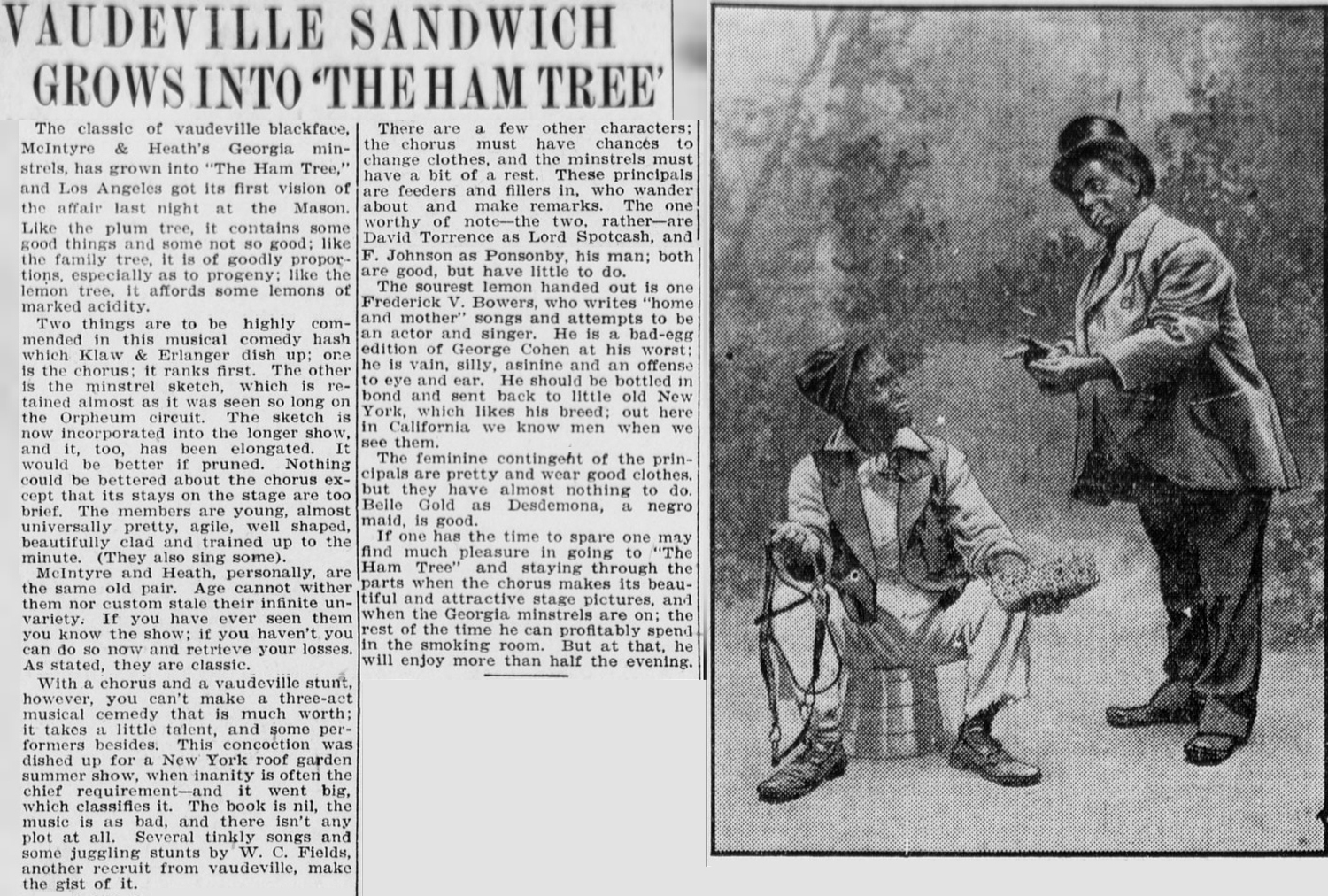

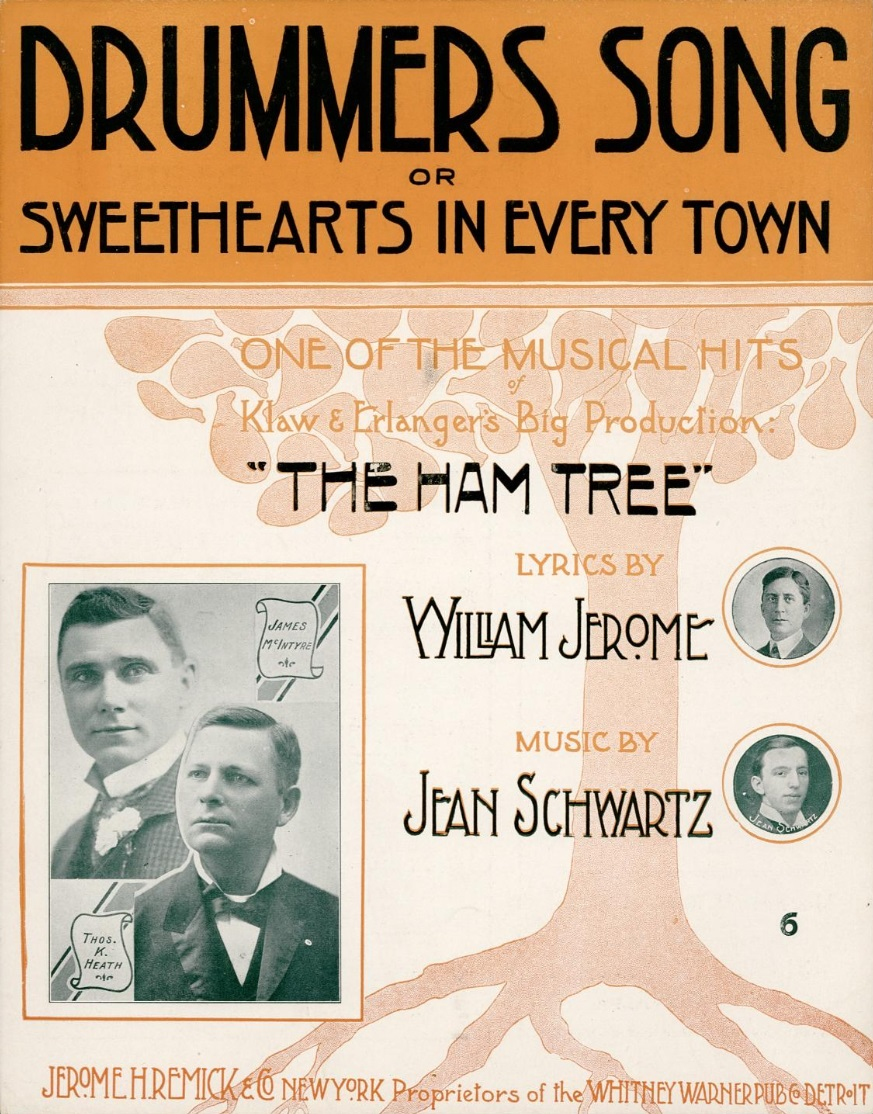

The Ham Tree is a "musical vaudeville" in three acts with music by Jean Schwartz, lyrics by William Jerome, and a book by George V. Hobart. A popular success from its debut in 1905, the work toured for several years; including three separate runs on Broadway. The work was created as a starring vehicle for vaudeville and minstrel show stars James McIntyre and Thomas Heath who were known for their work as blackface performers. The work incorporated several of their prior popular routines and sketches from their work on the vaudeville stage in order to appeal to their fan base. The concept of a "ham tree", along with other humorous trees like an "egg tree", was a repeating gag in their works dating back to their performances in The Georgia Minstrels in the 1890s and early 1900s. Following its initial tour, the work was revived by McIntyre and Heath several times, and was later heavily revised and retitled Hello, Alexander for a Broadway staging in 1919.

== Plot ==
Setting: Marion, North Carolina (Act 1); the Dover, Delaware region (Act 2); and New York City (Act 3)

McIntyre and Heath reprised their well known African-American characters of Alexander Hambletonian (McIntyre) and Henry Jones (Heath) which they had previously portrayed in minstrel shows and in vaudeville. Played as "lovable tramps and scamps", the first act begins with the characters stranded in a small North Carolina town where Hambletonian pretends to be a Raja and Heath his chief minister in order to obtain free room and board at a local establishment. The second act finds the pair having a series of mis-adventures by a railroad track and in a dark wood where they are desperately seeking food; ultimately discovering a tree that grows hams. The final act brings the pair into the palatial New York City mansion of Lawrence Nickelbacker and his autocratic wife, Mrs. Nickelbacker; a house located on Fifth Avenue. The villain of the piece is the English Lord Spotcash, and the work's loose plot also included a man of mystery, Sherlock Baffles.

== Performance history ==
Produced by Klaw and Erlanger and directed by Herbert Gresham, The Ham Tree premiered in Rochester, New York on August 17, 1905 at the Lyceum Theatre. It then transferred to Broadway's New York Theatre where it opened on August 28, 1905. It continued to run at that theatre until November 11, 1905 where it closed after 90 performances. The original production included a young W. C. Fields whose skills as both a comic and juggler were put on display in the role of Sherlock Baffles. Others in the original cast included Alfred Fisher as Lawrence Nickelbacker, Jobyna Howland as Mrs. Nickelbacker, David Torrence as the English Lord Spotcash, Belle Gold as Desdemona, and Ernest Everhart as Forrest Huff. Tenor Harry Tally was a featured singer in the show; although the name of his character has either been lost or possibly was simply his own name. Tally's character sang the show's hit song "Goodbye, Sweet Old Manhattan Isle".

The Ham Tree toured the United States after leaving the New York Theatre; and ultimately returned to Broadway for two additional runs in 1906; the first at the Grand Opera House and the second again at the New York Theatre.

A popular success for McIntyre and Heath, the duo continued to tour in The Ham Tree in successive years; occasionally reviving the work. The 1919 Broadway musical, Hello, Alexander was a heavily revised version of The Ham Tree; as it incorporated music and material from this work, but with a new book by Edgar Smith and Emily M. Young and new lyrics by Alfred Bryan.
