= Lew Pollack =

American song composer & musician (1895–1946)

- Born: July 16, 1895; New York City, New York, US
- Died: January 18, 1946 (aged 50) Hollywood, Los Angeles, US

Lew Pollack (June 16, 1895 – January 18, 1946) was an American song composer and musician active during the 1920s and the 1930s.

== Career ==
Pollack was born in New York City, where he went to DeWitt Clinton High School and was active as a boy soprano in a choral group headed by Walter Damrosch.

Starting out as a singer and pianist in vaudeville acts, he began writing theme music for silent films before collaborating with others on popular songs. In 1914, he wrote "That's a Plenty", a rag that became an enduring Dixieland standard.

Pollack composed the music for several Broadway musicals, including The Whirl of New York and The Mimic World, among others.

Among his best-known songs are "Charmaine" and "Diane" with Ernö Rapée; "Miss Annabelle Lee"; "My Yiddishe Momme" with Jack Yellen, made famous by Sophie Tucker; "Two Cigarettes in the Dark"; "Alone with You" (from Rebecca of Sunnybrook Farm); and "At the Codfish Ball" (featured in the Shirley Temple movie Captain January with Buddy Ebsen, and later the title of a Mad Men television episode). He also collaborated with Paul Francis Webster, Sidney Clare, Sidney Mitchell, and Ned Washington, among others. He died of a heart attack in Hollywood at age 50.

== Recognition ==
Lew Pollack was elected to the Songwriters Hall of Fame in 1970.
