= Howard Emmett Rogers =

American screenwriter (1890–1971)

- Born: July 13, 1890; New York, New York, United States
- Died: August 16, 1971 (aged 81); Hollywood, California, United States
- Occupation: Writer
- Years active: 1926 – 1952 (film)

Howard Emmett Rogers (1890–1971) was an American screenwriter, playwright, lyricist, and theatre director. As a playwright he wrote the books for three Broadway musicals: The Midnight Rounders of 1920, The Century Revue (1920), and Luana (1930); the latter of which he also directed. He also wrote the lyrics to the 1922 Broadway musical Red Pepper. He was an active anti-communist member of the Screen Writers Guild. He worked for several studios during his career. Two of his last films Calling Bulldog Drummond (1951) and The Hour of 13 (1952) were made by MGM-British.

== Selected filmography ==
- Tin Gods (1926)
- So's Your Old Man (1926)
- Paradise for Two (1927)
- Feel My Pulse (1928)
- Gypsy of the North (1928)
- Speedy (1928)
- The Forward Pass (1929)
- The Bad One (1930)
- Dancers in the Dark (1932)
- Stepping Sisters (1932)
- The Nuisance (1933)
- Hold Your Man (1933)
- Don't Bet on Love (1933)
- The Mystery of Mr. X (1934)
- The Unguarded Hour (1936)
- Billy the Kid (1941)
- Eyes in the Night (1942)
- Assignment in Brittany (1943)
- The Adventures of Tartu (1943)
- Gambler's Choice (1944)
- Calling Bulldog Drummond (1951)
- The Hour of 13 (1952)

== Bibliography ==
- Donald T. Critchlow. When Hollywood Was Right: How Movie Stars, Studio Moguls, and Big Business Remade American Politics. Cambridge University Press, 2013.
- Dietz, Dan (2019). The Complete Book of 1920s Broadway Musicals. Rowman & Littlefield. ISBN 9781538112823.
- Salem, James M. (1991). A Guide to Critical Reviews: The musical, 1909-1989., Third Edition. Scarecrow Press.
- Stagg, Jerry (1968). The Brothers Shubert. Random House. ISBN 9780394417929.
