= Thomas Kurton Heath =

American actor

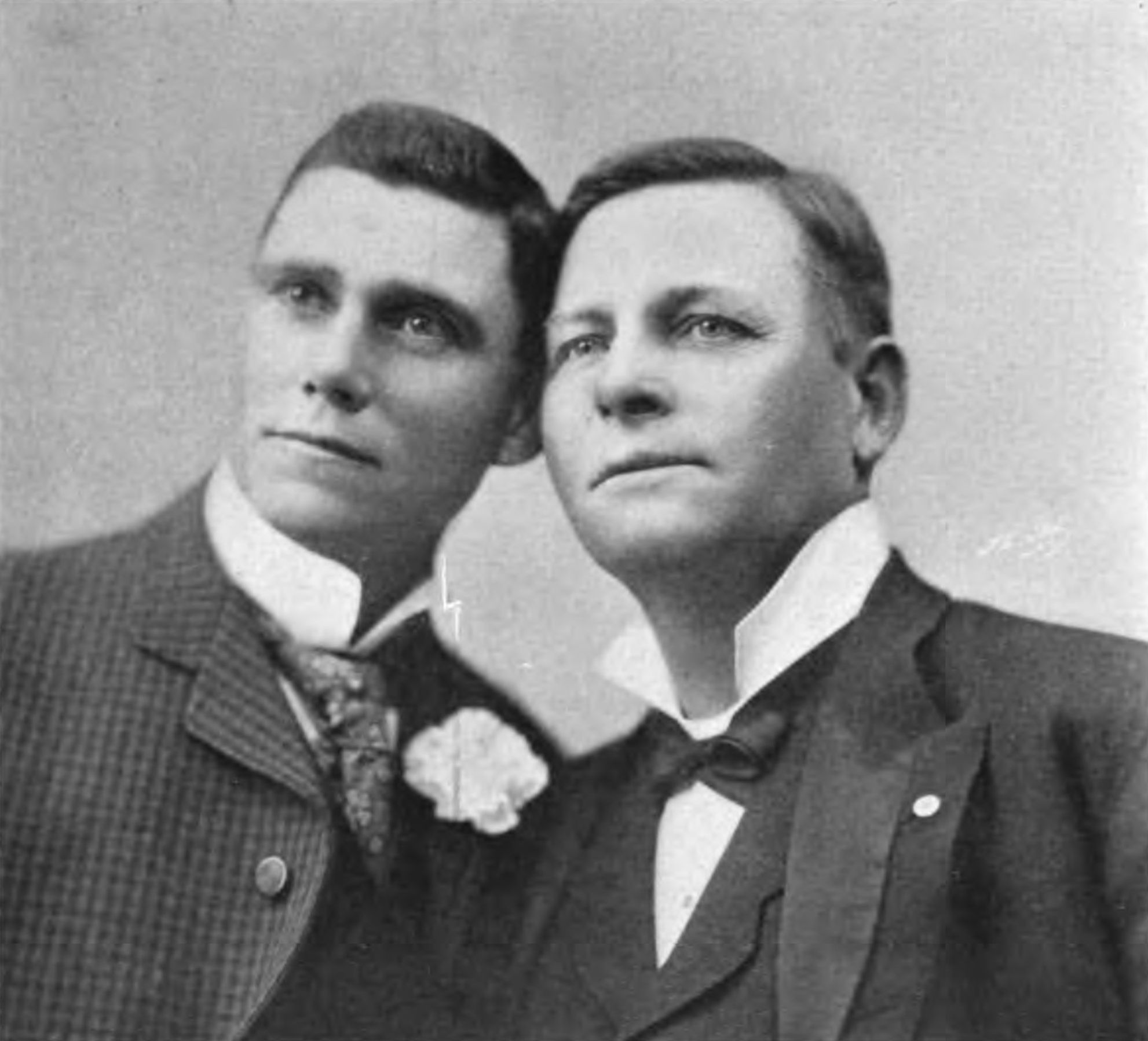
McIntyre and Heath

Thomas Kurton Heath (1853–1938) was an American vaudeville actor with James McIntyre. They started their act in 1874.

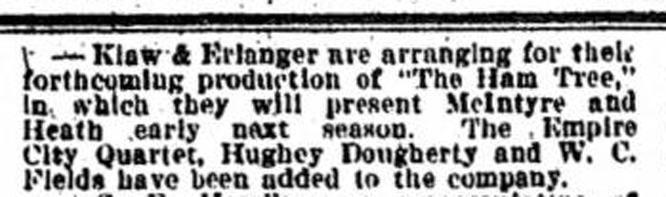
The New York Clipper 10 01 1904

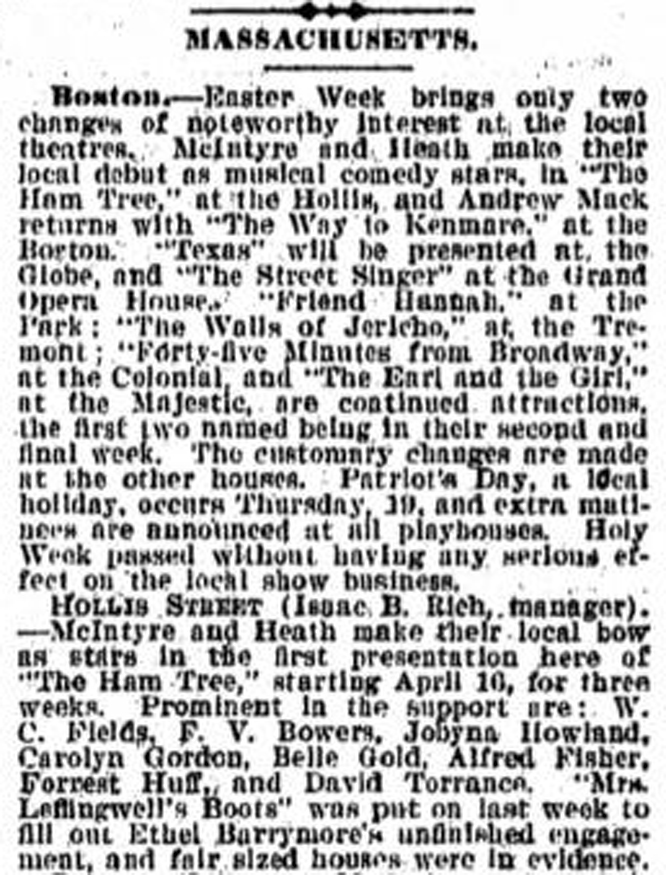
The New York Clipper 04 21 1906
