= Miss 1917 =

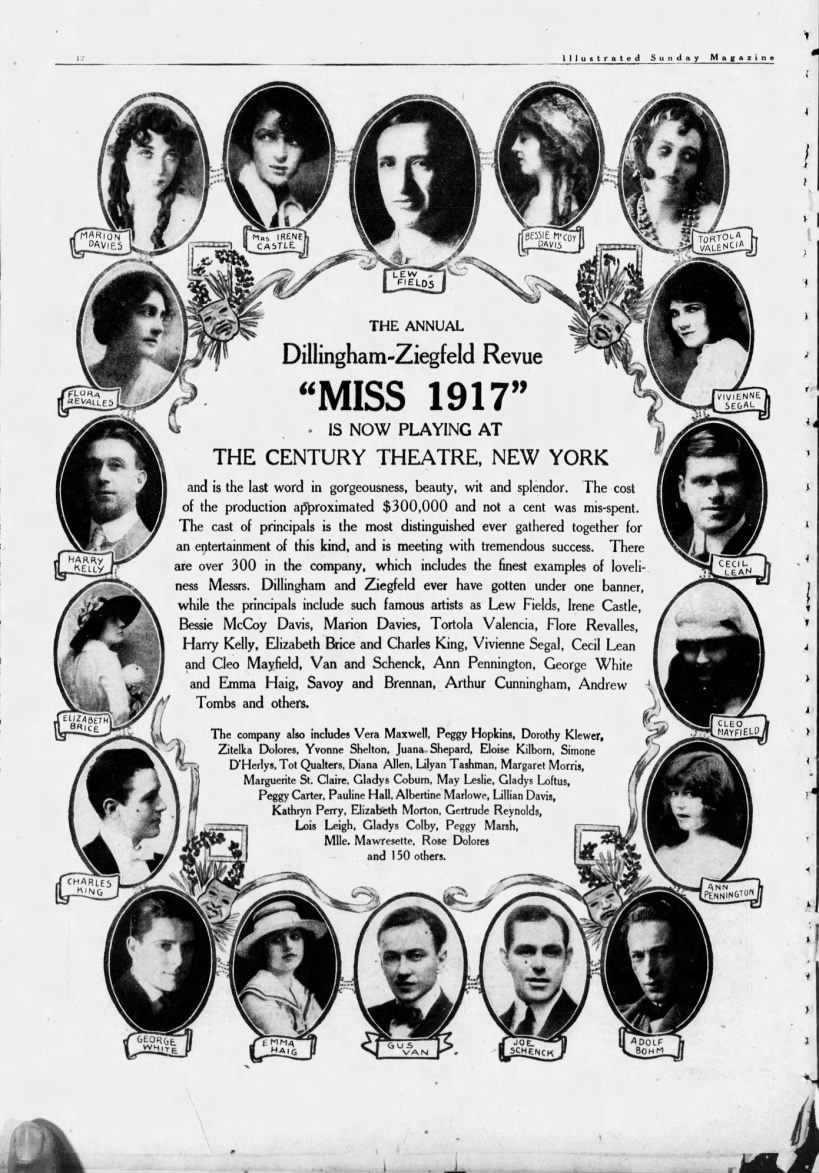
- Advertisement for Miss 1917
- Music: Victor Herbert, Jerome Kern and others
- Lyrics: Harry B. Smith, Otto Harbach, Henry Blossom and others
- Book: Guy Bolton; P. G. Wodehouse
- Productions: 1917 Broadway

Miss 1917 is a musical revue with a book by Guy Bolton and P. G. Wodehouse, music by Jerome Kern, Victor Herbert and others, and lyrics by Harry B. Smith, Otto Harbach, Henry Blossom and others. Made up of a string of vignettes, the show features songs from such musicals as The Wizard of Oz, Three Twins, Babes in Toyland, Ziegfeld Follies and The Belle of New York.

== Background ==
In 1916, Charles Dillingham and Florenz Ziegfeld produced The Century Girl, with music by Irving Berlin. Despite mildly positive reviews, the show closed without recouping its investment. On their next production, which was to be called Miss 1917, they hired Jerome Kern and Victor Herbert to compose the score and Guy Bolton and P. G. Wodehouse to collaborate on the book. Kern and Bolton had collaborated on the Princess Theatre musicals, including Very Good Eddie (1915). British humorist and playwright Wodehouse then joined them for several innovative musicals there, including Oh, Boy! (1917).

=== George Gershwin's introduction to Broadway ===
The show is mostly known today as George Gershwin's introduction to musical theatre. During rehearsals for Miss 1917, Gershwin conducted the pit orchestra and played the piano in rehearsals. He was hired in October 1917 and paid $35 per week. As the rehearsal period extended, Gershwin earned more money. He would later record Kern's "The Land Where the Good Songs Go", which was used in the revue, as a piano roll in January 1918.

While working for the show, Gershwin and his brother Ira Gershwin befriended Herbert and Kern, keeping "in contact with some of the major figures on Broadway". Sunday night concerts held in New York City by the show's cast introduced Gershwin's "There's More to a Kiss Than the Sound" and "You-oo, Just You", both with lyrics by Irving Caesar. Gershwin's talent as a composer was noticed by Harms Music, which quickly offered him a contract. His involvement with Miss 1917 also brought him to the attention of music producer Harry Askins, who in turn mentioned him to Max Dreyfus, "one of the giants of music publishing".

== 1917 Broadway production ==
The producers of the show "had demanded extremely elaborate staging for the revue", so no out-of-town tryouts were held, and the show premiered directly on Broadway on 5 November 1917, at the Century Theatre. The production was staged, directed and supervised by Ned Wayburn, with choreography by Adolph Bohm. The creative team also included set designer Joseph Urban, who built a rotating thrust stage for the theatre. Costume design was attributed to eight designers, including Paul Chaflin, Willy Pogany, and Max Weldy.

The original cast starred comedian Lew Fields, Andrew Tombes and Vivienne Segal. it also included George White, Ann Pennington, Vera Maxwell Charles King, Bessie McCoy Davis, Bert Savoy, Irene Castle, Marion Davies, Lilyan Tashman and the comedic team Van and Schenck. Kern originally wanted Segal to sing "They Didn't Believe Me" in the revue, though Dillingham and Herbert preferred her to sing "Kiss Me Again" from Mlle. Modiste. Segal's siding with the latter caused tension among the creative team. According to a member of the production crew, technical rehearsals were interrupted several times due to disagreements in staging and choreography; at one point, Kern sought to close the show early, though Ziegfeld wouldn't have it.

The show got rave reviews. Although Castle was singled out for praise by reviewers, she was unhappy performing on stage without her husband and usual dance partner Vernon Castle: "I found myself hopelessly lost as a solo number. I had no training for dancing alone and I should never have tried it." Though successful with critics, the revue failed to attract an audience; at least not enough of one to pay for the lavish production. Castle, White and others were let go by the producers, but the show still foundered in its out-of-the-way theatre. It closed on 5 January 1918, after only six weeks of performances.

=== Subsequent events ===
A month after Miss 1917 closed on Broadway, on 21 February 1918, items used in the show were sold in an auction, raising $11,300, according to The New York Times. Most of the items for auction were bought by J. J. Shubert. The following day, Sam Harrison of the New Amsterdam Theatre bought the performing rights to the musical. A London transfer, planned for March 1920, as well as a US national tour were cancelled. According to The New York Times, the creative team would not allow Ziegfeld to stage the show internationally due to planned major staging and plot changes that he hoped would make the humour more accessible to international audiences.

== Musical numbers ==
Act I

- "The Mosquitos Frolic" (Herbert)
- "The Society Farmerettes" (Herbert)
- "(We're) Crooks" (Kern)
- "Papa Would Persist in Picking Peaches" (Kern)
- "A Dancing M.D." (Kern)
- "That's the Picture I Want to See" (Kern)
- "The Honor System" (Kern)
- "Good-bye Broadway" (music by Billy Baskette; lyrics by Benny Davis and C. Francis Reisner)
- "(I'm) The Old Man in the Moon" (Kern)
- "The Land Where the Good Songs Go" (Kern)
- "Follow On" ((music by Gustav Kerker; lyrics by Hugh Morton)
- "In the Good Old Summer Time" (music by George Evans; lyrics by Ren Shields)
- "Dinah" ((music by John Stromberg; lyrics by Edgar Smith and Harry B. Smith)
- "Under the Bamboo Tree" (music and lyrics by Bob Cole and J. Rosamond Johnson)
- "(The) Yama Yama (Man)" (music by Karl Hoschna; lyrics by Otto Harbach)
- "Sammy" (music by Edward Hutchinson; lyrics by James O'Dea)
- "Kiss Me Again" (music by Herbert; lyrics by Blossom)
- "(Be My Little Baby) Bumble Bee" (music by Henry I. Marshall; lyrics by Stanley Murphy)
- "March of the Toys" (Herbert)
- "Toy Clog Dance" (Kern)

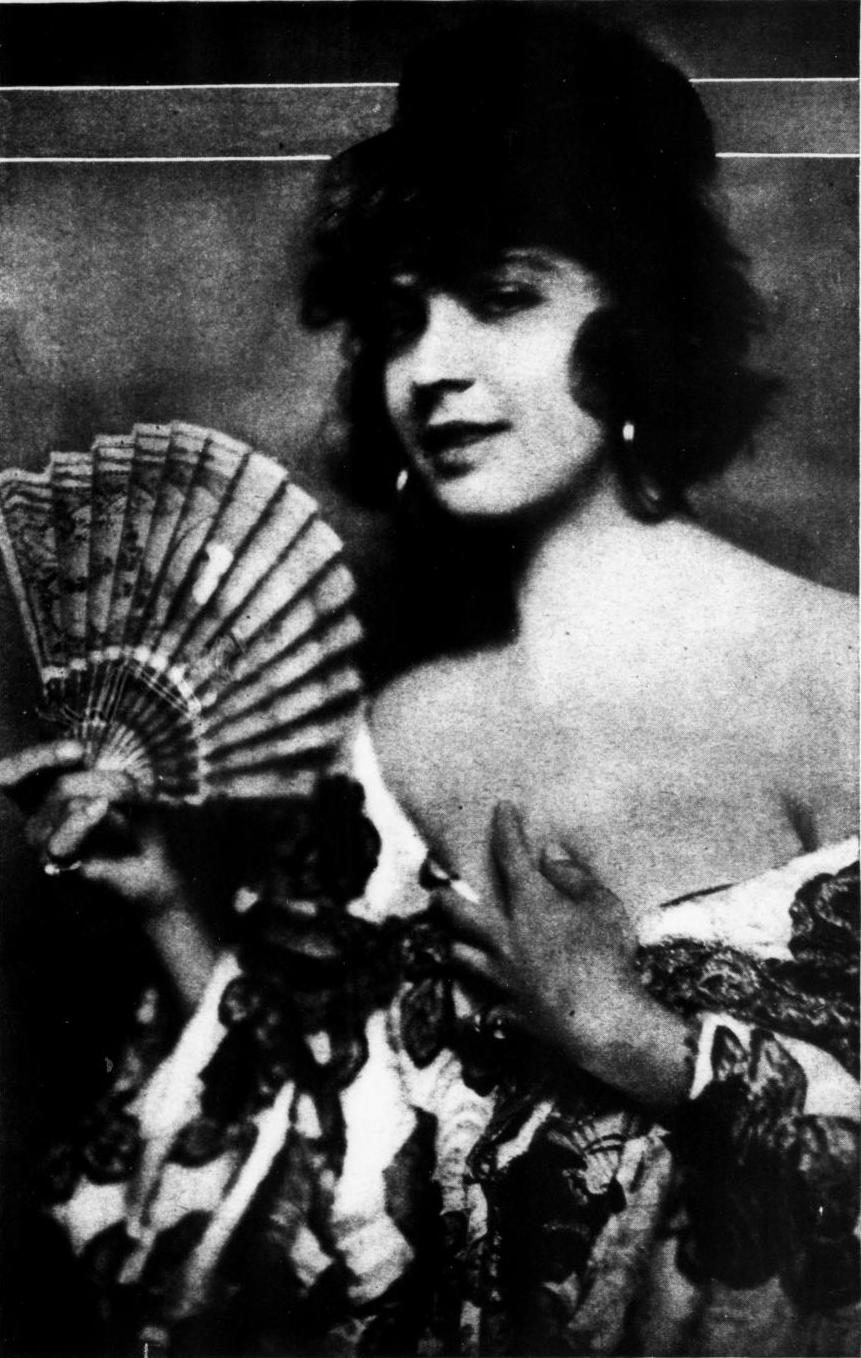
Zitelka Dolores in Miss_1917

Act II

- "We Want to Laugh" (Kern)
- "A Dancing Courtship"
- "Who's Zoo in Girl Land" (Kern)
- "Midnight in Dreamy Spain" (music and lyrics by Joseph McCarthy (composer), Joseph Schenck and Gus Van)
- "Oh What a Beautiful Baby" (music by Harry Tierney; lyrics by Stanley Murphy)
- "The Palm Beach Girl" (Kern)

== Recordings ==
Although no official cast recording was made, brief excerpts from some of the songs used in Miss 1917 can be heard on the compilation album, "Jerome Kern: Silver Linings", which was officially released on 22 July 2008.

== See also ==
- Leave It to Jane
