= Seymour Furth =

Seymour Furth (1876, New York City − May 22, 1932, Boston) was an American songwriter, composer, and librettist active from the late 1890s until his death in 1932. He wrote popular songs for Broadway musicals, vaudeville, tin pan alley, and minstrel shows; notably creating the opening musical number for the first Ziegfeld Follies in 1907. He most frequently worked as a composer with another collaborator serving as his lyricist, but sometimes he created both music and lyrics, and at other times just words with other composers. He composed piano works in popular styles of his day, including ragtime. His best known songs were comedic, including "Nothing Like That in Our Family" (1906) and "No Wedding Bells For Me" (1907).

== Life and career ==
A native of New York City, Furth was born in 1876. He attended grammar school at P. S. 86, located on the hill at Lexington Avenue and 96th Street in New York City, graduating in 1892. He began his career writing songs for vaudeville and minstrel shows in the late 1890s; often with a humorous character. In 1906 vaudeville entertainer William F. Denny recorded his song "Nothing Like That in Our Family" for Edison Records. He published two ragtime compositions for piano, That Spanish Rag and Pinochle Rag (1911, Joseph Morris publisher).

Furth contributed music to The Follies of 1907, the first Ziegfeld Follies. One of the pieces he contributed to this production was the music for the opening song of the work, "My Pocohontas", with lyricist Edgar Selden. Exhibiting elements of the Indianist movement, the piece attempted to merge American Indian musical ideas with Western classical music as it told the story of Pocahontas and John Smith. Concurrently, Furth contributed the music to the song "Dixie Dan" for the Broadway show The Gay White Way (1907); a song which became a hit for singer Blanche Ring. Written in the musical style of dixieland and drawing inspiration from minstrelsy, its lyrics by Will D. Cobb were emblematic of the racist stereotypes prevalent in that form of entertainment.

Also in 1907, Furth co-authored the song "No Wedding Bells For Me" with E. P. Moran and Will A. Heelan for an adapted version (and United States premiere) of the Edwardian musical comedy The Orchid. This latter song became his most popular success. Outside of its origins it was used to accompany silent films. Vaudeville star Trixie Friganza frequently performed the work in her act, with queer studies scholar Wendy L. Rouse arguing that the song's queer subtext allowed Friganza to challenge the heteronormativity of her day through that song. Another vaudeville star, Bob Roberts, also became associated with the song. In addition to performing it in concerts, he recorded the work for Edison Records in 1907.

Other Broadway musicals which Furth contributed music and/or lyrics to included The Wizard of Oz (1902), The Rollicking Girl (1905), Patsy in Politics (1907), Nearly a Hero (1908), The Mimic World (1908), The Girl and the Wizard (1909), Ziegfeld Follies of 1915, and Bringing Up Father (1925). He composed the music to the World War I song “When the "Yanks" Come Marching Home”. This song is included in the collection at the Pritzker Military Museum & Library.

Furth died of a heart attack on May 22, 1932, at the Commonwealth Hotel in Boston, where he had lived for several years, at age 55. He was survived by his wife, brother, and mother.
