= Emma Haig =

Early 20th-century American dancer and actress

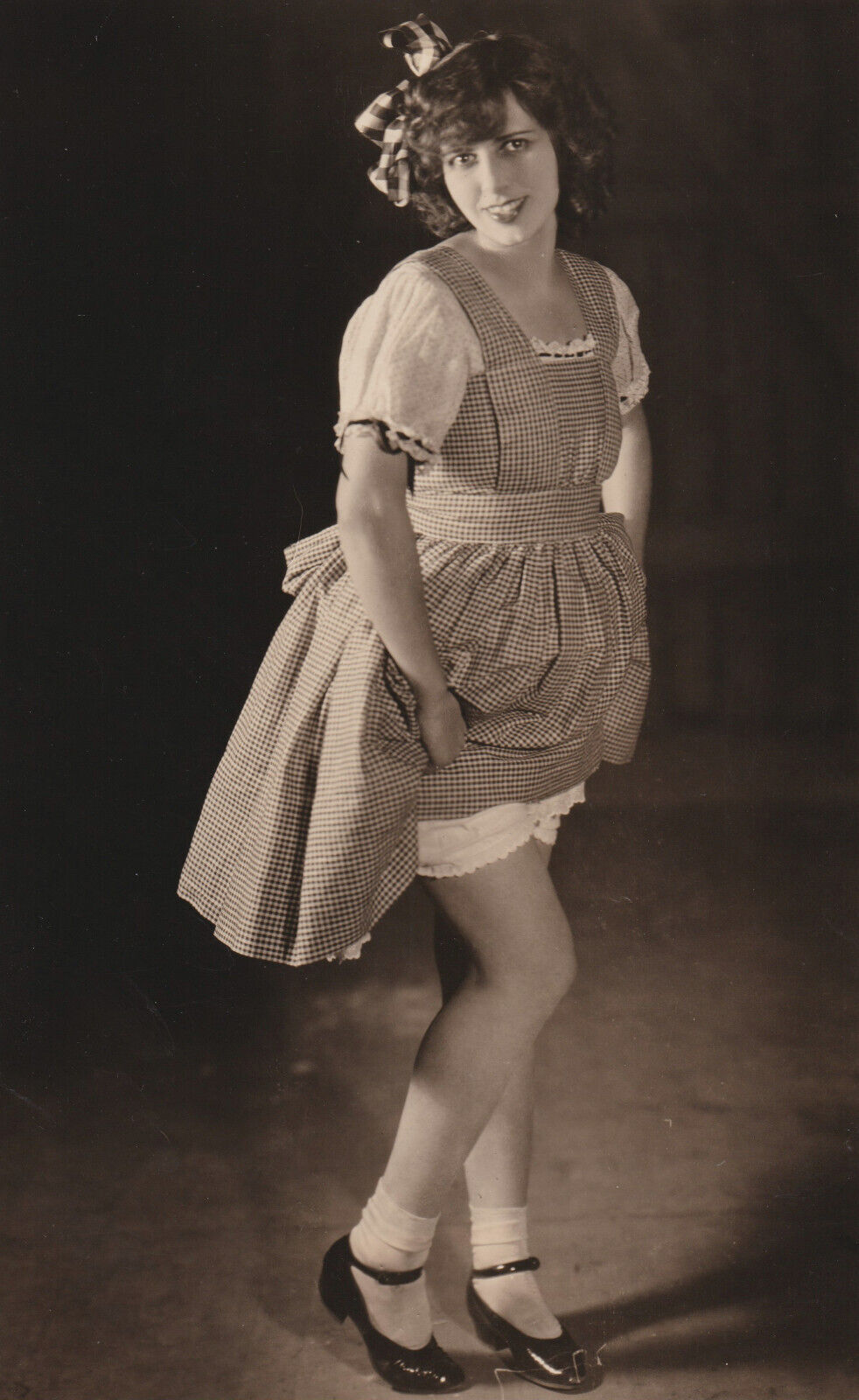
- Emma Haig, 1922
- Born: Emma Haig McGowan; January 21, 1898; Philadelphia, Pennsylvania, U.S.
- Died: June 9, 1939 (aged 41); Hollywood, California, U.S.
- Occupations: Dancer; Actress
- Years active: 1915–1928
- Spouse(s): Arthur Gladstone "Dustbowl" Fowler, February 5, 1928-death

Emma Haig (January 21, 1898 – June 9, 1939) was an American dancer and actress known for her performance in Broadway musicals, including the Ziegfeld Follies.

== Early life ==
Emma Haig McGowan was born in 1898, in Philadelphia, Pennsylvania. Almost nothing is known of her early life. An August 1914 news article noted that H. Hickman Walton Jr., and Miss Emma Haig of New York were traveling to Richmond, Virginia, to organize dance classes.

== Stage career ==
In January 1915, Emma Haig was announced as a cast member of the Ziegfeld Follies show in Cincinnati, Ohio. From then, Haig is regularly publicized as a headliner (along with Ann Pennington, Bert Williams, and W.C. Fields) for the national tour until the April 1916 show in Hartford, Connecticut (where she is billed as Emma Mabel Haig). Haig was featured in the Ziegfeld Follies of 1916 as "Puck, a specialty dancer."

She went on to star in many more Broadway shows, including:

- Miss 1917 (1917–1918)
- Hitchy-Koo (1918)
- The Magic Melody (1919–1920)
- The Music Box Revue (1921–1922)
- Our Nell (1922–1923)
- The Rise of Rosie O'Reilly (1923–1924)
- Tell Me More (1925)

Haig performed on Vaudeville in solo acts as well as with various dance partners. George White was her partner until Jack Waldron replaced him; Waldron and Haig danced together at Henderson's on Coney Island in June 1919. A critic reviewing her 1919 solo act at New York City's Palace Theatre described her as "A whirlwind of speed, a gifted kicker, and a tireless worker," but said that without a partner "that touch of gracefulness and team rhythm is missing."

In 1922, Haig fell off the stage during a performance of the Music Box Revue and suffered a broken spine. Told she would never dance again, Haig managed to Broadway a year later.

Variety covered her 1923 show at the New York Palace Theatre and called it "The best act little Emma Haig showed in or out of Vaudeville." She "Reels off her several styles of legmania, ankle bends, trick pirouettes and light acrobatics—and off she whisks to a hit." She ended the act well: "The finale, with her most difficult steps gets the tiny lady off heartily liked... This is the first-rate number for any bill and a headliner for the average big-time house, especially West, where Miss Haig is a favorite."

In 1927 Haig starred in The Girl Friend at the London Palace Theatre and received rave reviews. Calling the show "the best musical comedy in town," one critic said Haig was "One of the most delightful musical comedy artistes I have ever seen. She is a comedian of the very first rank, with a most elfin charm and a capacity for saying impudent things delightfully. The whole time she was on the stage an electric atmosphere circled between her and her audience."

Haig returned to London's Palace Theatre in 1928 in Virginia, for which she also received good reviews. A critic referred to her as "A continual joy... gloriously comic, but always bright and reassuring. Just to hear her voice is like waking from an uneasy dream to know that everything is all right. And how wonderfully she can dance."

She appeared in Silver Wings at the London Dominion Theatre in 1930 with Art Fowler and Lupino Lane, and at the London Palladium early in 1931 for the show More Squabbles.

She retired from the stage in 1931.

== Personal life ==
Haig married actor and musician Arthur Gladstone "Dustbowl" Fowler in 1928 at the Savoy Chapel in London, England.

She and Fowler reportedly ran antique shops in Newport, Rhode Island and Manhattan after she left the stage in 1931.

== Death ==
Haig died on June 9, 1939, of a heart attack. She was cremated at Grand View Crematory in Glendale, California.
