= Germaine Mitti =

French dancer

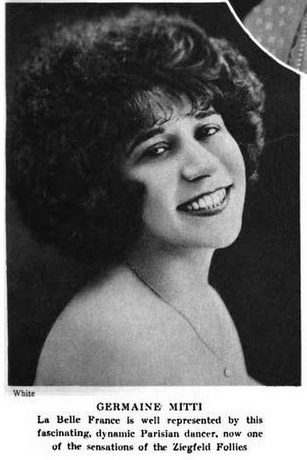
Germaine Mitti, from a 1921 publication.

Germaine Mitti (born about 1898), also known as Germaine Mitty, was a French dancer who appeared with the Ziegfeld Follies and in vaudeville revues of the 1920s.

== Early life ==
Germaine Mitti, who was born around 1898, may have been of Basque origin. She was described as a student of Louise Stichel.

== Career ==
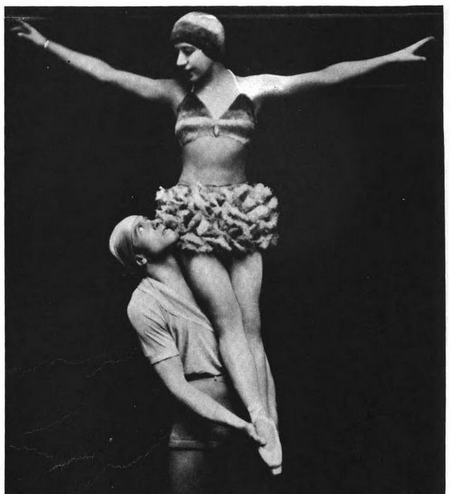
Germaine Mitti from a 1921 publication, with Eugene Tillio

Germaine Mitti and her partner Eugene Tillio appeared with the Ziegfeld Follies of 1921. Their act was considered one of the show's highlights by reviewers, one of whom noted that "Mitti is a slight little woman with a sympathetic face and manner, and a lithe body, as full of grace and energy as a young panther." She was part of the elaborate tableaux of stage designer Ben Ali Haggin, and wore a costume so minimal it was said to fit "in the palm of her hand."

Later in 1921 Mitti was in the cast of the revue Fan of the Fayre in London, and in 1923 she and Tillio were headlining at the Orpheum Theatre in Winnipeg. They returned to the Ziegfeld Follies in 1924. In 1927, Mitti and Tillio were a specialty act in the revue Rufus LeMaire's Affairs.

== Personal life ==
Mitti was described as an "ardent sportswoman" who enjoyed skating, swimming, tennis, boxing, and equestrian activities. She married theatre composer and conductor Laurent Halet (1863–1932).
