= The Follies of 1907 =

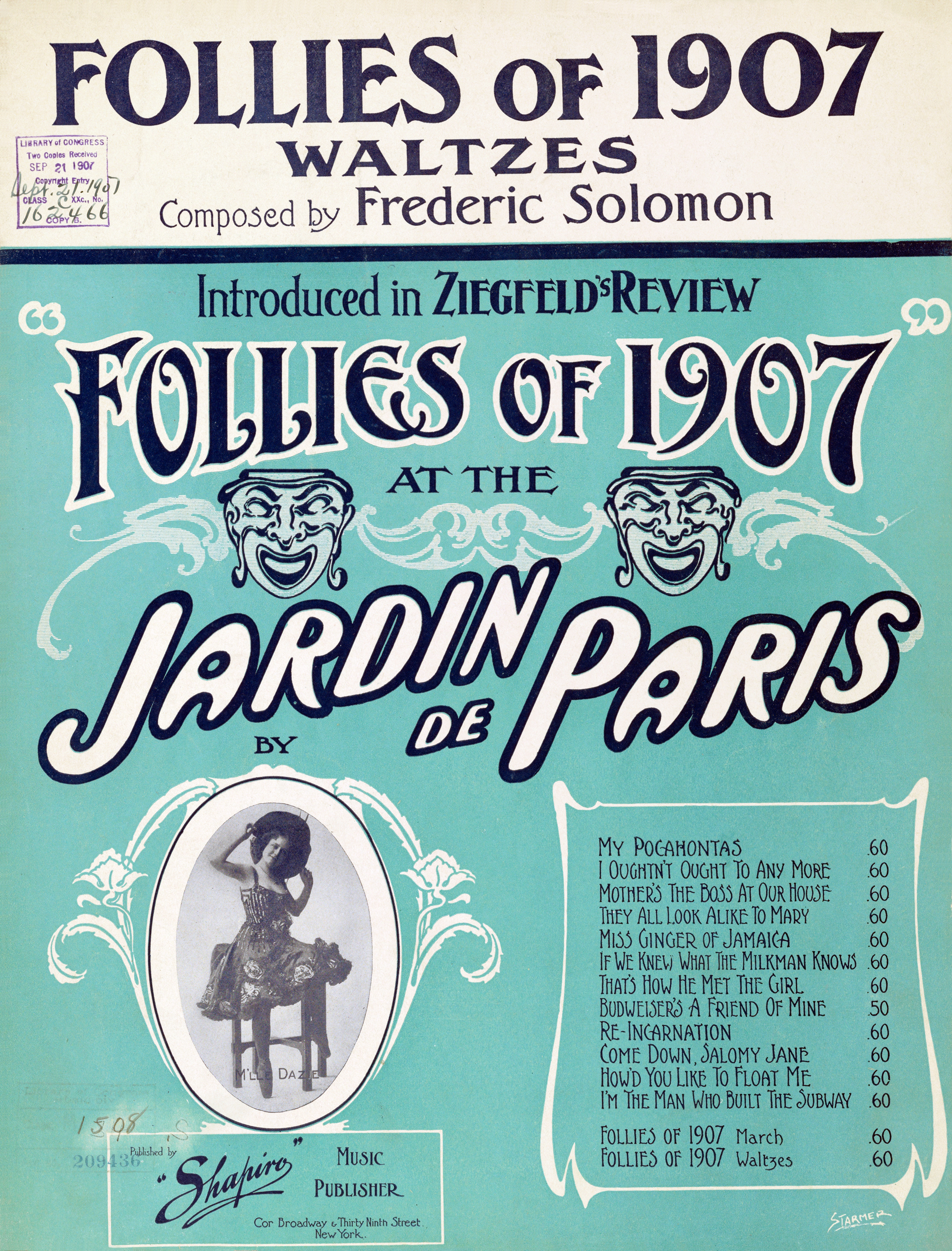
Front cover of sheet music for waltzes from the show Follies of 1907

The Follies of 1907 is a 1907 musical revue which was conceived and produced by Florenz Ziegfeld Jr. The first of two dozen theatrical revues that are collectively known as the Ziegfeld Follies, the work featured material written by a variety of individuals, including music by Seymour Furth, E. Ray Goetz, Gus Edwards, Billy Gaston, Jean Schwartz, Silvio Hein, Matt Woodward and Gertrude Hoffman; lyrics by Vincent Bryan, Edgar Selden, Will D. Cobb, Billy Gaston, William Jerome, Matt Woodward, Martin Brown and Paul West; and comic and dramatic sketches by Harry B. Smith used in-between and around the musical numbers; Smith also served as head lyricist. Herbert Gresham staged the production, and Max Hoffman, Sr. served as the musical director.

The Follies of 1907 premiered at the Savoy Theatre in Atlantic City, New Jersey, on July 3, 1907, for tryout performances prior to its presentation on Broadway. The revue premiered on Broadway at the Olympia Theatre on July 8, 1907. For these performances the Olympia Theatre was renamed the Jardin de Paris, after the Parisian theatre that housed the Moulin Rouge, a reflection of the Follies pulling inspiration from the Paris stage. It ran until November 10, 1907, transferring to two other theatres, and playing for 79 performances. The production included entertainers from vaudeville, such as singer Emma Carus, actresses Grace La Rue and Lillian Lee, actor Charley Ross, comediennes Florence Tempest and Harry Watson Jr., dancer Mademoiselle Dazie, and the troupe of chorus girls from Anna Held's touring company, among others.

== Structure ==
The Follies of 1907 consisted of a series of independent musical, dance and comic sketches that were connected through a loose plot in which romanticized historical figures of explorer John Smith and Pocahontas are introduced to "modern life" in America in 1907. The opening scene featured Grace La Rue as the Native American woman singing "My Pocahontas", which recounts the legend of her relationship with Smith. This was followed by John Smith proclaiming his love for Pocahontas in song. This opening music by Seymour Furth exemplified the exoticism of the Indianist movement by combining European styles of music with Native American ones.

In subsequent sketches set in the United States, Smith and Pocohontas periodically appear as observers and commentators of the proceedings; most of them not geographically or chronologically connected to the Jamestown settlement. Some of these scenes featured satirical portrayals of contemporary American figures such as President Theodore Roosevelt, journalist William Randolph Herst, lawyer and politician Chauncey Depew, humorist and author Mark Twain, and Christian moralist and politician Anthony Comstock. One scene lifted musical excerpts from Gilbert and Sullivan's Trial by Jury and featured a parody of the American justice system in which operatic tenor Enrico Caruso is put on trial for pinching a woman. In the scene, Caruso's defense counsel, played by Harry Watson Jr., is William Travers Jerome, a man known at the time for prosecuting Harry Kendall Thaw whose "crime of the century" involved the murder of Stanford White, who was having an affair with his wife, the actress Evelyn Nesbit. The scene is largely a parody of the Thaw trial.

== Musical numbers ==
=== Act 1 ===
- (My) Pocahontas (music by Seymour Furth; lyrics by Edgar Selden)
- Budweiser (Budweiser's a Friend of Mine) (music by Furth; lyrics by Vincent Bryan)
- Little Murad
- Mother's the Boss of Our House (music and lyrics by Herbert Ingraham)
- Re-Incarnation (music by E. Ray Goetz; lyrics by Bryan)
- Finale: I Want to be a Drummer Boy (music by Silvio Hein; lyrics by Matt Woodward)

=== Act 2 ===
- The Man Who Built the Subway (music by Max Hoffmann; lyrics by Bryan)
- Cigarette (music by Hoffmann; lyrics by Bryan)
- (They) All Look Alike to Mary (music and lyrics by Billy Kent)
- That's What the Rose Said to Me (music by Gus Edwards; lyrics by Will D. Cobb)
- A Foolish Song
- Meet Me with Spangles and Bells On (music and lyrics by Martin Brown)
- (The) Band Box Girl (music by Furth; lyrics by Selden)
- The Gibson Bathing Girls (lyrics by Paul West)
- Come and Float Me, Freddie Dear (How'd You Like to Float Me) (music by Goetz; lyrics by Bryan)
- In the Surf / The Heart Breaker
- The Fencing Girls (music by Goetz; lyrics by Bryan)
- I Don't Want an Auto (music by Furth; lyrics by William Jerome)
- Bye-Bye, Dear Old Broadway
- On the Grand Old Sands (music by Edwards; lyrics by Cobb)
- That's How He Met the Girl (music by Goetz; lyrics by Bryan)
- I Think I Oughtn't Auto Anymore (music by Goetz; lyrics by Jerome)
- Miss Ginger of Jamaica (music and lyrics by Billy Gaston)
- Handle Me with Care (music by Jean Schwartz; lyrics by Jerome)
- Jiu Jitsu Waltz
- If We Knew What the Milkman Knows (music by Goetz; lyrics by Bryan)
- (Come Down) Salomy Jane (music by Goetz; lyrics by Bryan)
- La Kraquette (music by Frederick Solomon)
