= West of the Water Tower =

1923 film

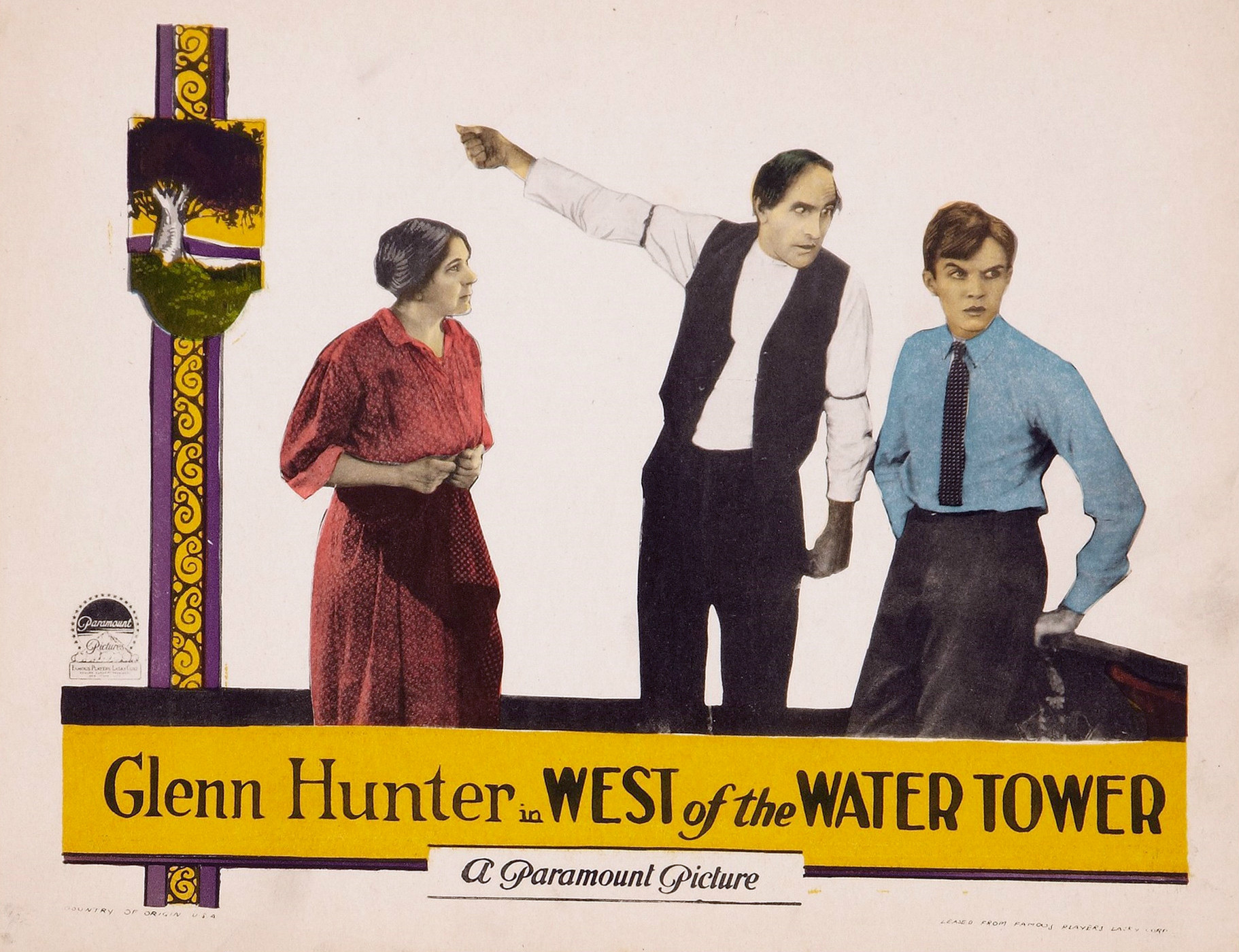
- Lobby card
- Directed by: Rollin S. Sturgeon
- Written by: Lucien Hubbard (adaptation); Doris Schroeder (scenario)
- Based on: West of the Water Tower by Homer Croy
- Produced by: Adolph Zukor; Jesse Lasky
- Starring: Glenn Hunter; May McAvoy; Ernest Torrence; George Fawcett
- Cinematography: Harry B. Harris
- Distributed by: Paramount Pictures
- Release date: December 30, 1923 (New York City)
- Running time: 8 reels; 7,432 feet
- Country: United States
- Language: Silent (English intertitles)

West of the Water Tower is a 1923 American silent comedy drama film produced by Famous Players–Lasky and distributed by Paramount Pictures. It was directed by Rollin S. Sturgeon and is based on the novel of the same name by Homer Croy. Glenn Hunter and May McAvoy are the stars of this film.

== Plot ==
As described in a film magazine review, Guy Plummer, the son of the small town's orthodox, narrow minded clergyman, becomes involved in a love affair with Bee Chew, the daughter of a wealthy atheist. They wed in secret through the aid of Cod Dugan, a poolroom operator. When Bee is about to become a mother, the two are unable to provide proof of the marriage. She goes away and later returns with the baby. Guy tells his father, who then admits that he, too, similarly sinned in his youth and decides to give up his pulpit. In the end, Guy wins back the favorable opinion of his neighbors, the existence of the marriage is proven, and the young couple find happiness.

== Cast ==
- Glenn Hunter as Guy Plummer
- May McAvoy as Bee Chew
- Ernest Torrence as Adrian Plummer
- George Fawcett as Charles Chew
- ZaSu Pitts as Dessie Arnhalt
- Charles S. Abbe as R.N. Arnhalt (credited as Charles Abbe)
- Anne Schaefer as Mrs. Plummer
- Riley Hatch as Cod Dugan
- Allen Baker as Ed Hoecker
- Jack Terry as Harlan Thompson
- Edward Elkas as Wolfe
- Alice Mann as Pal
- Gladys Feldman as Tootsie

== Preservation ==
With no copies of West of the Water Tower located in any film archives, it is a lost film.
