= When the "Yanks" Come Marching Home =

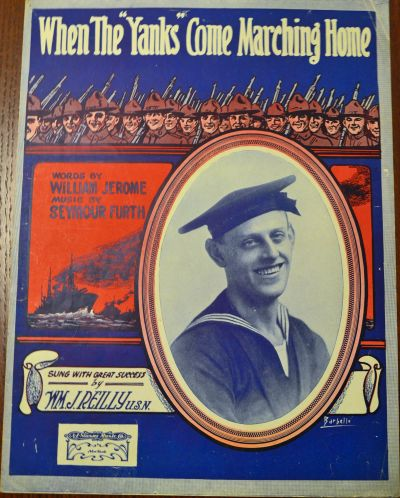
- Sheet music cover

Song
- Released: 1917
- Composer: Seymour Furth
- Lyricist: William Jerome

"When the 'Yanks' Come Marching Home" is a World War I era song released in 1917. William Jerome wrote the lyrics. Seymour Furth composed the music. It was published by A.J. Stansy Music Co. of New York City.

Artist Albert Wilfred Barbelle designed the sheet music cover. It features a group of smiling soldiers marching and a steam ship sailing away. There is also an inset photo that varies per edition. One version has a photo of Nora Bayes, who also performed the song. Another cover features William J. Reilly, USN, who also performed the song. The song was written for both voice and piano. The sheet music can be found at Pritzker Military Museum & Library.

The lyrics carry a hopeful tone, although it begins with soldiers off at war. The person speaking prays that God will keep them safe and that they come home soon. The chorus is as follows:

For there'll be smiles and cheers and miles of tears
When the "Yanks" come marching home
There'll be tears enough you know
to make a dozen rivers flow
Dressed in their torn and tattered suits of tan
From battlefields across the foam
Hearts will beat with joy for every boy
When the "Yanks" come marching home
