= Arizona Trail (film) =

1943 film

- Directed by: Vernon Keays
- Screenplay by: William Lively
- Produced by: Oliver Drake
- Starring: Tex Ritter
- Cinematography: William A. Sickner
- Edited by: Alvin Todd
- Production company: Universal Pictures
- Distributed by: Universal Pictures
- Release date: September 15, 1943 (United States)
- Running time: 57 minutes
- Country: United States
- Language: English

Arizona Trail is a 1943 American Western film directed by Vernon Keays and starring Tex Ritter.

== Plot ==
A singing cowboy comes home to help his family fight a land-grabber.

== Cast ==
- Tex Ritter as Johnny Trent
- Fuzzy Knight as Kansas
- Dennis Moore as Wayne Carson
- Janet Shaw as Martha Brooks (as Wayne Trent in credits)
- Jack Ingram as Ace Vincent
- Erille Anderson as Dan Trent
- Joseph J. Greene as Dr. J.D. 'Doc' Wallace (as Joseph Greene)
- Glenn Strange as Matt
- Dan White as Sheriff Jones
- Art Fowler as Henchman Curley
- Johnny Bond as Red, Red River Valley Boy
- Red River Valley Boys as musicians / cowhands
