= Florence Tempest =

American comedian and dancer

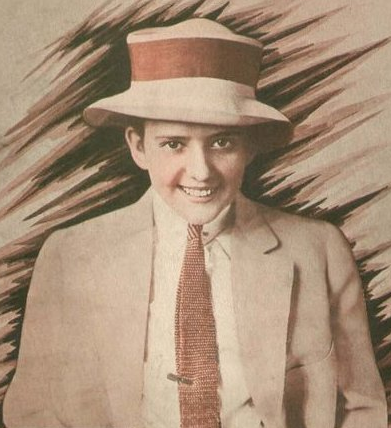
- Florence Tempest, from sheet music published in 1913.
- Born: Claire Lillian Ijames; June 25, 1889; Louisville, Kentucky
- Died: After January 1932
- Other names: Florenze Tempest
- Occupation: vaudeville performer
- Years active: 1907-1932
- Known for: "Sunshine and Tempest", an act with her sister, Marion Sunshine

Florence Tempest (born Claire Lillian Ijames, June 25, 1889 — died after January 1932), sometimes billed as Florenze Tempest, was an American comedian and dancer, a vaudeville and musical theatre performer, best known as part of "Sunshine and Tempest" with her sister, Marion Sunshine.

== Early life ==
Claire Lillian Ijames described herself as "born in Louisville"; other sources give Richmond, Virginia as her hometown. Her parents were Edward Henry Ijames and Mary Henesey Ijames. About 1901, Mary Henesey Ijames moved to New York City as a widow, with her young daughters June (or Junie), Claire (or Clara), and Mary (or Marion). The sisters sometimes performed as a trio act.

== Career ==
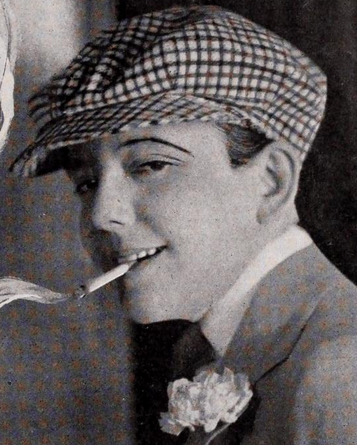
Florence Tempest, from the cover of sheet music for "You Ought to See Her Now" (1919).

Florence Tempest had a vaudeville act with her younger sister, Marion Sunshine; "I always played the boy, while Marion was my sweetheart", Tempest explained. They toured with their mother. Tempest's act was admired not only for its humor but also for its technical ingenuity: "Florence Tempest has conceived and put into effect the most unique fashion of hair dressing for her boy characterization", commented one reviewer, "Her own front and side hair is combed into the wig and makes and excellent boy's pompadour without the suspicion of girlish coiffure." The duo made a short silent film, Sunshine and Tempest (1915), in which they played telepathic twin sisters in the Tennessee mountains.

Tempest also had a headlining solo act, again playing masculine characters, but also donning a gown as the only female character in her "College Town" act, with "Ten 'Rah-Rah' Boys" as her chorus. She was described as vaudeville's "Most Lovable Boy and Daintiest Girl" in a 1917 headline. She appeared on the cover art of sheet music in masculine suits and caps, in youthful poses, even smoking a cigarette; for "I Want a Boy to Love Me" (1913), she's shown lounging on a bench, a hand in her trouser pocket; for "I Love the Ladies" (1914) she appears in a boater hat and the caption "Our American Boy". In the 1920s, no longer suited to "boyish" characters, she was in a vaudeville act with her second husband, comedian Homer Dickinson; they were billed as "Broadway's Smart Couple". They were still performing together as late as 1932.

Florence Tempest appeared on Broadway in the shows Ziegfeld Follies of 1907 (1907), Little Nemo (1908–1909), H.M.S. Pinafore (1911), La Belle Paree (1911), Stop! Look! Listen! (1915–1916), and Earl Carroll's Vanities (1923). She also toured with the Ziegfeld Follies in the 1907–1908 season.

== Personal life ==
Florence Tempest married a theatrical agent, Joseph E. Shea, in 1915. They separated months later, and they divorced in 1920. By 1924 she was married again, to her vaudeville partner, Homer Dickinson.
