= Allyn King =

American actress

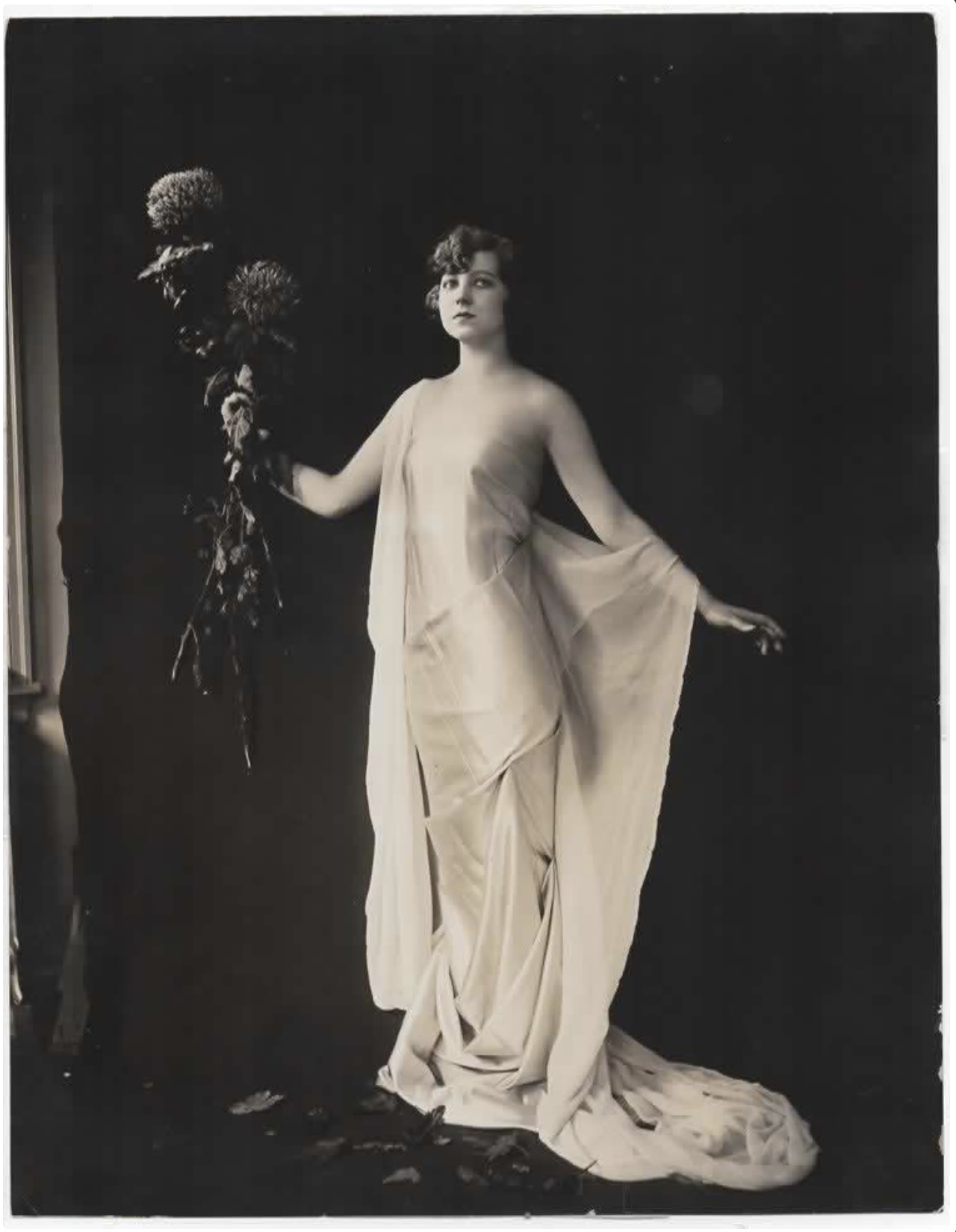
- King in 1920
- Born: February 1, 1899; North Carolina, U.S.
- Died: March 31, 1930 (aged 31); New York City, U.S.
- Resting place: Mount Hope Cemetery
- Occupations: Actress, singer
- Years active: 1914–1927

Allyn S. King (February 1, 1899 – March 31, 1930) was an American stage and film actress and singer who began her career in vaudeville, and later as a Ziegfeld Follies performer.

== Early life ==
King was born in North Carolina to Allen S. and Phoebe (née Whitaker) King. The year following her birth, the King family was living in Winston (now Winston-Salem) where her father was a medical student. Allen King was from Louisiana and, after receiving his degree in the early 1900s, returned to his home state to set up a medical practice in Morgan City. Phoebe King's family was from Goldsboro, North Carolina some 54 miles southeast of Raleigh where some press accounts indicate Allyn King later lived.

On May 19, 1909, Leroy Oliver, a 16-year-old son of a deceased doctor, walked into Dr. King's Morgan City office and fatally shot him. Oliver later told police that Dr. King had allegedly taken advantage of his sister. At the time of her husband's murder, Phoebe King and her daughters, Phoebe and Allyn, were visiting relatives in North Carolina.

== Career ==
King's stage career began at an early age. By the time she was 15, she was performing in vaudeville as a singing comedian at New York's Proctor's Twenty-Third Street Theatre, and the following year as a comedian and dancer with the Ziegfeld Midnight Frolic.

In September 1916, she replaced headliner Justine Johnstone after Johnstone quit as a result of Florenz Ziegfeld, Jr.'s refusal to let her boyfriend visit her dressing room. King would remain with Ziegfeld for five seasons before achieving a modicum of success on Broadway in the early 1920s.

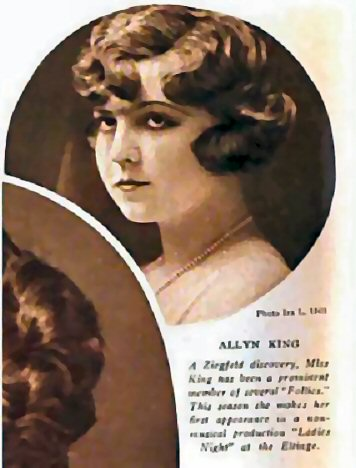
King in Theatre Magazine, 1920

She played Alicia Bonner in the 1920 Avery Hopwood hit comedy Ladies' Night that had a run of 360 performances at the Eltinge Theatre on 42nd Street and Louise Endicott in the successful 1924 William LeBaron and Con Conrad musical comedy Moonlight over its 174 run at Longacre Theatre. King toured in the 1925 play Seduction, a production that featured dancing harem girls. Her other Broadway shows, Sun Showers (1923), Florida Girl (1925) and 90 Horsepower (1926), all had short runs.

King appeared in at least one silent film, The Fighting Blade (1923), in which she played Charlotte Musgrove, the sister of Thomsine, whose lover, Dutchman Karl Van Kerstenbrook, had come to England to serve in Oliver Cromwell's army.

=== Career decline ===
In 1927, King almost died after putting herself on a near-starvation diet compounded with diet pills in an attempt to maintain the boyish figure in vogue at the time. She spent nearly two years recovering at a sanitarium before leaving to live with an aunt in New York City. King's desire to weigh some 20 to 30 pounds below her optimum weight was fueled by the following clause in her working contract.

It is expressly made a part of this agreement and is an essential part, therefore, that if at any time you should during the term of the said arrangement, increase in weight more than sixteen pounds or decrease in weight more than ten pounds or let the dimensions of any part of your figure vary more than one-half inch from the following, weight 115 pounds, neck 12 ½ inches, bust 34 inches, upper arm 11, lower arm 7 ½, waist 26, hips 34, thigh 18, calf 12, ankle 8 ½, then and in that event we shall have the right to cancel this contract upon giving you one week's notice.

After King left the sanitarium to live with her aunt, she studied music with aspirations toward a possible career in radio.

== Personal life ==
In 1924, King was reported to be engaged to Carl Wiedemann, a wealthy brewer from Newport, Kentucky and owner of the racehorse In Memoriam. Wiedemann later released the statement, "I am neither married nor engaged."

== Death ==
On March 29, 1930, King leaped from her aunt's fifth-story, New York City apartment to a courtyard below. She had left behind a note lamenting the fact that she would never return to Broadway. King survived the fall with broken limbs and a fractured skull that her doctors were confident she could recover from. Though King was alert and seemed to be in good spirits, her condition deteriorated and she died of her injuries on March 31, 1930. The year before, German actress Marietta Millner's death was also attributed to excessive dieting to meet her contractual obligations.

Nearly 200 people attended King's funeral service on April 2 at the Campbell Funeral Church on Broadway and 66th Street that was followed by a private interment attended by her mother, sister, close friends and family at Mount Hope Cemetery in Hastings-on-Hudson, New York (now called the Westchester Hills Cemetery).
