= The Fighting Blade =

1923 film by John S. Robertson

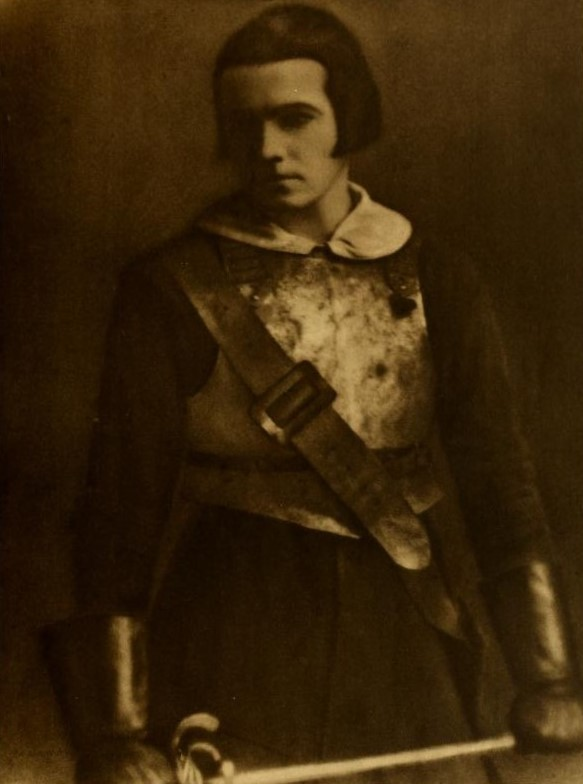
- Film still with Richard Barthelmess
- Directed by: John S. Robertson
- Screenplay by: Josephine Lovett (scenario); Don Bartlett (titles)
- Story by: Beulah Marie Dix
- Cinematography: George J. Folsey
- Production company: Inspiration Company
- Distributed by: Associated First National Pictures
- Release date: September 10, 1923
- Running time: 9 reels
- Country: United States
- Language: Silent (English intertitles)

The Fighting Blade is a 1923 American silent drama film directed by John S. Robertson and released by Associated First National Pictures.

== Cast ==
- Richard Barthelmess as Karl Van Kerstenbroock
- Dorothy Mackaill as Thomsine Musgrove
- Lee Baker as Earl of Staversham
- Morgan Wallace as Lord Robert Erisey
- Bradley Barker as Watt Musgrove
- Frederick Burton as Oliver Cromwell
- Stuart Sage as Viscount Carlsford
- Philip Tead as Lord Trevor
- Walter Horton as Bob Ayskew
- Allyn King as Charlotte Musgrove
- Marcia Harris as Joan Laycock

== Censorship ==
Before The Fighting Blade could be exhibited in Kansas, the Kansas Board of Review required the removal of a close-up of the wedge and blood dripping down an arm.

== Preservation ==
A copy of The Fighting Blade is held by the UCLA Film & Television Archive.
