= Mademoiselle Dazie =

American singer and actor (1884–1952)

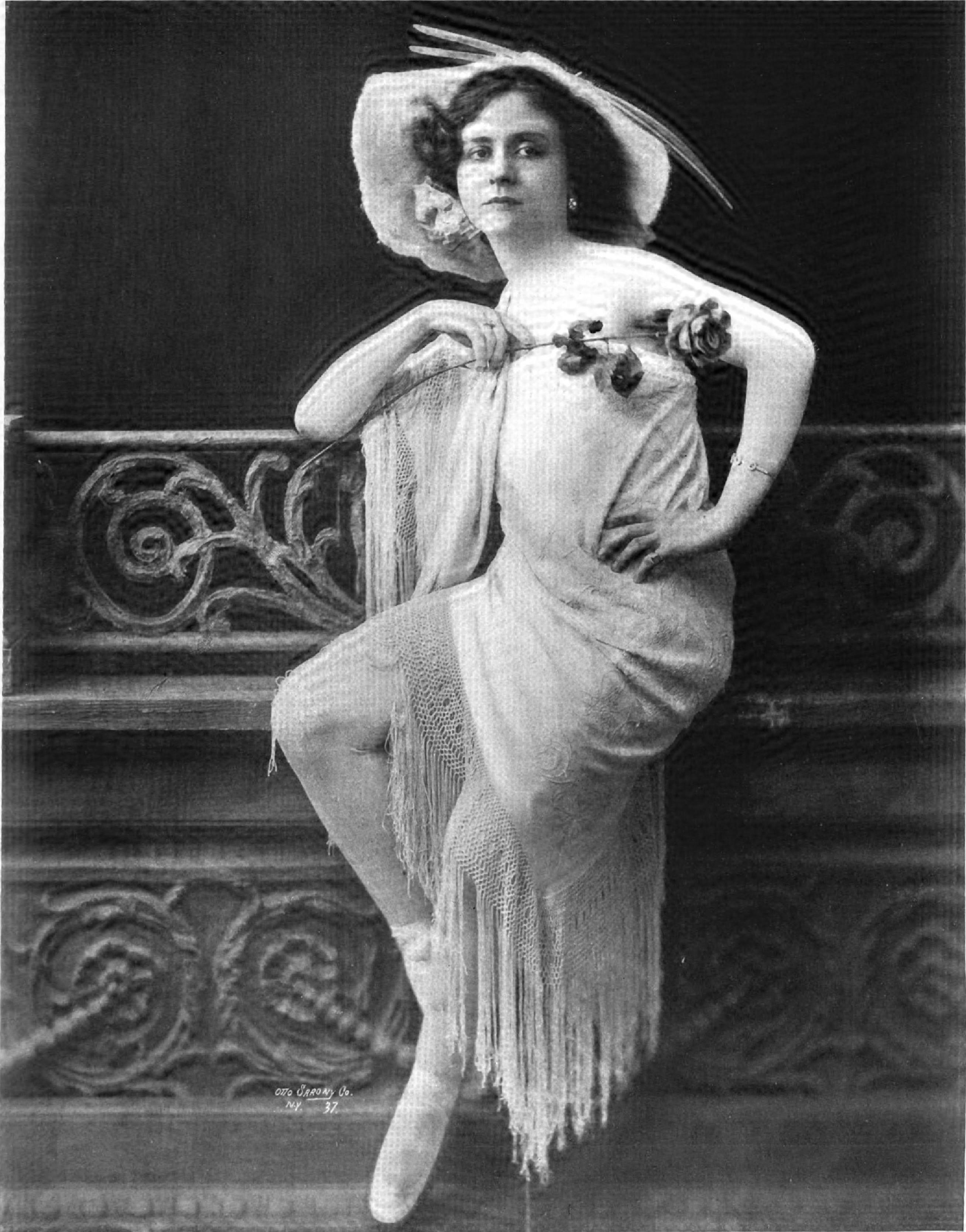
Mlle. Dazie, aged 24, on October 3, 1908, in a New York Star photograph by Otto Sarony

Daisy Ann Peterkin (September 16, 1884 – August 12, 1952), known by the stage name Mlle. Dazie, was an American vaudeville and Ziegfeld Follies dancer at the turn of the 20th century. She was a toe-dancer.

== Biography ==
Born on September 16, 1884, in St. Louis, Dazie's first appearance in vaudeville was as "Le Domino Rouge" in an act where she wore a red mask. After she got rid of the mask, she was billed as "Mlle. Dazie" and it was under this name that she appeared in the Ziegfeld Follies. She toured the B. F. Keith Circuit in a ballet pantomime, L'Amour d'Artiste, and headlined the Palace in 1917 in another ballet pantomime directed by Herbert Brenon. She headlined The Garden of Punchinello ballet directed by Herbert Brenon at the Palace. She also appeared in La Belle Paree. Her last stage performance was in Aphrodite, in 1919.

She married Cornelius Fellowes, president of the St. Nicholas Hygeia Ice Company and son of a famous horseman. A prize-winning racehorse (a thoroughbred mare) named after her has lineage including several successful racehorses.

She died on August 12, 1952, in Miami Beach, aged 67.

== Legacy ==
Gladys Brockwell played Mlle. Dazie in the silent film Spangles, 1926.

== Broadway ==
- The Belle of New York, January 22, 1900
- Ziegfeld Follies of 1907, July 8, 1907
- Ziegfeld Follies of 1908, June 15, 1908
- La Belle Paree / Bow-Sing / Tortajada, March 20, 1911
- La Belle Paree, September 11, 1911
- The Merry Countess, August 20, 1912
- Maid in America, February 18, 1915
- Aphrodite, November 24, 1919

== Films ==
- The Black Panther's Cub, 1921
