= Gladys Feldman =

American actress, dancer, and showgirl

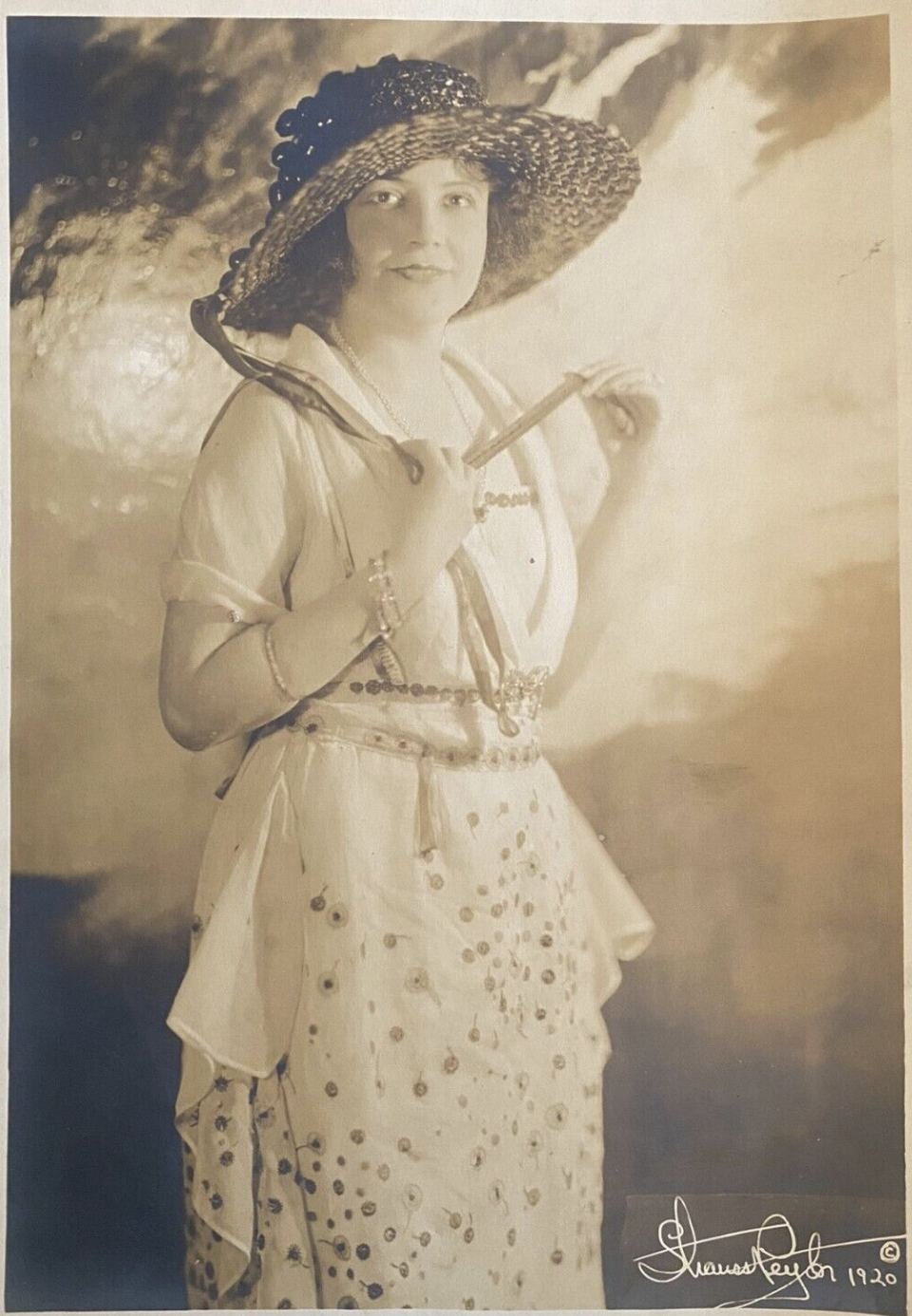
- Feldman, c. 1920
- Born: Gladys E. Feldman; September 28, 1891; Chicago, IL
- Died: February 12, 1974 (aged 83); Manhattan, NY, U.S.
- Occupations: Actress; Singer; Dancer
- Spouses: Frederick J. Hamill, October 22, 1907-?; Horace Braham, July 27, 1927- September 7, 1955 (death)

Gladys Feldman (born Gladys E. Feldman) was an American actress, dancer, and showgirl.

== Early years ==
Feldman was born on September 28, 1891, in Chicago to Joseph Feldman and his wife, Mattie (Beabers or Beavers) Feldman.

== Stage and film career ==
On July 3, 1909, Feldman was billed as "the most beautiful woman in the world" as part of Fred J. Hamill's "Bathing Girls" revue playing in Atlantic City, NJ. She and Mr. Hamill were billed on Broadway at the American Music Hall in September 1909 and at the Grand Opera House in October 1909.

Feldman appeared in the 1910 Broadway show The Girl and the Kaiser, which led to her working as a chorus girl in La Belle Paree (1911) and Tortajada (1911). In 1912, Feldman was described as "ragging it" to the song Everybody's Doing It at Manhattan's Cafe Martin while working as a showgirl with the noted comedy team of Weber and Fields. After appearing in a named role in High Jinks (1913–14), she had breakthrough success when cast as a principal in Ziegfeld Follies of 1914 as "The Spirit of the Tango."

“I got into the Follies because that dear Flo Ziegfeld happened to see me when I was having lunch at the Hotel Claridge," Feldman recalled some years later. "He sent word to my table that he would like to see me in his office the next day, I went and he offered me $50 or $60 a week. I told him I would have to have $100. He seemed amazed, but he paid me."

She had a comparatively long run as a Ziegfeld girl, appearing in Ziegfeld Follies of 1915, Ziegfeld Midnight Frolic 1915, Ziegfeld Follies of 1916 and Ziegfeld Follies of 1918. In 1919, she had a big role in The Gold Diggers (1919–1921) on Broadway. After many more shows, her last Broadway appearance was in Good Men and True (1935).

Feldman had a brief career in silent movies, appearing in the films Shams of Society (1921) and West of the Water Tower (1923).

== Later years ==
Feldman appeared on the radio periodically. She is noted as reprising her role in a radio version of the play Counsellor-at-Law with Paul Muni in 1935.

After her stage career ended, Feldman's major activity was serving as president of the Ziegfeld Club, an organization of alumnae of Ziegfeld musical shows from 1939 to 1965. “The Ziegfeld Club tries to help young actresses who are seeking success in the theater,” Feldman said in 1964. “Many of the Follies girls married well and are living in luxury, but many others need all the help that we can give. Some of Flo’s pets of other years would be lying in graves in Potter’s Field except for the efforts of the Ziegfeld Club."

== Personal life ==
In 1907, Feldman married Fred J. Hamill, who brought her into show business as part of his "Bathing Girls" revue. Although the record lists her as 21 years old, she would have just turned 16. Hamill was 38 years old. Hamill and Feldman are not mentioned in the press as a couple after 1909.

In 1918, Feldman, along with actresses Marjorie Rambeau and Gaby Deslys, was reportedly duped by a conman posing as "Marquis Edmond Rousselot de Castillo” of the French diplomatic service. Police referred to the bogus nobleman as "a devil with the ladies," with photographs of women “in loving attitudes," including one of Feldman, in his possession.

Feldman married fellow actor Horace Braham in 1927; the couple remained married until his death in 1955.

== Death ==
Feldman died in New York City on February 12, 1974.
