= Art Fowler (actor) =

Early 20th-century American actor, singer, and musician

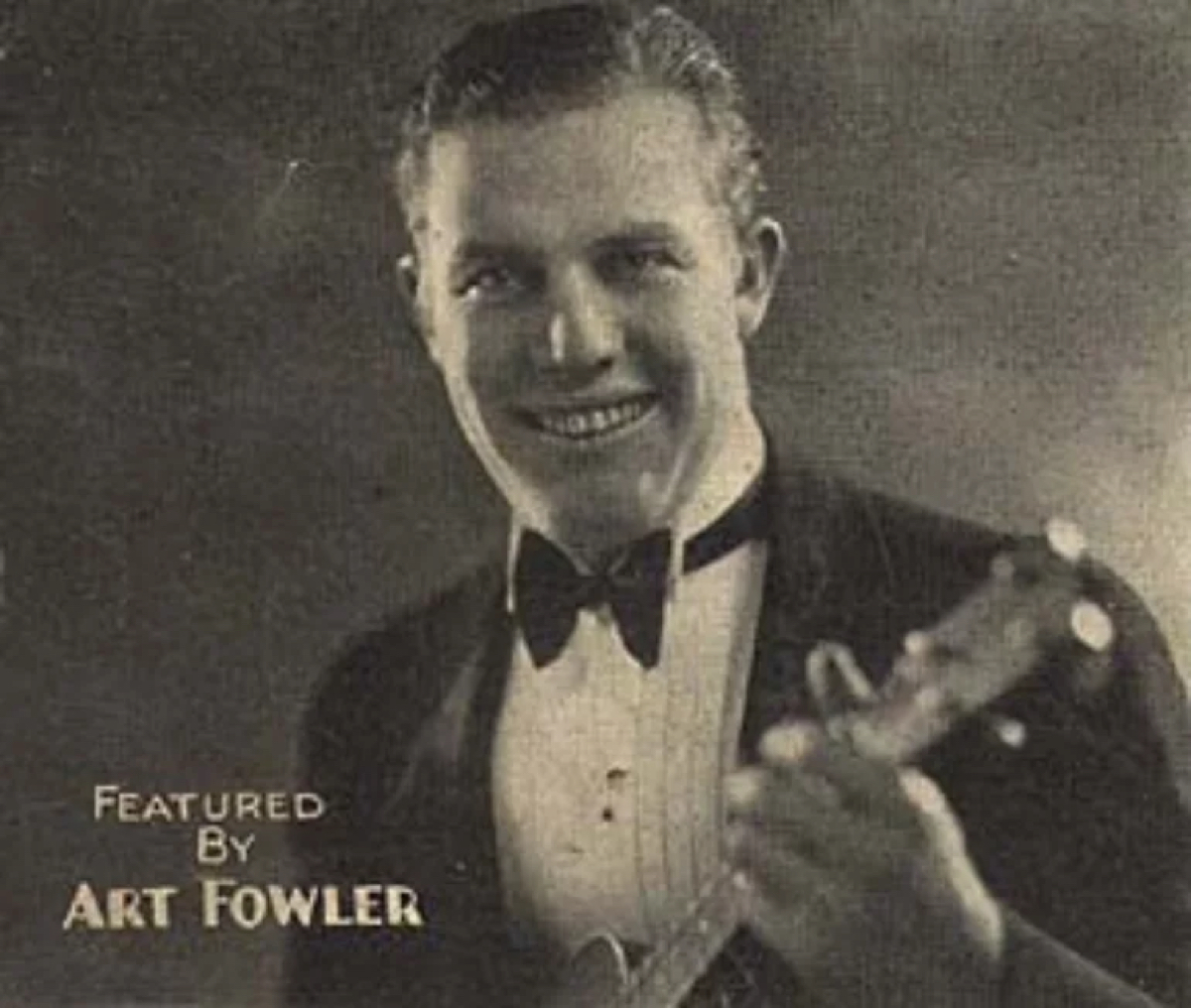
- Art Fowler, ca. 1925
- Born: Arthur Gladstone Fowler; 1902; Harrah, Oklahoma, U.S.
- Died: April 1953 (aged 50–51); Hollywood, California, U.S.
- Occupations: Actor; Musician; Singer
- Years active: 1915–1946
- Spouse(s): Emma Haig, February 5, 1928-death

Arthur Gladstone "Dustbowl" Fowler (1902 – April 1953) was an American actor and musician.

== Career ==
Foweler was known as "The Wizard of the Ukulele." He played tenor ukulele accompanied by a gentle croon. Among his hits are No Wonder She's a Blushing Bride, "Crazy Words, Crazy Tune" and "Just a Bird's Eye View of My Old Kentucky Home".

Fowler took up ukulele around 1922, playing professionally from 1925 with his first professional performance at the Metropolitan Picture House in Los Angeles. He went on to tour internationally and in 1927 he traveled to England for a series of performances after being discovered by Gerald Samson while performing in New York City.

Fowler appeared in a number of films, including

- Tonto Basin Outlaws (1941)
- Arizona Trail (1943)
- West of Texas (1943)
- Black Market Rustlers (1943)
- Law Men (1944)
- West of the Rio Grande (1944)
- Range Law (1944)

== Personal life ==
Fowler married actress and dancer Emma Haig in 1928 at the Savoy Chapel in London, England.

He and Haig reportedly ran antique shops in Newport, RI and Manhattan after she left the stage in 1931.
