= La Belle Paree =

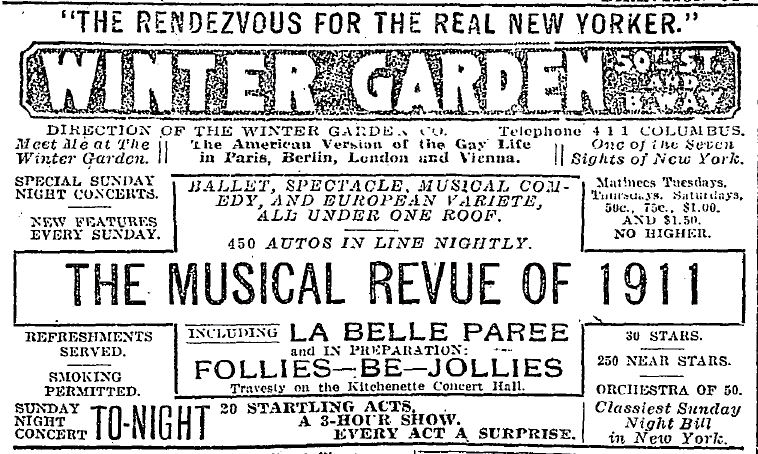
- Newspaper ad for the show
- Music: Jerome Kern and Frank Tours
- Lyrics: Edward Madden
- Book: Edgar Smith
- Setting: Contemporary Paris
- Premiere: 20 March 1911: Winter Garden Theatre, New York
- Productions: 96

La Belle Paree was a musical revue that launched the legitimate theatre career of Al Jolson. The book was by Edgar Smith, music by Jerome Kern and Frank Tours and lyrics by Edward Madden. Billee Taylor provided additional music and lyrics, and M. E. Rourke and Frederick Day provided additional lyrics. It premiered on Broadway in 1911. The musical is set in Paris, France.

== Production ==
La Belle Paree was staged between 20 March 1911 and 10 June 1911 at the Winter Garden Theatre in New York, running for 104 performances. At first it was staged along with various companion pieces, including an overture, a one-act opera set in China, called Bow-Sing, an exotic dance sequence called Tortajada and Her Sixteen Moorish Dancing Girls in a Spanish Ballet, and an afterpiece. After opening night, the show was trimmed and reorganized, and the companion pieces were soon dropped. The show was produced by Lee Shubert and Jacob J. Shubert, staged by J. C. Huffman and William J. Wilson, and choreographed by Wilson. The production was briefly revived in September of the same year and then toured from September to November.

== Show ==
The Shubert Brothers engaged Al Jolson for his first Broadway appearance in La Belle Paree, which was the first show to play at their new Winter Garden Theatre. The piece concerned Bridgeeta McShane, a wealthy American widow visiting Paris for her health, who meets a number of suitors and eccentric characters, including Erastus Sparkler, played by Jolson. Jolson soon converted this supporting role into a star vehicle, and he would make a dozen further Broadway appearances (often at the Winter Garden) in his varied career.

The first performance was overlong and dragged in places, continuing until almost 1:00 am, and some of the audience left before the end. The reviews were mixed, and Jolson was disappointed with his own performance. Jolson was scheduled late in the program, as La Belle Paris followed most of the companion pieces. Jolson played a phony "colored aristocrat", the boyfriend of Bridgeeta's Black maid, played by Mayhew. He wore blackface, and together they sang Jerome Kern's coon song Paris is a Paradise for Coons, about the freedoms African-Americans supposedly enjoyed living in Paris rather than in "Yankee Land". They also sang another song together, Jolson gave a monologue and sang a third song during the evening. Many of the critics had already left before Jolson came on, to make their publication deadlines, but the critics that mentioned Jolson and Mayhew, including The New York Times, praised them.

During the second performance, Jolson interrupted the performance to talk to the audience about the poor reviews, and then asked them if they would rather hear him sing. When they agreed, Jolson launched into a series of his own numbers. This time the reviews were very positive, and the show played for the rest of the season to solid audiences.

== Full cast ==
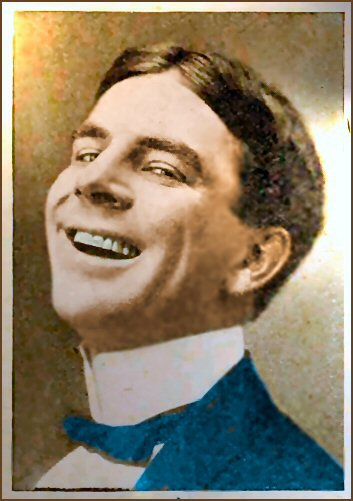
Edgar Atchison-Ely in "The Future Dude", c. 1898

Featured players were:

- Al Jolson as Erastus Sparkler
- Arthur Cunningham as Bridgeeta McShane
- Barney Bernard as Isadore Cohen
- Bessie Frewen as Margot
- Dorothy Jardon as La Duchesse
- Edgar Atchison-Ely as Henri Dauber
- Florence Tempest as Toots Horner
- Gladys Feldman Chorus
- Grace Van Studdiford as Mimi
- Grace Washburn as Marcelle
- Harold A. Robe as The Marquis de Champignon
- Harry Fisher as George Ramsbotham
- Hess Sisters as Russian Dancers
- Ida Kramer as A Grisette
- Jean Aylwin as Madame Clarice
- Katherine McDonald as Fifine
- Kitty Gordon as Lady Guff Jordon
- Lee Harrison as Ike Skinheimer
- Lew Quinn as A Cook Guide
- Marion Sunshine as Susie Jenkins
- May Allen as Juliette
- Milberry Rider as A Cocher
- Mitzi Hajos as Fifi Montmartre
- Mlle. Dazie as La Sylphide
- Paul Nicholson as Jack Ralston
- Ray Cox as Susan Brown
- Ray Dodge as Buck Lyons
- Stella Mayhew as Eczema Johnson
- Sylvia Clark as A Flower Girl
- Violet Bowers as Fifine
- Yvette as A Violinist
