= Louise Stichel =

French dancer and ballet master

Louise Jeanne Judith Stichel (née Luigia Giovanna Giuditta Manzini, called Madame Stichel) was a French dancer and ballet master born in Milan 20 July 1856 and died after 1933.

She has long been erroneously named Thérèse Stichel by confusion with her most famous ballet, La Fête chez Thérèse.

== Bibliography ==
- Alfred Auguste Baron, Les Petites coulisses de l’Opéra, Paris, A. Delmare, 1913.
- Lynn Garafola, Legacies of twentieth-century dance, Middletown, Connecticut, Wesleyan University Press, 2005.
- Carole Giorgis, Spectacles & spectateurs à Nice dans l'entre-deux guerres. Étude de la danse théâtrale dans les manifestations artistiques et mondaines, mémoire de maîtrise d'histoire sous la direction de Paul Gonnet, Université de Nice, 1988-1989.
- Hélène Marquié, « Enquête en cours sur Madame Stichel (1856 - ap. 1933) », Recherches en danse (read online).
- Hélène Marquié, « Entrez dans la danse, créez de la danse ! Maîtresses de ballet à la Belle Époque », in La Belle Époque des femmes, 1889-1914, textes réunis par François Le Guennec et Nicolas-Henri Zmelty, Paris, L'Harmattan, 2013, pp. 75–88.
- Édouard Noël et Edmond Stoullig, Les Annales du théâtre et de la musique 1886, Paris, Charpentier et Cie, 1887.

Preceded by Léo Staats	Director of the Paris Opera Ballet; 1909–1910	Succeeded by Ivan Clustine
