= Vera Maxwell (actress) =

American actress, dancer, choreographer, and showgirl (1891–1950)

Vera K. Maxwell
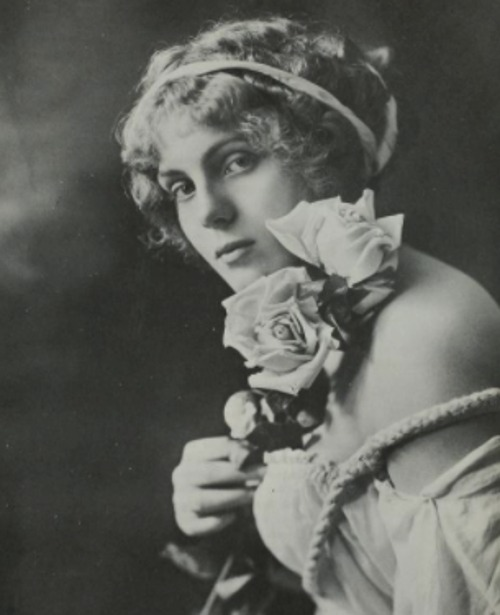
- Maxwell about 1917
- Born: Vera K. Maxwell; October 19, 1891; New York City, U.S.
- Died: May 1, 1950 (aged 58); New York City, U.S.
- Occupations: Actress; showgirl
- Years active: 1909–1928

Vera K. Maxwell (October 19, 1891 – May 1, 1950) was an American actress, dancer, choreographer, and showgirl.

== Early years ==
Maxwell was born in 1891 in New York City. The 1905 New York Census has her living in a Manhattan rooming house with her mother, also named Vera Maxwell, who is listed as a widow working as a milliner.

== Stage and screen career ==
Maxwell's first performance credit was as "Blondy, Third Bell Boy" in the Broadway musical comedy Mr. Hamlet of Broadway from December 1908 to February 1909. She was next cast in the Ziegfeld Follies of 1909 as a showgirl, where she achieved great success. She also seemed to have great fun, as she reportedly "danced the Fandango Rag" for the Follies company on a dining table during a 1910 New Year's Eve party.

Maxwell was in the Ziegfeld Follies of 1910 and the Ziegfeld Follies of 1911 when she became principal in the production. She returned for the Ziegfeld Follies of 1912, and the following year went to London to perform in All the Winners at London's Empire Theatre. By that point, she was famous for her theatrical talent; London papers described her as "a dancer and singer of considerable repute in New York." After reportedly "taking London by storm," Maxwell made a short film in England titled Always Gay where she danced "The Evening News Waltz" with Jack Jarrett.

Also in 1913, Maxwell reportedly had her portrait painted by Paul Helleu, who declared that Maxwell was "one of two the most beautiful women in America." Around the same time, Maxwell was voted "the most beautiful woman on stage" in Paris.

Maxwell was back in New York City by late 1913, where she performed at Hammerstein's with dance partner Wallace McCutcheon.

She made headlines early in 1914 when she was reported to "make $1,000 a week tangoing" and had "insured each of her slim and lithesome feet for $50,000 each."

Her next Broadway show was The Century Girl (1916–17), where she again danced with Wallace McCutcheon. She then appeared in Dance and Grow Thin (1917) and Miss 1917 (1917-1918). Her late career credits include The Tantrum in 1924 and Triple Crossed at the Morosco Theatre in 1927.

== Personal life ==
The Ziegfeld organization announced that Maxwell was engaged to businessman George H. Taylor in December 1912, but the marriage never took place. Maxwell remained single for the rest of her life.

Maxwell died in New York City in 1950.
