= Marion Sunshine =

American actress and songwriter (1894–1963)

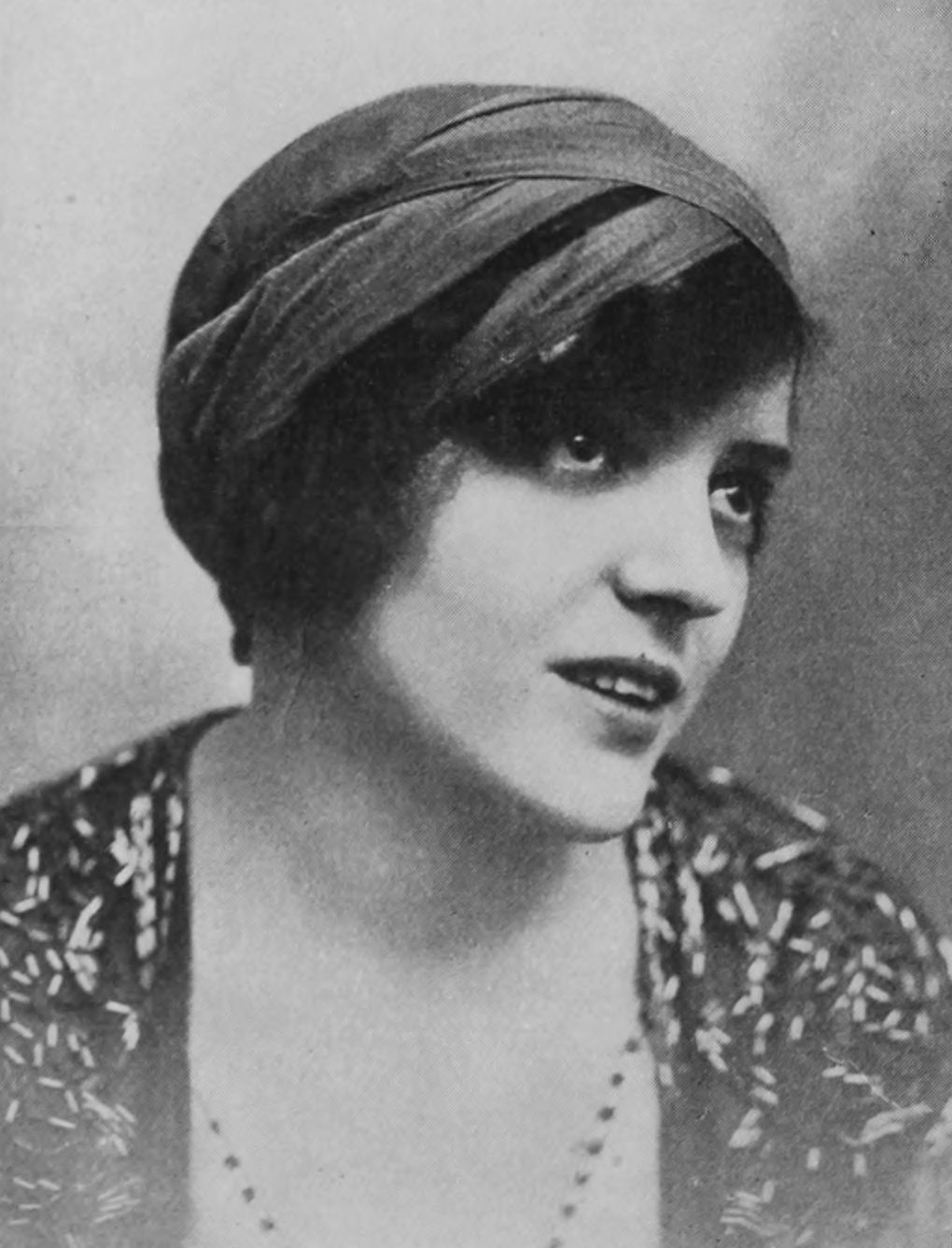
- Sunshine in 1916
- Born: Mary Tunstall Ijames; May 15, 1894; Louisville, Kentucky, US
- Died: January 25, 1963 (aged 68); New York City, US
- Occupations: Actress, songwriter
- Years active: 1908–1916
- Spouse: Eusebio Santiago Azpiazú (December 5, 1930 – January 25, 1963 (her death))

Marion Sunshine (born Mary Tunstall Ijames; May 15, 1894 – January 25, 1963) was an American actress and songwriter. During her youth she worked in many films and Broadway musicals, as well as vaudeville and variety shows. In the 1930s she was involved in the so-called "rhumba craze" and translated the lyrics of many Latin music songs.

== Life and career ==
Sunshine was born in Louisville, Kentucky on May 15, 1894. After moving to New York City at a young age, she sang in Broadway musicals such as Going Up. Between 1908 and 1916 she appeared on 26 films. In many of her performances she appeared with her sister Florence Tempest.

Sunshine also worked as a vaudeville performer, and as a songwriter for Edward B. Marks. In 1922, while working in the Ziegfeld Follies, she became romantically involved with Cuban businessman Eusebio Azpiazú, known in the Latin music scene as Don Antobal. His brother Justo Ángel Azpiazú, better known as Don Azpiazú, was a prominent band leader in Havana. The 1930 rendition of "The Peanut Vendor" recorded by his Havana Casino Orchestra featuring Antonio Machín on vocals became the first million-selling single in the history of Latin music. Sunshine translated the lyrics into English, as she would later do with other rhumba hits such as "Mango Mangüé". In December 1930, she married Don Antobal, and continued her involvement in the rhumba scene, which earned her the nickname "The Rumba Lady". Besides, she wrote several jazz standards such as "When I Get Low, I Get High," recorded by Ella Fitzgerald with Chick Webb in 1936.

Sunshine died in New York City on January 25, 1963, aged 68 years.

== Selected filmography ==
- The Red Girl (1908)
- Mr. Jones at the Ball (1908)
- Her Awakening (1911)
