= Ziegfeld Follies =

Elaborate New York theatrical revues (1907–1957)

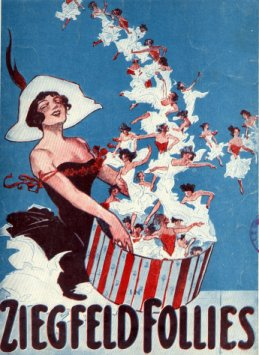
Promotional artwork for 1912 Ziegfeld Follies

The Ziegfeld Follies were a series of elaborate theatrical revue productions on Broadway in New York City from 1907 to 1931, with revivals in 1934, 1936, 1943, and 1957. These shows included a wide variety of performances, including dance sequences, musical numbers, comedy sketches and specialty acts. The Follies had later versions as radio broadcasts in 1932 and 1936 titled The Ziegfeld Follies of the Air.

Inspired by the Folies Bergère of Paris, the Ziegfeld Follies were conceived and mounted by Florenz Ziegfeld Jr. Many of the top comedians, singers and other entertainers in America appeared in the shows. They were also known for displaying beautiful chorus girls, commonly called Ziegfeld Girls, dressed in elaborate costumes.

The biopic The Great Ziegfeld won the Oscar for Best Picture in 1937. A 1941 film, Ziegfeld Girl, starring Judy Garland, and another in 1946, Ziegfeld Follies, recreated or reimagined numbers from the revues. The stage musical Funny Girl, which premiered on Broadway in 1964 depicts Fanny Brice's career with the Follies, starring Barbra Streisand, who then starred in the 1968 film adaptation; it was the year's top-grossing movie.

== Founding and history ==
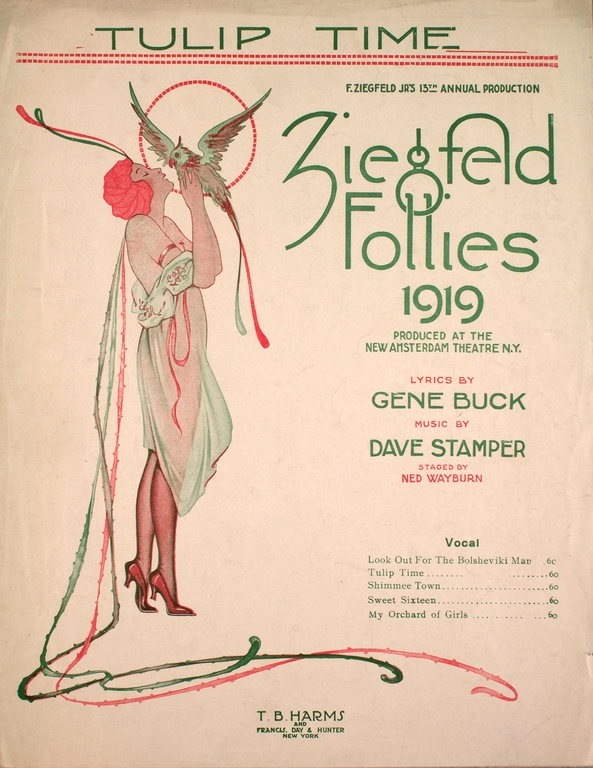
Sheet music for a song from the 1919 Ziegfeld Follies

Inspired by the Folies Bergère of Paris, the Ziegfeld Follies were conceived and mounted by Florenz Ziegfeld Jr., reportedly at the suggestion of his then-wife, the actress and singer Anna Held. The shows' producers were the powerful syndicate of Klaw and Erlanger.

The Follies were a series of lavish revues, something between later Broadway shows and the more elaborate high-class vaudeville and variety show. The first follies, The Follies of 1907, was produced that year at the Jardin de Paris roof theatre. The shows included a wide variety of performances, including dance sequences, musical numbers, comedy sketches and specialty acts.

During the Follies era, many of the top comedians, singers and other entertainers in America appeared in the shows, including W. C. Fields, Eddie Cantor, Josephine Baker, Fanny Brice, Ann Pennington, Bert Williams, Eva Tanguay, Bob Hope, Will Rogers, Ruth Etting, Ray Bolger, Helen Morgan, Louise Brooks, Marilyn Miller, Ed Wynn, Gilda Gray, Nora Bayes and Sophie Tucker.

One of the most common features of the Ziegfeld Follies was the "Ziegfeld Girls", chorus girls who "paraded up and down flights of stairs [costumed] as anything from birds to battleships". Their elaborate costumes were created by designers such as Erté, Lady Duff-Gordon and Ben Ali Haggin. The "tableaux vivants" used in the revues were designed by Ben Ali Haggin from 1917 to 1925. Joseph Urban was the scenic designer for the Follies shows, starting in 1915, and Edward Royce directed the Follies in 1920 and 1921, in addition to several other Ziegfeld productions.

The Ziegfeld Follies of 1919 opened amid the 1919 Actors’ Equity strike. Many of the Follies chorus girls joined the new Chorus Equity Association and the strike. Ziegfeld then obtained a court injunction against the Actors’ Equity union, which prompted five headliners to walk out on August 13, 1919, who Ziegfeld then sued. The audience was sent away with a refund, and the production reopened on September 10.

Following the 1929 Stock Market Crash, in which Ziegfeld lost more than a million dollars, Ziegfeld hosted his final show, The Ziegfeld Follies of 1931, which suffered from low audience turnout amid the Great Depression. In 1932, Ziegfeld died from pleurisy, leaving his wife in substantial debt. After his death, his widow, actress Billie Burke, authorized use of his name for Ziegfeld Follies in 1934 and 1936 to Jake Shubert, who then produced the Follies. The name was later used by other promoters in New York City, Philadelphia, and again on Broadway, with less connection to the original Follies, but their productions failed to attract the size of audiences of the earlier productions. When the show toured, the 1934 edition was recorded in its entirety, from the overture to play-out music, on a series of 78 rpm discs, which were edited by the record producer David Cunard to form an album of the highlights of the production and which was released as a CD in 1997.

== Productions based on the Ziegfeld Follies ==
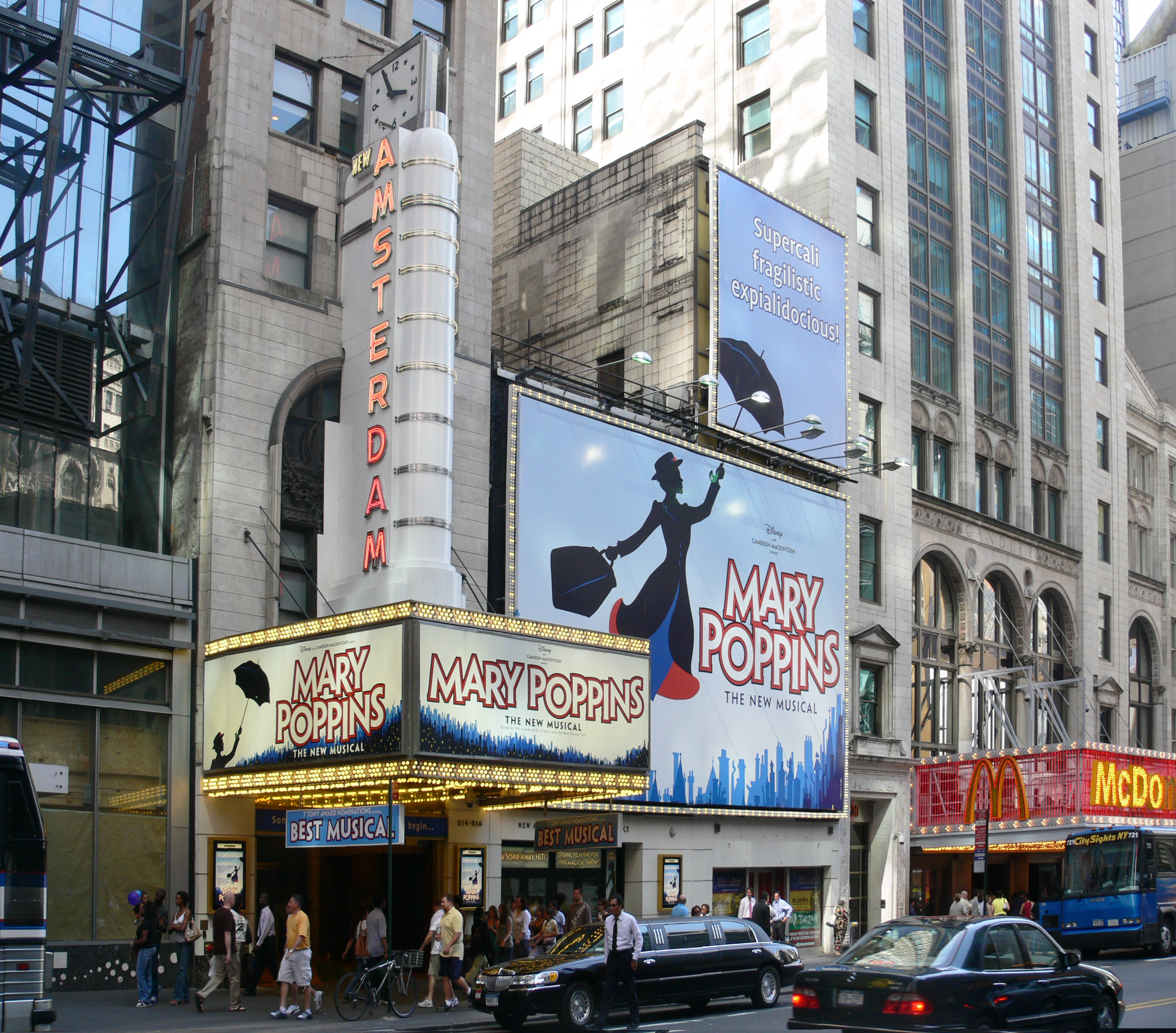
The New Amsterdam Theatre, New York

In 1937, at the 9th Academy Awards, the Metro-Goldwyn-Mayer (MGM) film The Great Ziegfeld won the Best Picture (then called "Outstanding Production"), starring William Powell as Florenz Ziegfeld, Jr. and co-starring Myrna Loy (as Ziegfeld's second wife Billie Burke), Luise Rainer (as Anna Held, which won her an Academy Award for Best Actress), and Frank Morgan as Jack Billings. Featuring numbers by Ray Bolger, Dennis Morgan, Virginia Bruce, and Harriet Hoctor, the film gave wider audiences a glimpse into the Follies; the show-stopper was the Irving Berlin-composed "A Pretty Girl Is Like a Melody", which, by itself, cost more to produce than one of Ziegfeld's entire stage shows.

In 1941, MGM released Ziegfeld Girl, starring Judy Garland, Lana Turner, Hedy Lamarr, James Stewart and Tony Martin. The film was set in the 1920s. Celebrated numbers from Ziegfeld Revues were recreated, including the famed "Wedding Cake" set which had been used for MGM's earlier film, The Great Ziegfeld. Judy Garland was filmed on top of the cake. Charles Winninger, who had performed in the Follies of 1920, appeared as "Ed Gallagher" with Gallagher's real-life partner Al Shean to recreate the duo's famous song "Mister Gallagher and Mister Shean". According to modern sources, Turner's character was modeled after Ziegfeld Girl Lillian Lorraine, who suffered a drunken fall into the orchestra pit during an extravagant number.

In 1946, MGM released a third feature film based on Ziegfeld's shows titled Ziegfeld Follies with Fred Astaire, Judy Garland, Lena Horne, William Powell (as Ziegfeld), Gene Kelly, Fanny Brice, Red Skelton, Esther Williams, Cyd Charisse, Lucille Ball, Kathryn Grayson, and others performing songs and sketches similar to those from the original Follies. In 1947, Ziegfeld Follies was awarded the "Grand Prix de la Comedie Musicale" at the Cannes Film Festival and received an Academy Award nomination for Best Art Direction-Set Decoration (black and white).

The stage musical Funny Girl, which premiered on Broadway in 1964, depicts Fanny Brice's success with the Follies. In 1964, the musical debuted on Broadway, with Barbra Streisand playing Brice, Roger DeKoven as Florenz Ziegfeld Jr. and Brice's son-in-law Ray Stark producing. The 1968 Columbia Pictures film adaptation featuring Streisand reprising her role as Brice and Walter Pidgeon as Ziegfeld was the year's top-grossing movie. A subsequent Broadway revival in 2022 and 2023 featured Beanie Feldstein and later Lea Michele as Brice, and Peter Francis James as Ziegfeld.

== The Follies ==
Shine On, Harvest Moon
One of the hits of the 1908 Follies, created by husband-and-wife team (and Ziegfeld performers) Jack Norworth and Nora Bayes. This recording was made a year later by Ada Jones and Billy Murray.

- Follies of 1907, 1908, 1909, 1910 at the Jardin de Paris
- Ziegfeld Follies of 1911 at the Jardin de Paris
- Ziegfeld Follies of 1912 at the Moulin Rouge
- Ziegfeld Follies of 1913, 1914, 1915, 1916, 1917, 1918, 1919, 1920 at the New Amsterdam Theatre
- Ziegfeld Follies of 1921 at the Globe Theatre
- Ziegfeld Follies of 1922, 1923, 1924, 1925, 1927 at the New Amsterdam Theatre
- Ziegfeld Follies of 1931 at the Ziegfeld Theatre
- Ziegfeld Follies of 1934 at the Winter Garden Theatre
- Ziegfeld Follies of 1936 at the Winter Garden Theatre
- Ziegfeld Follies of 1943

- Winter Garden Theatre (April 1, 1943 – January 25, 1944)
- Imperial Theatre (January 25 – July 22, 1944)

- Ziegfeld Follies of 1957 at the Winter Garden Theatre

== List of notable performers by year ==
1907

- Louise Alexander
- Nora Bayes (joined the cast later in run)
- Helen Broderick
- Emma Carus
- Mlle. Dazie
- Grace La Rue
- Lillian Lee
- Edna Luby
- Charles J. Ross
- Marion Sunshine
- Florence Tempest
- Harry Watson Jr.

1908

- Nora Bayes
- Marjorie Bonner
- Mlle. Dazie
- Grace La Rue
- Harry Watson Jr.
- The Ziegfeld Girls (including Mae Murray)

1909

- Nora Bayes
- Bessie Clayton
- Maurice Hegeman
- Jack Norworth
- Lillian Lorraine
- Sophie Tucker
- Vera Maxwell
- The Ziegfeld Girls

1910

- Fanny Brice
- Maurice Hegeman
- Anna Held (in a filmed sequence)
- Lillian Lorraine
- Bobby North
- Bert Williams
- Vera Maxwell
- The Ziegfeld Girls

1911

- Fanny Brice
- The Dolly Sisters
- Leon Errol
- Lillian Lorraine
- Vera Maxwell
- Bessie McCoy
- Bert Williams
- The Ziegfeld Girls (including Jeanne Eagels)

1912

- Leon Errol
- Bernard Granville
- Lillian Lorraine
- Josie Sadler
- Rae Samuels
- Harry Watson Jr.
- Bert Williams
- Vera Maxwell
- The Ziegfeld Girls

1913

- Elizabeth Brice
- Leon Errol
- José Collins
- Ann Pennington
- Frank Tinney
- Nat M. Wills
- The Ziegfeld Girls

1914

- Leon Errol
- Gladys Feldman
- Annette Kellermann
- Vera Maxwell
- Vera Michelena
- Ann Pennington
- Bert Williams
- Ed Wynn
- The Ziegfeld Girls

1915

- Ina Claire
- Leon Errol
- Gladys Feldman
- W. C. Fields
- Bernard Granville
- Justine Johnstone
- Mae Murray
- Ann Pennington
- Ed Wynn
- Bert Williams
- The Ziegfeld Girls (including Helen Barnes, Marion Davies, Odette Myrtil and Olive Thomas)

1916

- Fanny Brice
- Ina Claire
- Gladys Feldman
- W. C. Fields
- Allyn King
- Bird Millman
- Ann Pennington
- Will Rogers
- Bert Williams
- Marion Davies
- Emma Haig
- Bernard Granville
- The Ziegfeld Girls (including Irene Hayes, Julanne Johnston and Lilyan Tashman)

1917

- Diana Allen
- Elvira Amazar
- Fanny Brice
- Eddie Cantor
- Dolores
- The Fairbanks Twins
- Allyn King
- William E. Ritchie
- Will Rogers
- Lilyan Tashman
- Bert Williams
- The Ziegfeld Girls (including Peggy Hopkins Joyce)

1918

- Eddie Cantor
- Madeline and Marion Fairbanks, The Fairbanks Twins
- Gladys Feldman
- W. C. Fields
- Joe Frisco
- Pauline Hall
- Kay Laurell
- Lillian Lorraine
- Allyn King
- Marilyn Miller
- Ann Pennington
- Bert Savoy
- The Ziegfeld Girls (including Doris Eaton, Martha Mansfield and Nita Naldi)

1919

- Eddie Cantor
- Johnny and Ray Dooley
- Eddie Dowling
- Madeline and Marion Fairbanks, The Fairbanks Twins
- Allyn King
- Marilyn Miller
- Van and Schenck
- John Steel
- Bert Williams
- The Ziegfeld Girls (including Billie Dove, Doris Eaton and Mary Hay)

1920

- Fanny Brice
- Eddie Cantor
- Jack Donahue
- Ray Dooley
- Mary Eaton
- W. C. Fields
- Bernard Granville
- Art Hickman's Orchestra
- Allyn King
- Moran and Mack
- Van and Schenck
- Charles Winninger
- The Ziegfeld Girls (including Juliette Compton, Doris Eaton and Dorothy Mackaill)

1921

- Fanny Brice
- Mary Eaton
- W. C. Fields
- Raymond Hitchcock
- Vera Michelena
- Van and Schenck
- The Ziegfeld Girls (including Anastasia Reilly and Mary Nolan)
- Germaine Mitti and Eugene Tillio

1922

- Mary Eaton
- Gallagher and Shean
- Alexander Gray
- Gilda Gray
- Nervo and Knox
- Olsen and Johnson
- Will Rogers
- Jack Whiting
- The Ziegfeld Girls (including Naomi Johnson, Geneva Mitchell, and Barbara Stanwyck)

1923

- Fanny Brice
- James J. Corbett
- Alexander Gray
- Ann Pennington
- Hap Ward
- Bert & Betty Wheeler
- Paul Whiteman
- The Ziegfeld Girls (including Lina Basquette, Dolores Costello, Hilda Ferguson, Naomi Johnson and Barbara Stanwyck)

1924–25

- Billie Burke
- Ray Dooley (joined the cast later in run)
- W. C. Fields (joined the cast later in run)
- Lupino Lane
- Ann Pennington
- Will Rogers
- Vivienne Segal
- Ethel Shutta
- Frank Tinney
- Dorothy Wegman
- Blanche Satchel
- Bertha Belmore
- The Ziegfeld Girls (including Louise Brooks, Claire Dodd, Peggy Fears, Naomi Johnson, and Dorothy Sebastian)

1927

- Eddie Cantor
- Cliff Edwards
- Ruth Etting
- Frances Upton
- Al Siegel
- The Brox Sisters
- Claire Luce
- Dorothy Wegman
- Norma Taylor
- The Ziegfeld Girls (including Lilian Bond and Paulette Goddard)

1931

- Faith Bacon
- Buck & Bubbles
- Dorothy Dell
- Ruth Etting
- Helen Morgan
- Hal Le Roy
- Mitzi Mayfair
- Ernest McChesney
- Jack Pearl
- Harry Richman
- The Ziegfeld Girls (including Iris Adrian, Virginia Biddle, Jean Howard, Mona Louise Parsons, and Zecil Silvonia)

1934

- Eve Arden
- Fanny Brice
- Robert Cummings
- Buddy and Vilma Ebsen
- Jane Froman
- Patricia Bowman
- Willie and Eugene Howard
- Everett Marshall
- June and Cherry Preisser
- The Ziegfeld Girls

1936

- Eve Arden
- Fanny Brice
- Josephine Baker
- Judy Canova
- Bobby Clark (replacement)
- Cass Daley (replacement)
- Harriet Hoctor
- Bob Hope
- Gypsy Rose Lee (replacement)
- The Nicholas Brothers
- Gertrude Niesen
- June and Cherry Preisser
- The Ziegfeld Girls (including Adele Jergens)

1943

- Bil Baird
- Cora Baird
- Milton Berle
- Eric Blore (replacement)
- Jack Carter (replacement)
- Jack Cole
- Ilona Massey
- Dean Murphy
- Arthur Treacher
- Tommy Wonder
- The Ziegfeld Girls

1956 (Boston)

- Bea Arthur
- Tallulah Bankhead
- Mae Barnes
- Joan Diener
- Carol Haney
- Larry Kert
- Matt Mattox
- Julie Newmar
- Elliott Reid
- The Ziegfeld Girls

1957

- Billy DeWolfe
- Harold Lang
- Carol Lawrence
- Beatrice Lillie
- Jane Morgan
- The Ziegfeld Girls

== Ziegfeld girls and other Ziegfeld performers ==
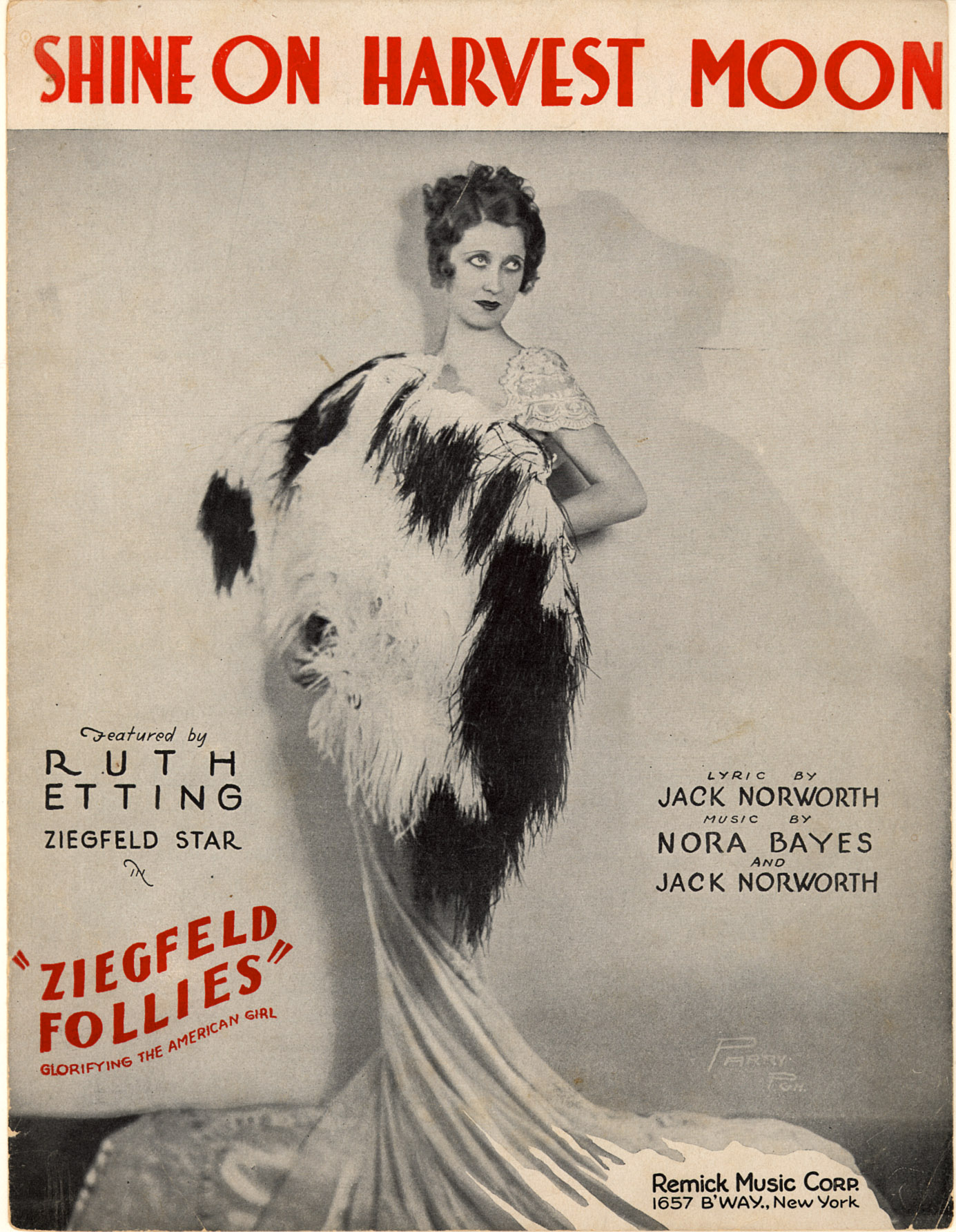
Ruth Etting of the Ziegfeld Follies

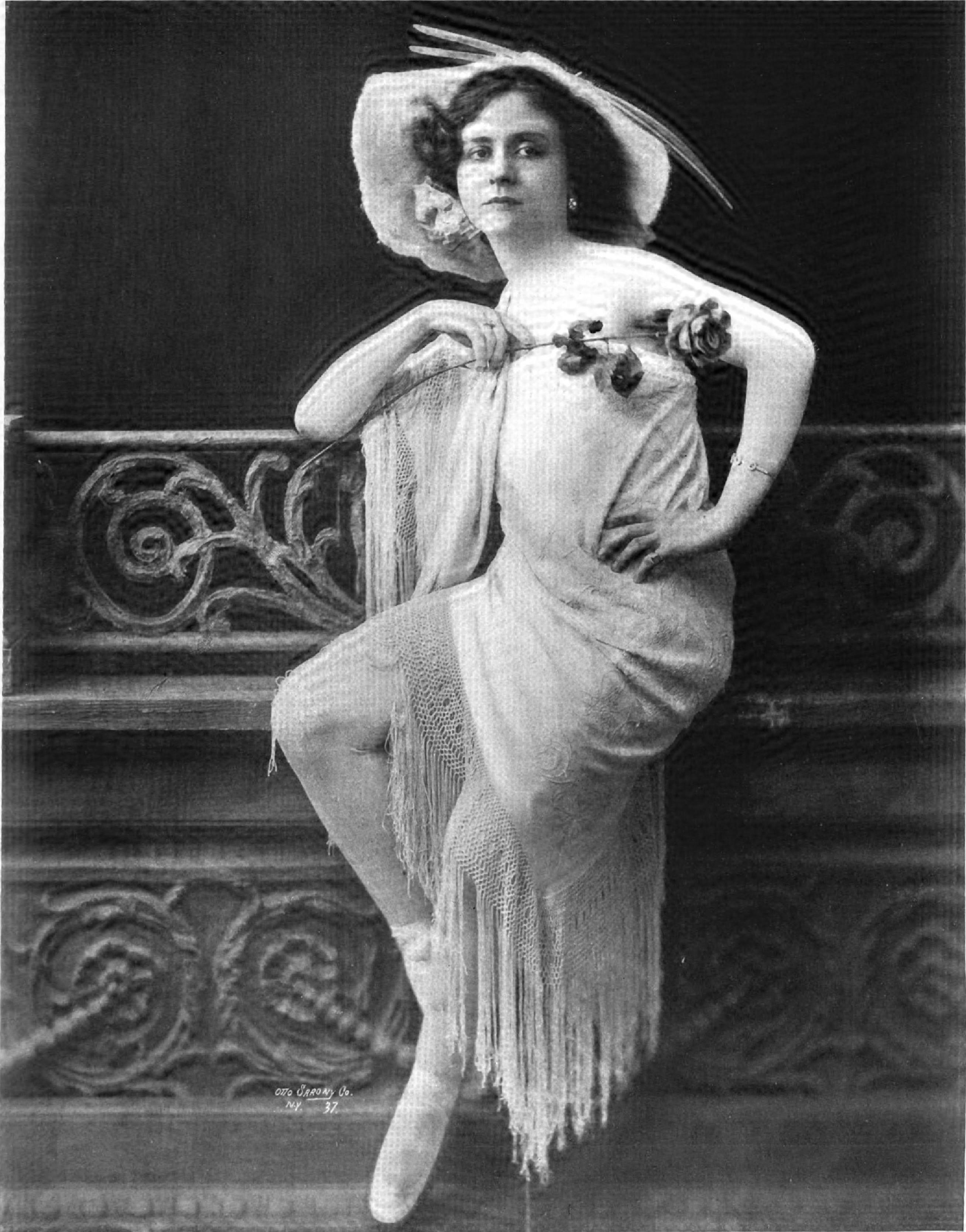
Mlle. Dazie, 1908

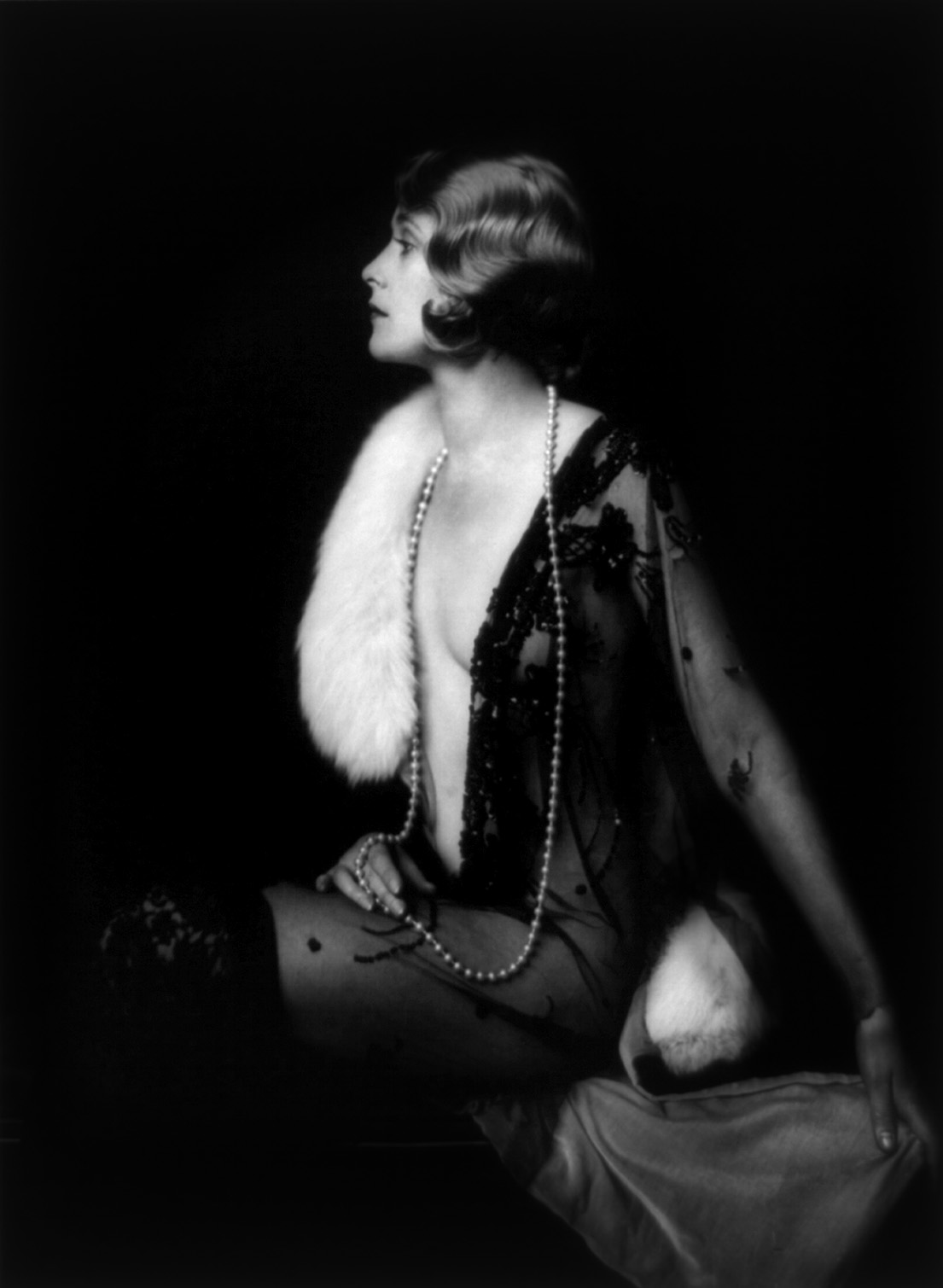
Muriel Finlay, Ziegfeld girl, by Alfred Cheney Johnston, c. 1928

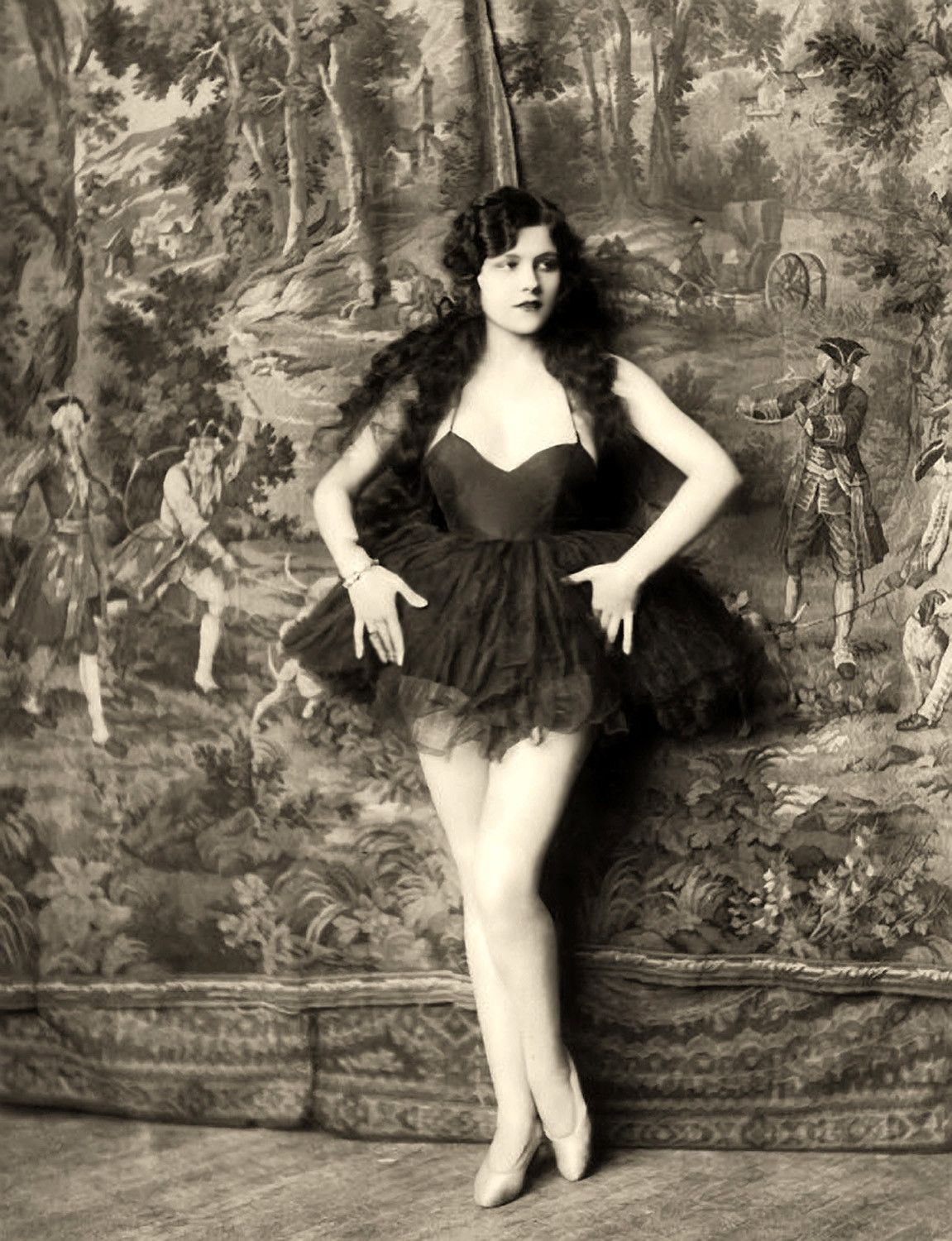
Naomi Johnson, Ziegfeld girl, by Alfred Cheney Johnston, c. 1920s

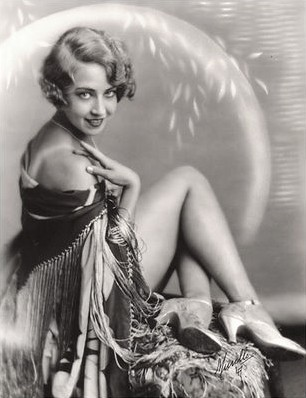
A photograph of Doris Eaton Travis (1904–2010), c. 1920, during the Ziegfeld Follies years.

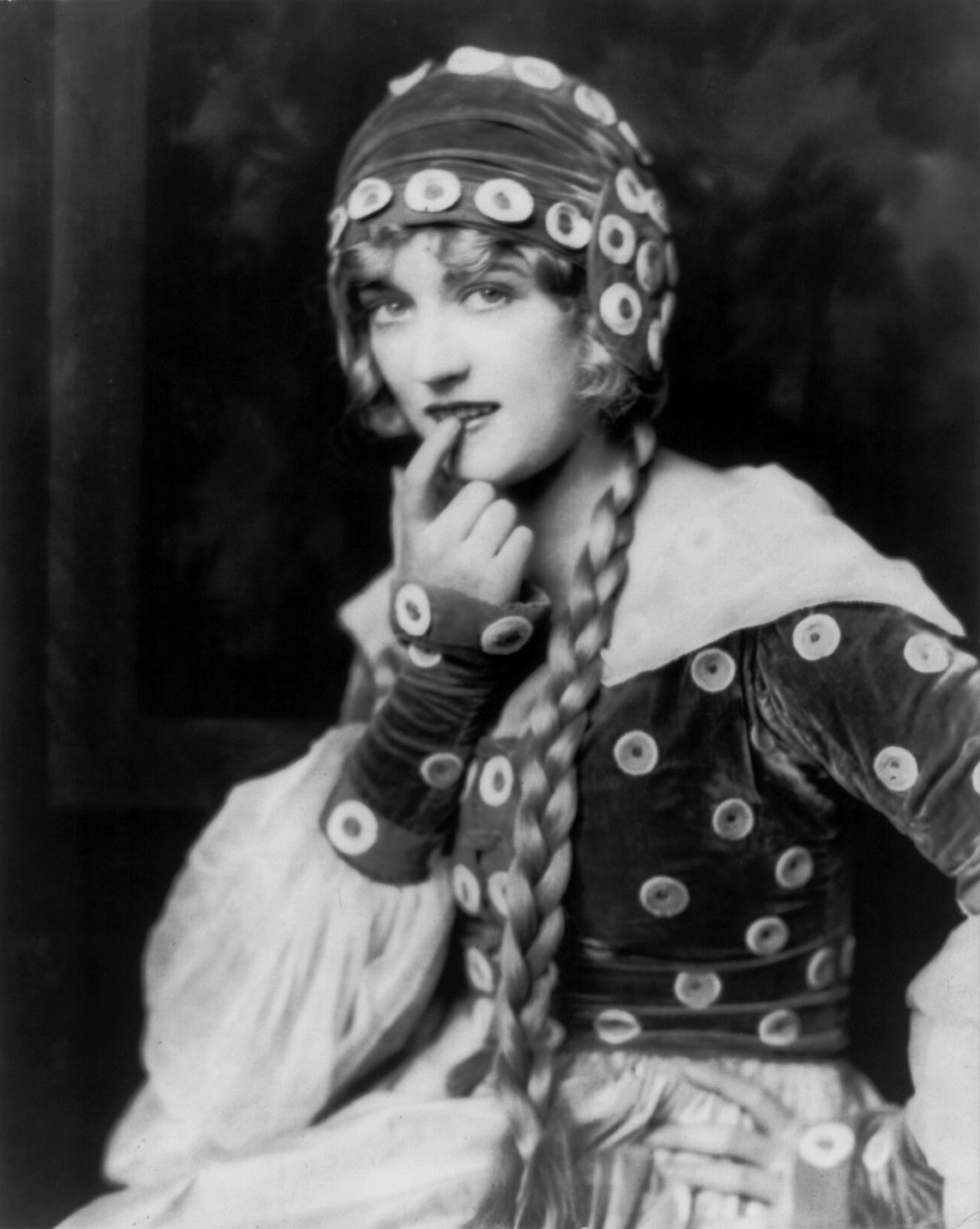
Marion Davies, Ziegfeld girl, by Alfred Cheney Johnston, c. 1916

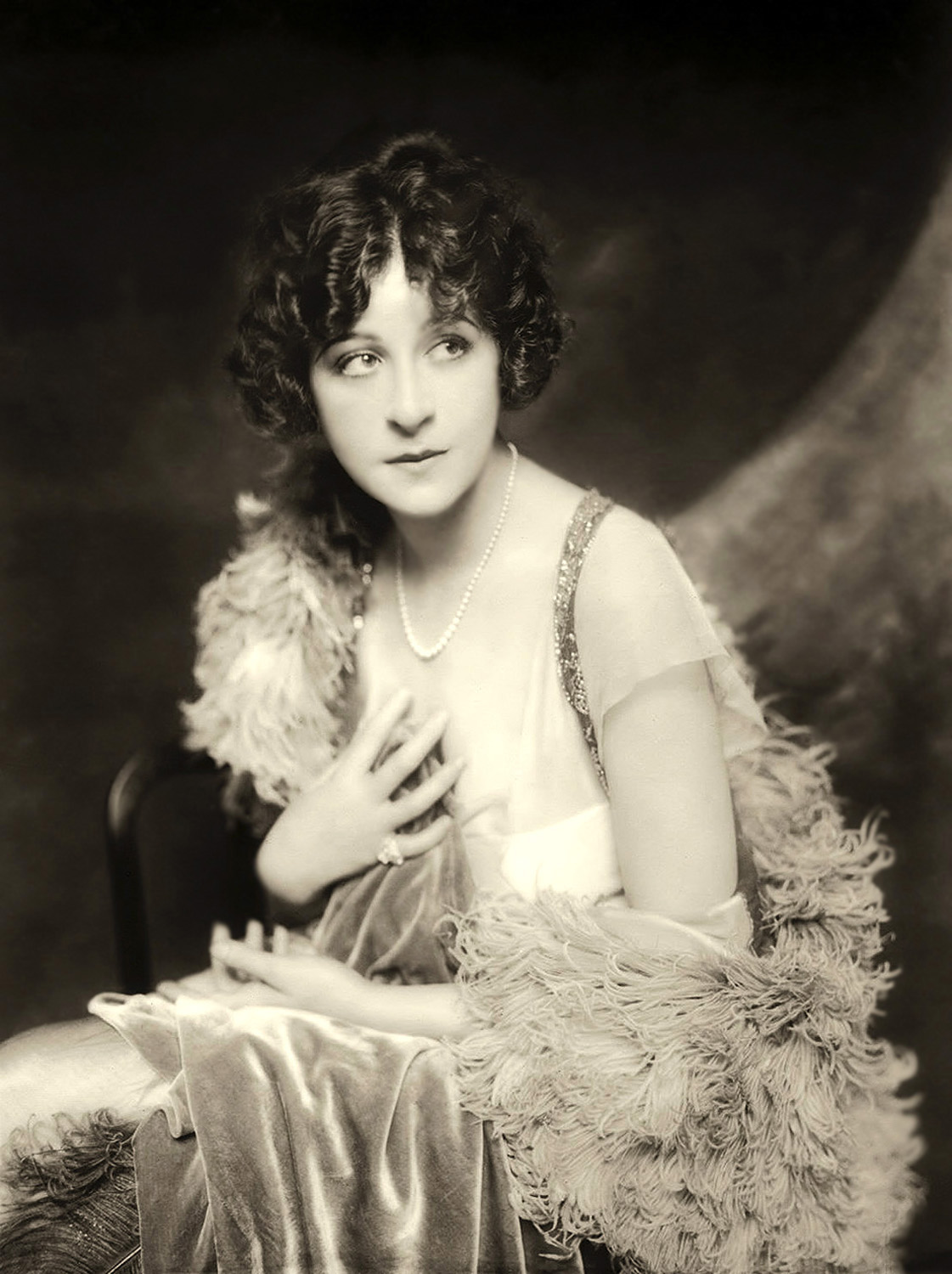
Fanny Brice, Ziegfeld Follies photo, 1910s or start of 1920s

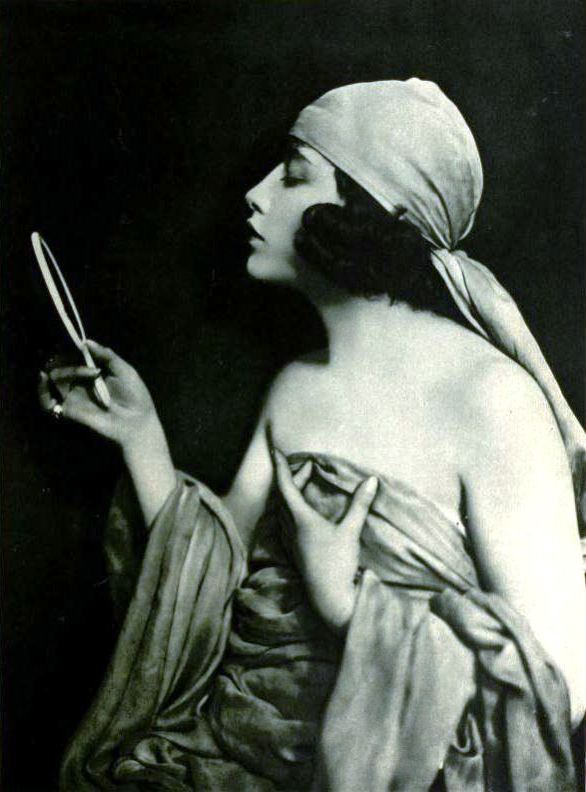
Shannon Day

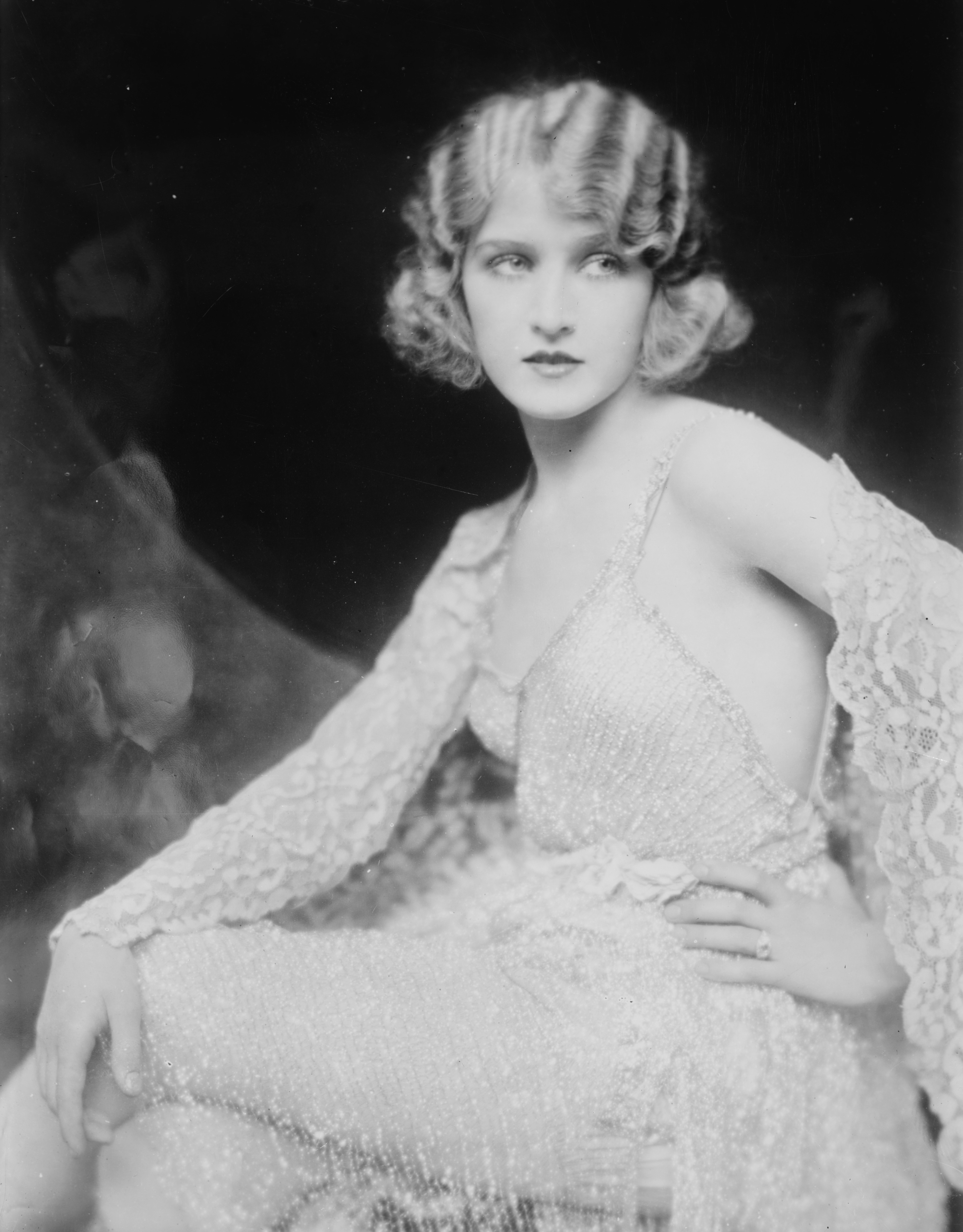
Mary Eaton

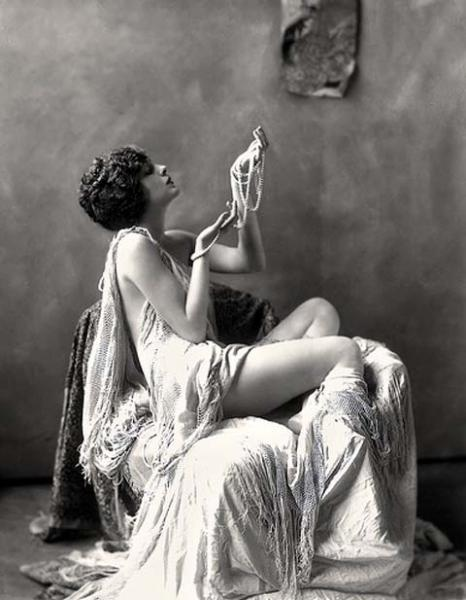
Lillian Bohny (Billie Dove), c. 1920

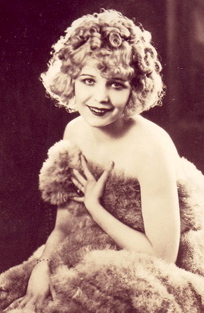
Dancer Bee Palmer in fur

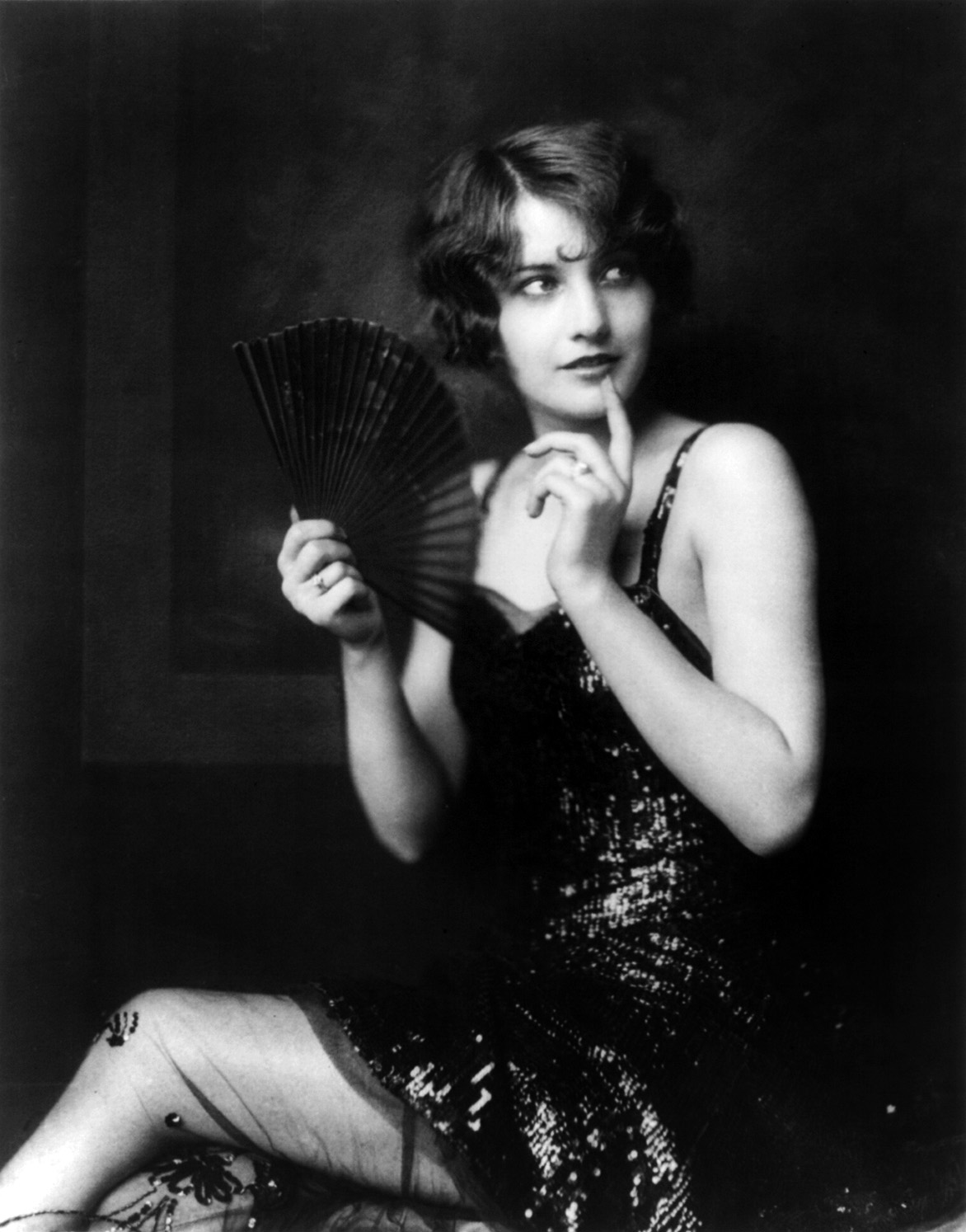
Ruby Stevens (Barbara Stanwyck), 1924

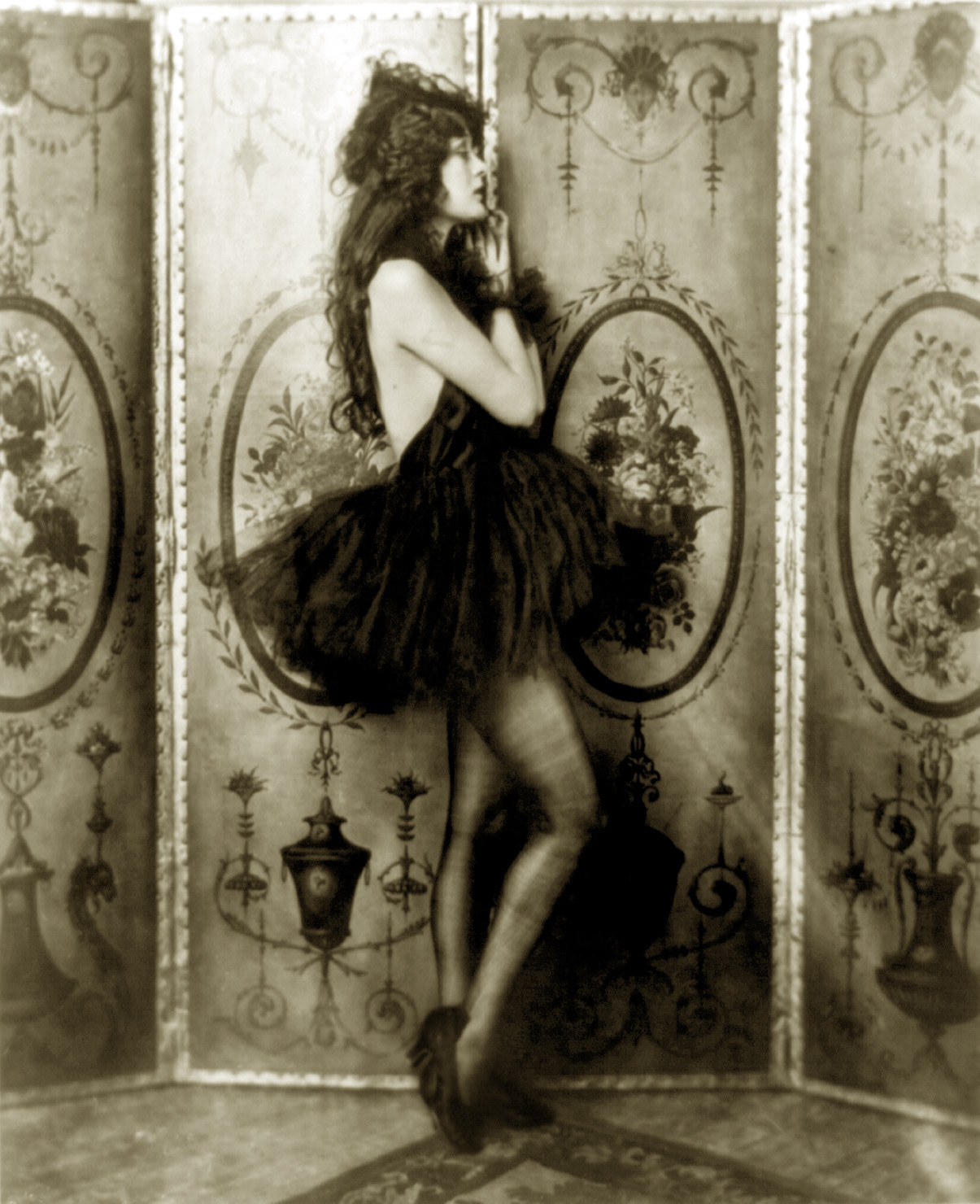
Dolores Costello, 1923

== Legacy ==
The 1971 Stephen Sondheim musical Follies takes place at a reunion of showgirls from the Weissman Follies, a fictional revue inspired by the Ziegfeld Follies. In addition to featuring "ghosts" of statuesque showgirls from the heyday of the revues, the musical includes many songs and production numbers that are intended to evoke the types of entertainment typically featured in the Ziegfeld Follies and other revues of the period. Examples include parade of showgirls ("Beautiful Girls"); a torch song ("Losing My Mind"); a baggy pants comic song ("The God-Why-Don't-You-Love-Me Blues"); and a novelty song ("Rain on the Roof"). In The Drowsy Chaperone, the character Victor Feldzieg is the producer of Feldzieg's Follies, a parody of Ziegfeld Follies.

The TV show Boardwalk Empire, about crime and corruption in 1920s Atlantic City, New Jersey, features a character that is a former Follies dancer, Lucy Danzige, portrayed by Paz de la Huerta.

The 1912 version of the Ziegfeld Follies included a song titled "Row, Row, Row", the tune of which has been adapted by football clubs in Brazil and Australia, where Melbourne's Herald Sun ranked the latter adaptation, "We're from Tigerland", as the best Australian Football League club song.

== See also ==
- Academy of Music/Riviera Theatre
- "By the Light of the Silvery Moon"
- Encores!
- Esther's Follies
- Alfred Cheney Johnston
- The Fabulous Palm Springs Follies
- The Passing Show
- Joseph Urban
- Ziegfeld Theatre
- The Aqua Follies (water ballet version of the Follies)
