= J. C. Huffman =

American theatrical director

- Born: Jesse C. Huffman; 1869; Bowling Green, Ohio, United States
- Died: 1935 (aged 65–66); United States
- Occupation: Theatrical director
- Known for: The Passing Show

Jesse C. Huffman (1869–1935) was an American theatrical director. Between 1906 and 1932 he directed or staged over 200 shows, mostly for the Shubert Brothers. Many of them were musical revues, musicals or operettas. He is known for The Passing Show series of revues that he staged from 1914 to 1924 at the Winter Garden Theatre on Broadway, daring alternatives to the Ziegfeld Follies.

== Early years ==
Jesse C. Huffman was born in Bowling Green, Ohio, in 1869. His father had been a general in the American Civil War. Huffman became a boy actor at the age of twelve. Later he became stage director for the Harry Davis Stock Company in Pittsburgh, Pennsylvania. He was introduced to the New York theater scene by the actor Richard Mansfield. Huffman soon showed he had a talent as a director of book musicals with loose plots, and of musical revues.

In 1911 Huffman was made general director for the shows staged by the Shubert brothers in New York and on the touring circuit. The Shuberts had the largest chain of theaters in the USA. Shows would first be played on Broadway, sometimes for just one day at the Ambassador Theatre so they could be advertised as "direct from Broadway", then sent on the road. The Shuberts arranged shows on a production line system. Sigmund Romberg composed or arranged the music; Harold R. Atteridge wrote the lyrics and librettos; Huffman directed the shows; Watson Barr designed the sets; and Allan K. Foster choreographed the dance numbers.

== Passing Show ==
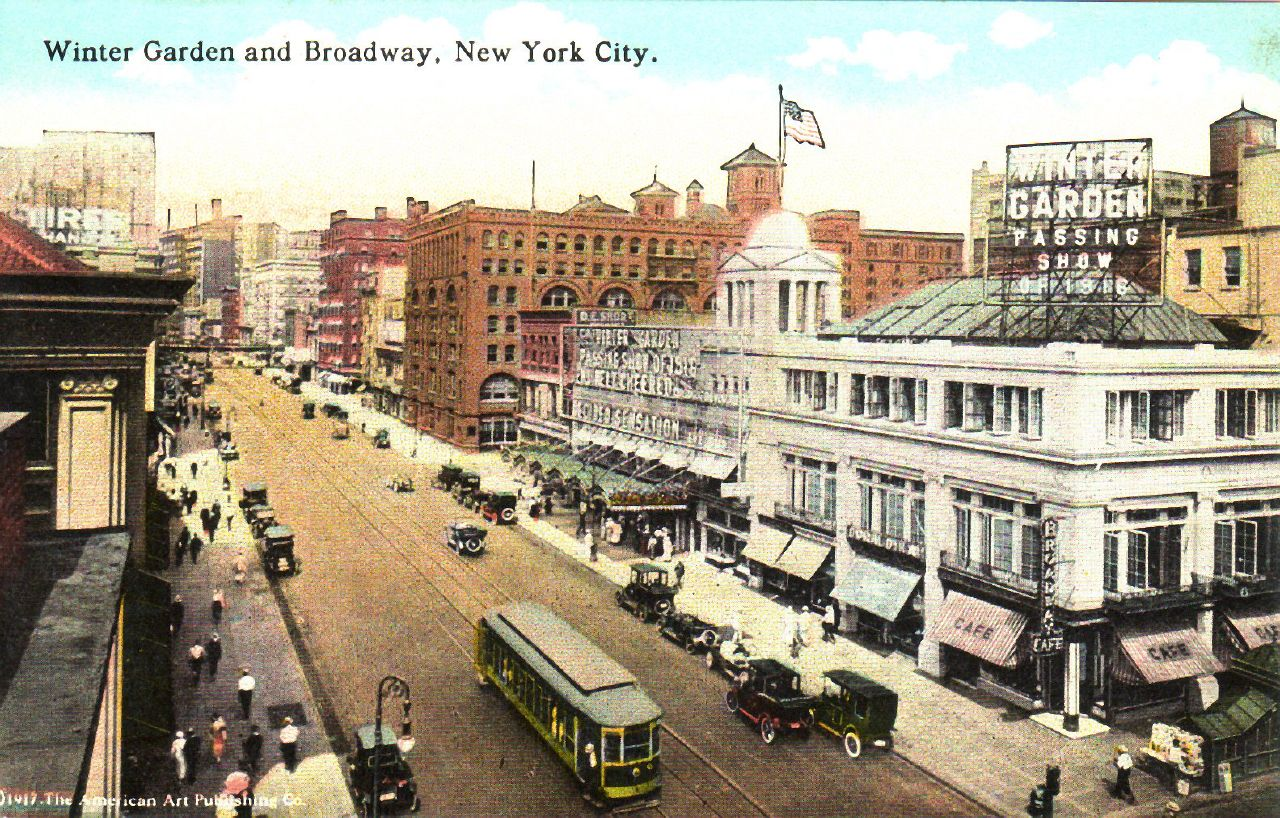
The Winter Garden Theatre in 1916, showing The Passing Show

Huffman was responsible for The Passing Show series of revues from 1914 to 1924. The Shuberts first staged The Passing Show in 1912 in competition with the Ziegfeld Follies. Extravagant musical numbers and comedy sketches were roughly linked to an overall narrative. The Shubert staff writer Harold Atteridge prepared the book for the Passing Show of 1914 and continued with several subsequent shows. Huffman was credited with staging the revue, which presumably meant he handled overall direction, including blocking, and also was involved in set design and lighting.

The Passing Show continued to compete with the Follies into the 1920s, offering a more risqué alternative where the girls came ever closer to being completely nude. The last Passing Show opened on 3 September 1924 and ran for 106 performances. Huffman was director, and other Shubert staff including Romberg, Atteridge and Barret supplied music, lyrics and sets. The show featured the song Nothing Naughty in a Nightie.

== Other musicals and revues ==
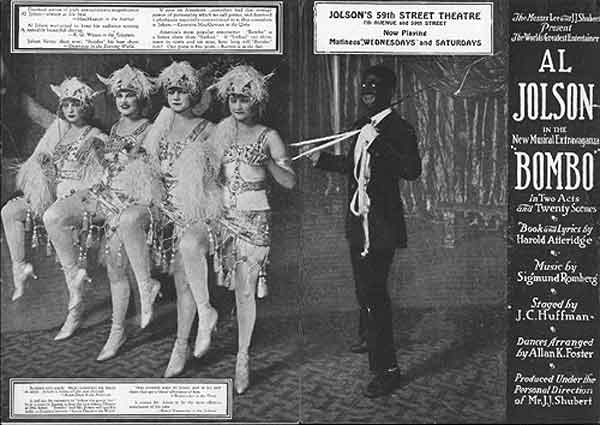
Flyer for the Al Jolson vehicle Bombo (1921) staged by J.C. Huffman

In February 1914 Huffman drew praise for the very modern stage settings used for Percy MacKaye's fantastic romance A Thousand Years Ago. He directed the operetta The Peasant Girl which played on Broadway in 1915. Huffman also directed Al Jolson vehicles such as Robinson Crusoe, Jr. (1916), Sinbad (1918), Bombo (1921) and Big Boy (1925). Huffman was involved in many other Shubert musicals, particularly revues. In 1922 he staged Make It Snappy, a revue that starred Eddie Cantor. This was one of the "miscellaneously titled collations of froth" used to fill the Winter Garden Theatre while The Passing Show was away.

As the Roaring Twenties progressed, shows became more daring. Huffman acquiesced in J.J. Shubert's demand that the girls in the 1923 revue Artists and Models show their bare breasts. There were two fully nude scenes in this show, drawing comments from the local papers. One critic wrote, "Never before in an American revue has a similar degree of nudity been obtained." Out of town papers were scandalized, but described the show in considerable detail. The show reopened the Winter Garden on 15 November 1927, staged by Huffman, with arrangements of one hundred nude chorus girls as a bracelet and as a cathedral. It ran for nineteen weeks.

== Operettas ==
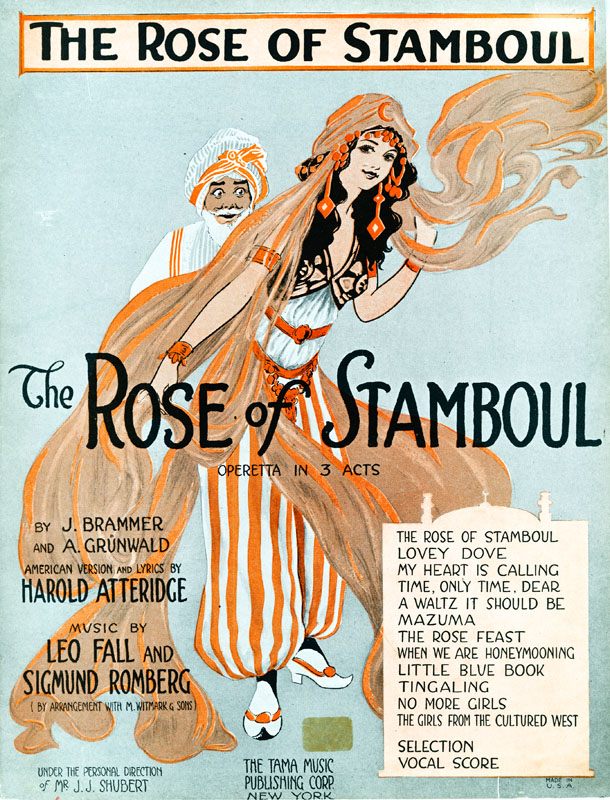
Sheet music cover for The Rose of Stamboul (1922)

In the 1920s Huffman staged or directed many operettas for the Shuberts. These included The Rose of Stamboul (1922), My Maryland (1927), The Circus Princess (1927) and Countess Maritza (1928). Other original Broadway productions of operettas included Blossom Time and The Student Prince. The operetta Blossom Time, with music by Franz Schubert arranged by Sigmund Romberg and lyrics and book by Dorothy Donnelly, opened at the Ambassador Theatre in New York on 29 September 1921 and ran for 592 performances. Huffman was the director. This was the second longest running musical of the 1920s. At one point Blossom Time was running simultaneously (with different casts but essentially the same crew) at the Shubert Theatre and at the 44th Street Theatre.

The Student Prince in Heidelberg had music by Sigmund Romberg and book and lyrics by Dorothy Donnelly, based on the play Old Heidelberg by Rudolf Bleichman. The show, directed by Huffman, opened at Jolson's 59th Street Theatre in New York on 2 December 1924, and ran for 608 performances. The Student Prince opened at His Majesty's Theatre in London on 3 February 1926, again directed by Huffman, and ran for 96 performances. It was the longest-running musical of the 1920s.

== Last years ==
Huffman directed shows throughout the 1920s and into the start of the 1930s. Nina Rosa, a musical play, ran for 137 performances at the Majestic Theatre in New York from 20 September 1930 to 17 January 1931. Lee and J.J. Shubert produced the show, and Huffman was credited with staging the entire production. Busby Berkeley said he had worked on the show, but was not credited, perhaps due to a disagreement with the Shuberts.

Jesse C. Huffman died in 1935. It has been estimated that he directed or staged over 200 shows during his career.

== List of Broadway shows ==
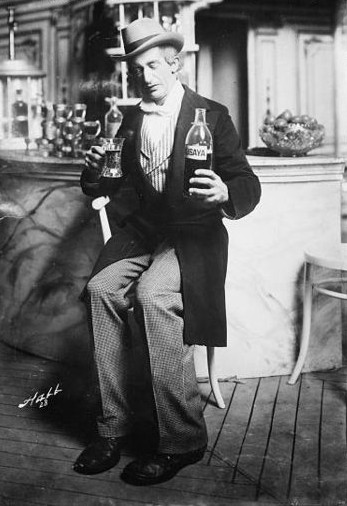
Lew Fields as Henry Schniff in The Girl Behind the Counter (1907–08)

Broadway shows directed or staged by Huffman included:

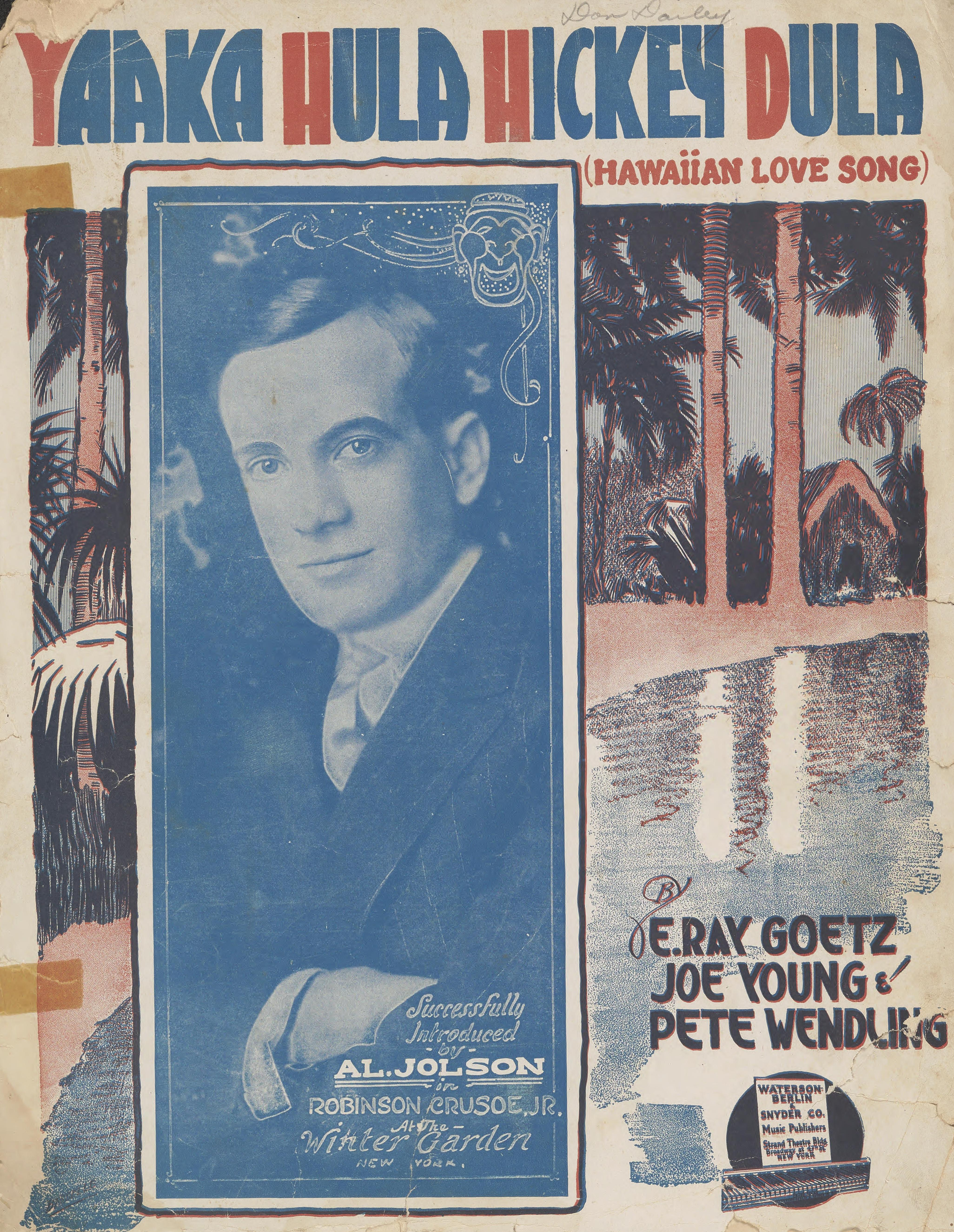
Sheet music cover "Yaaka Hula Hickey Dula (Hawaiian Love Song)", with photo of singer Al Jolson, from Robinson Crusoe, Jr.

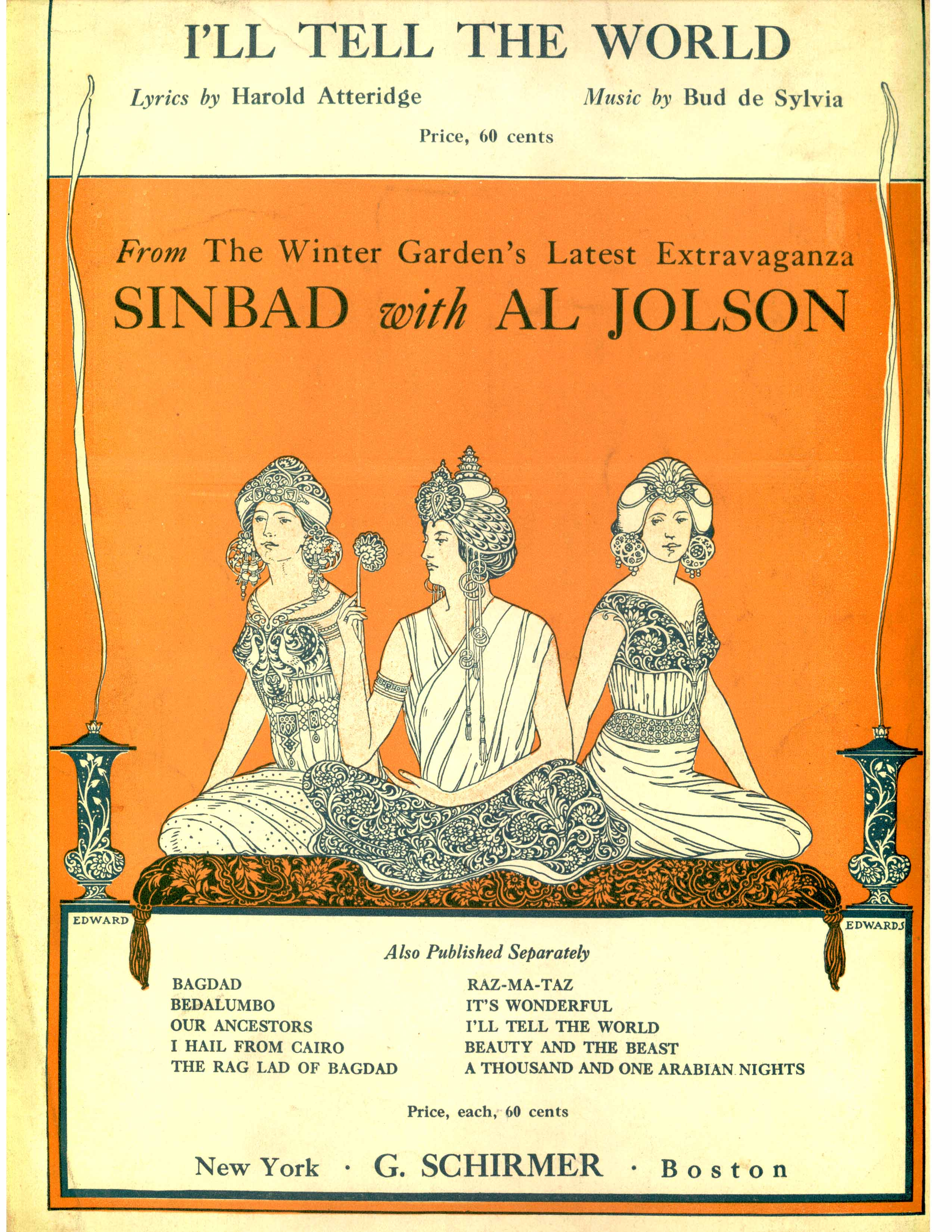
Cover of sheet music "I'll Tell the World" from the musical Sinbad (1918)

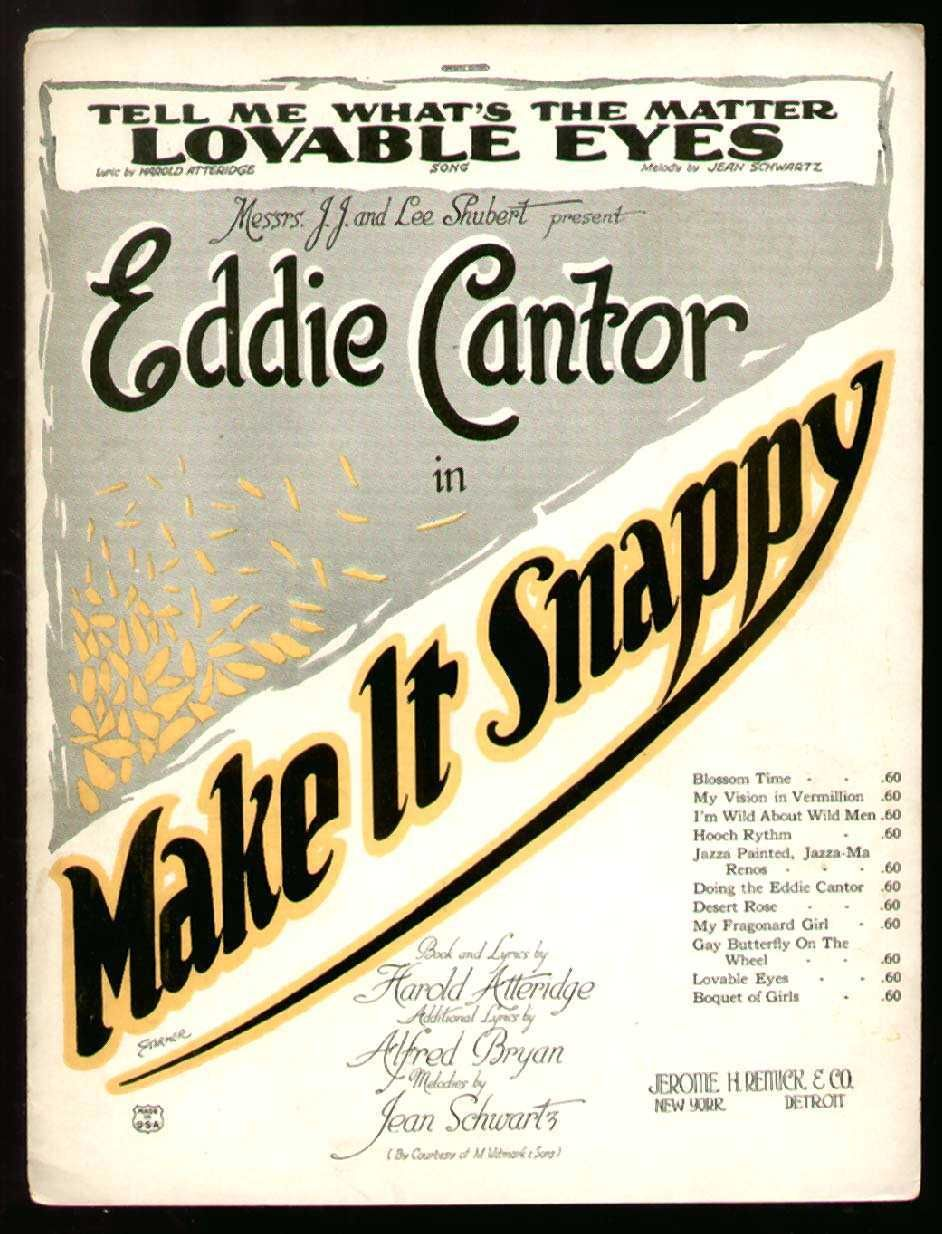
Cover of sheet music for Make It Snappy (1922)

=== Pre-war ===
- The Shulamite (melodrama) Director: October 29, 1906 – November 1906
- The Love Route (melodrama) Staging: October 30, 1906 – December 1906
- The Road to Yesterday (comedy) Director: December 31, 1906 – August 1907
- The White Hen (musical comedy) Staging: February 16, 1907 – May 18, 1907
- The Girl Behind the Counter (musical comedy) Director: October 1, 1907 – June 6, 1908
- Nearly a Hero (musical comedy) Staging: February 24, 1908 – June 6, 1908
- The Mimic World (1908) (revue) Staging: July 9, 1908 – October 3, 1908
- Mlle. Mischief (operetta) Staging: September 28, 1908 – December 19, 1908
- Going Some (farce) Director: April 12, 1909 – July 1909
- The Ringmaster (drama) Staging: August 9, 1909 – September 1909
- Bow-Sing (opera) Director: March 20, 1911 – June 10, 1911
- La Belle Paree (revue) Staging: March 20, 1911 – June 10, 1911, September 11, 1911 – September 16, 1911
- The Kiss Waltz (operetta) Staging: September 18, 1911 – December 2, 1911
- The Never Homes (musical comedy) Staging: October 5, 1911 – December 23, 1911
- The Duchess (comic opera) Staging: October 16, 1911 – November 4, 1911
- A Night with the Pierrots / Sesostra / The Whirl of Society (musical comedy) Staging: March 5, 1912 – June 29, 1912
- Two Little Brides (musical comedy) Staging: April 23, 1912 – June 15, 1912
- The Man with Three Wives (operetta) Staging: January 23, 1913 – March 8, 1913
- Lieber Augustin (operetta) Staging: September 3, 1913 – October 4, 1913
- Oh, I Say! (musical comedy) Staging: October 30, 1913 – December 27, 1913

=== War years ===
- The Passing Show of 1914 (revue) Staging: June 1, 1914 – September 3, 1914
- Miss Daisy (musical comedy) Staging: September 9, 1914 – October 3, 1914
- Dancing Around (revue) Staging: October 10, 1914 – February 13, 1915
- Experience (play with music) Director: October 27, 1914 – June 5, 1915
- Maid in America (revue) Staging: February 18, 1915 – May 22, 1915
- The Peasant Girl (musical comedy) Staging: March 2, 1915 – June 5, 1915
- The Passing Show of 1915 (revue) Staging: May 29, 1915 – October 2, 1915
- A World of Pleasure (revue) Staging: October 14, 1915 – January 22, 1916
- Robinson Crusoe, Jr. (musical burlesque) Director: February 17, 1916 – June 10, 1916
- The Passing Show of 1916 (revue) Staging: June 22, 1916 – October 21, 1916
- The Show of Wonders (revue) Staging: October 26, 1916 – April 21, 1917
- The Passing Show of 1917 (revue) Staging: April 26, 1917 – October 13, 1917
- My Lady's Glove (operetta) Staging: June 18, 1917 – June 30, 1917
- Doing Our Bit (revue) Director: October 18, 1917 – February 9, 1918
- Over the Top (revue) Director: November 28, 1917 – February 2, 1918
- Experience (play with music) Staging: January 22, 1918 – Closing date unknown
- Sinbad (revue) Director: February 14, 1918 – March 29, 1919
- Follow the Girl (musical comedy) Staging: March 2, 1918 – March 23, 1918
- Fancy Free (musical comedy) Staging: April 11, 1918 – July 20, 1918
- The Passing Show of 1918 (revue) Staging: July 25, 1918 – November 9, 1918
- Monte Cristo Jr. (musical burlesque) Staging: February 12, 1919 – October 4, 1919
- Shubert Gaieties of 1919 (revue) Staging: July 17, 1919 – October 18, 1919
- The Passing Show of 1919 (revue) Staging: October 23, 1919 – June 5, 1920

=== Jazz age ===
- The Magic Melody (musical comedy) Staging: November 11, 1919 – March 17, 1920
- Frivolities of 1920 (revue) Production Supervision: January 8, 1920 – February 28, 1920
- Cinderella on Broadway (revue) Staging: June 24, 1920 – September 25, 1920
- Broadway Brevities of 1920 (revue) Director: September 29, 1920 – December 18, 1920
- The Passing Show of 1921 (revue) Staging: December 29, 1920 – May 28, 1921
- Just Married (comedy) Director: April 26, 1921 – Closing date unknown
- The Last Waltz (operetta) Director: May 10, 1921 – October 29, 1921
- Blossom Time (operetta) Staging: September 29, 1921 – January 27, 1923
- Bombo (musical comedy) Staging: October 6, 1921 – April 8, 1922
- The Rose of Stamboul (operetta) Staging: March 7, 1922 – June 10, 1922
- Make It Snappy (revue) Staging: April 13, 1922 – July 1, 1922
- Whispering Wires (drama) Director: August 7, 1922 – June 1923
- The Passing Show of 1922 (revue) Staging: September 20, 1922 – December 2, 1922
- Springtime of Youth (musical comedy) Staging: October 26, 1922 – December 23, 1922
- The Dancing Girl (musical comedy) Director: January 24, 1923 – May 12, 1923
- The Passing Show of 1923 (revue) Director: June 14, 1923 – September 15, 1923
- Topics of 1923 (revue) Director: November 20, 1923 – March 22, 1924
- The Dream Girl (musical comedy) Staging: August 20, 1924 – November 29, 1924
- The Passing Show of 1924 (revue) Staging: September 3, 1924 – November 22, 1924
- The Student Prince (operetta) Staging: December 2, 1924 – May 18, 1926
- Big Boy (musical comedy) Staging: January 7, 1925 – March 14, 1925
- June Days (musical comedy) Staging: August 6, 1925 – October 17, 1925
- Princess Flavia (operetta) Staging: November 2, 1925 – March 13, 1926
- A Night in Paris (revue) Staging: January 5, 1926 – July 10, 1926
- Blossom Time (operetta) Staging: March 8, 1926 – March 20, 1926
- The Great Temptations (revue) Staging: May 18, 1926 – November 6, 1926
- The Merry World (revue) Staging: June 8, 1926 – August 21, 1926
- A Night in Paris (revue) Staging: July 26, 1926 – October 30, 1926
- Katja (operetta) Staging: October 18, 1926 – January 22, 1927
- The Pearl of Great Price (drama) Staging: November 1, 1926 – November 1926
- Gay Paree (1926) (revue) Staging: November 9, 1926 – April 9, 1927
- The Circus Princess (operetta) Staging: April 25, 1927 – October 8, 1927
- My Maryland (musical comedy) Staging: September 12, 1927 – June 9, 1928
- The Love Call (musical comedy) Staging: October 24, 1927 – January 7, 1928
- Artists and Models (1927) (revue) Staging: November 15, 1927 – March 24, 1928
- Lovely Lady (musical comedy) Staging: December 29, 1927 – May 19, 1928
- Countess Maritza (operetta) Staging: April 9, 1928 – April 1928
- The Greenwich Village Follies (1928) (revue) Director: April 9, 1928 – July 28, 1928
- Nina Rosa (musical comedy) Director: September 20, 1930 – January 17, 1931
- Marching By (musical comedy) Staging: March 3, 1932 – March 12, 1932

== Sources ==
- Bloom, Ken (2004). Broadway: Its History, People, and Places : an Encyclopedia. Taylor & Francis. ISBN 978-0-415-93704-7.
- Gilman, Lawrence (February 1914). "Music and Drama: Significant Happenings of the Month". The North American Review. 199 (699). University of Northern Iowa: 286–293. JSTOR 25120178.
- Green, Stanley (2009-04-30). Encyclopedia of the Musical Theatre. Da Capo Press. ISBN 978-0-7867-4684-2.
- Hischak, Thomas S. (2006-01-01). Enter the Playmakers: Directors and Choreographers on the New York Stage. Scarecrow Press. ISBN 978-0-8108-5747-6.
- Hischak, Thomas S. (2009-03-16). Broadway Plays and Musicals: Descriptions and Essential Facts of More Than 14,000 Shows through 2007. McFarland. ISBN 978-0-7864-5309-2.
- "Huffman, J. C. (1869–1935)". American National Biography Online. Oxford University Press. February 2000. ISBN 9780198606697.
- "J. C. Huffman". IBDB.
- "Make It Snappy". IBDB.
- Smith, Cecil (1981). Musical Comedy in America. Psychology Press. ISBN 978-0-87830-564-3.
- Spivak, Jeffrey (2010-11-29). Buzz: The Life and Art of Busby Berkeley. University Press of Kentucky. ISBN 978-0-8131-2644-9.
- Stewart, John (2006). Broadway Musicals, 1943-2004. McFarland. ISBN 978-1-4766-0329-2.
- Vallillo, Stephen M. (March 1981). "Broadway Revues in the Teens and Twenties: Smut and Slime?". The Drama Review. 25 (1, Sex and Performance Issue). The MIT Press: 25–34. doi:10.2307/1145341. JSTOR 1145341.
- Westover, Jonas (2009–2010). "Putting It Together: The Creative Team and Players of The Passing Show of 1914" (PDF). The Passing Show. Vol. 28. Archived from the original (PDF) on 2014-06-06.
