= Big Boy (musical) =

1925 musical

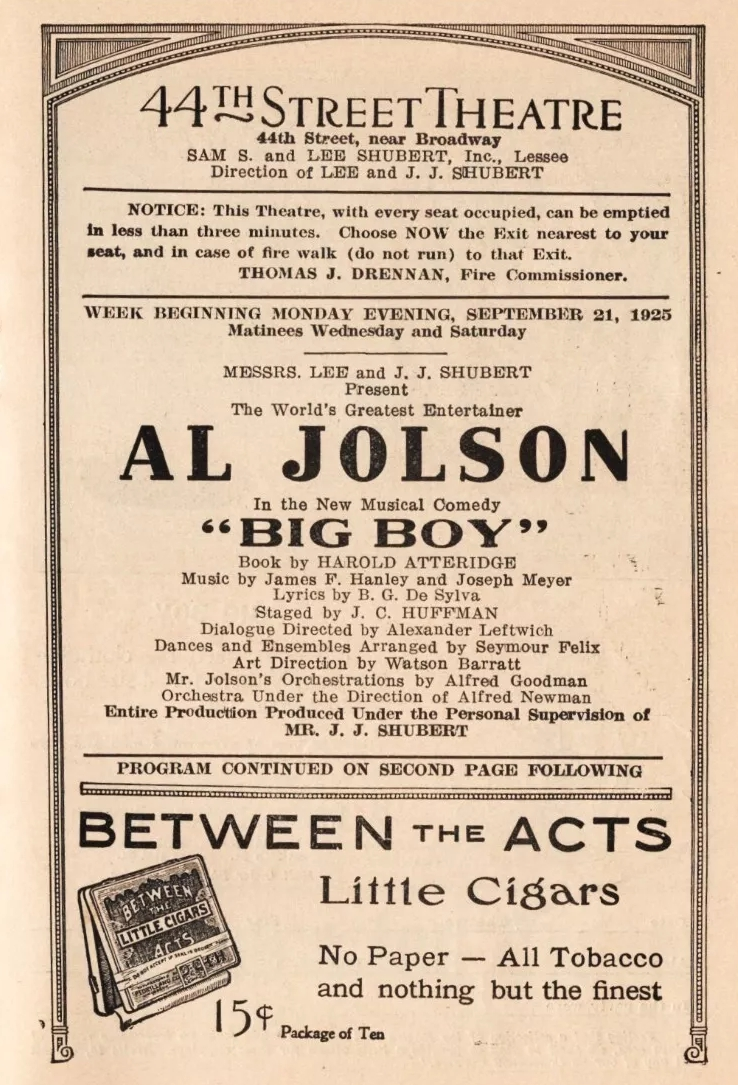
Playbill title for the original 1925 production

Big Boy is a 1925 musical written by Harold R. Atteridge, music by James F. Hanley and Joseph Meyer, and lyrics by Buddy DeSylva. The show featured Al Jolson as Gus, a downtrodden African-American stable boy who ends up as a jockey winning the Kentucky Derby. The all-but-one-man show, which introduced the standard "It All Depends on You", was turned into a film in 1930. Dances and Ensembles Arranged by Seymour Felix and Larry Ceballos; Staged by J. C. Huffman; Dialogue Directed by Alexander Leftwich
