= My Mammy =

1918 popular song

Original Sheet Music for "My Mammy" in Broadway's Sinbad

"My Mammy" is an American popular song with music by Walter Donaldson and lyrics by Joe Young and Sam M. Lewis.

Though associated with Al Jolson, who performed the song very successfully, "My Mammy" was performed first in 1918 by William Frawley as a vaudeville act. Saul Bornstein, the general manager in early 1921 for Irving Berlin Music Publishing, brought the song to Jolson's attention; Jolson first interpolated the song in January 1921 to the Broadway show Sinbad which was in the fourth year of its run. Jolson recorded this song twice and performed it in films, including The Jazz Singer (1927) and Rose of Washington Square (1939). His voice can also be heard (dubbing actor Larry Parks) singing the song in The Jolson Story (1946).

The group The Happenings revived the song in 1967 with a recording that reached #13 on the Billboard Hot 100. Around that same time, Liza Minnelli began to incorporate the song into her nightclub act; she would continue to perform "My Mammy" throughout her long concert career. During their PopMart Tour of 1997–98, rock music band U2 would often quote the line "The sun shines east, the sun shines west, I know where the sun shines best" in performances of their song, "Miami". The British rock band The Psychedelic Furs parodied it in their song "We Love You", singing "I would walk a million smiles for one of your miles". In the Broadway musical Thoroughly Modern Millie, the song is parodied in the song "Muqǐn". It is also parodied in the jukebox musical Our House in the songs "Rise and Fall" and "The Sun and the Rain (Act II)".

== Lyrics and interpretation ==
The song is a love song from son to his mother, expressing his regrets and longing for her, and hoping she will recognize him after he has been away for a long time.

However, in certain contexts, it can be considered as a tribute sung by a man who, during his childhood, was nurtured by a "mammy", a slave used as a surrogate mother who supplanted the role that would have otherwise been provided by his biological mother. In the song, this person, now an adult, is returning to his aging mammy and proclaiming his unconditional love for her, hoping that despite her age she can still recognise him as her "little baby".

== Recorded versions ==
The song "My Mammy" has been recorded by many artists, including:

- Arthur Fields
- John Arpin
- William Frawley
- Clive Baldwin
- Eddie Cantor
- Cher
- Cameo
- Brian Conley
- Dion
- The Everly Brothers
- Eddie Fisher
- The Happenings
- Ted Heath
- Al Jolson
- Isham Jones
- Jerry Lewis
- Liza Minnelli
- Norfolk Jazz & Jubilee Quartets
- Tony Pastor
- Peerless Quartet
- Paul Robeson
- Kenny Rogers (with Bobby Doyle)
- Jimmy Roselli
- Slappin' Mammys
- Aileen Stanley
- Pete Wending
- Paul Whiteman Orchestra
- Harry Yerkes
- Lena Zavaroni
