= Robinson Crusoe, Jr. =

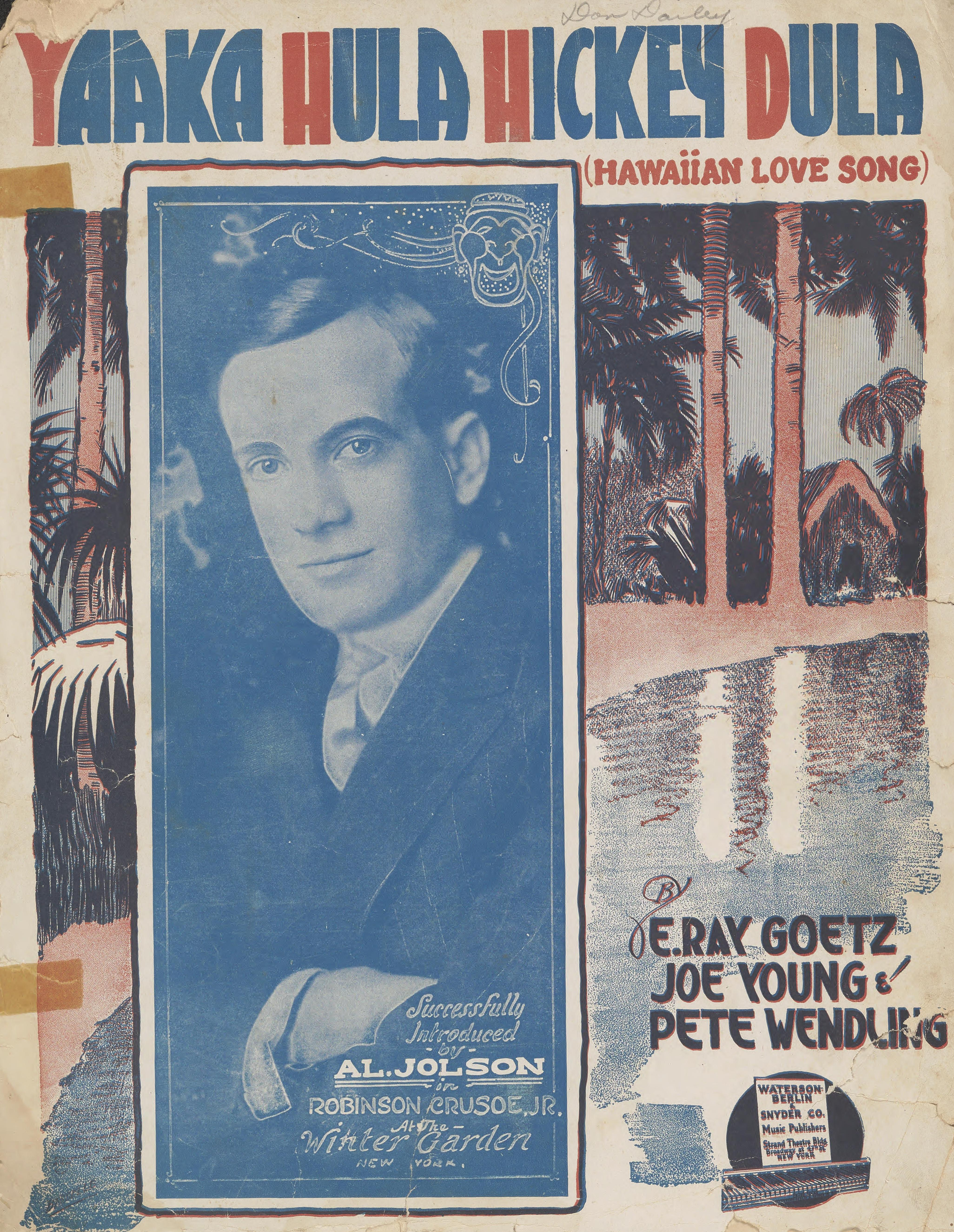
- Sheet music cover (cropped)
- Music: Sigmund Romberg and James Hanley
- Lyrics: Harold Atteridge
- Book: Edgar Smith
- Productions: 1916 Broadway

Robinson Crusoe, Jr. is a 1916 musical with a book by Edgar Smith, lyrics by Harold Atteridge, and music by Sigmund Romberg and James Hanley.

== Production ==
Robinson Crusoe, Jr. was an extravaganza that opened at the Winter Garden Theatre on 17 February 1916. The original Broadway production was produced by Lee Shubert and Jacob J. Shubert, directed by J. C. Huffman and choreographed by Helen Tamiris. Music was by Sigmund Romberg and the book and lyrics were by Harold R. Atteridge. The show was the last major musical that Jacob J. Shubert staged during World War I, and he instructed Romberg to avoid any of his Austro-Hungarian musical idioms.

The cast included Al Jolson, Kitty Doner, Claude Flemming, and Isabelle Rodrigues. The show was built around Jolson, and was a vehicle for Jolson. (Note: Al Jolson's roots in show business came from performing in a carnival and a traveling circus, and then in vaudeville. He mostly worked in blackface, a convention that originated with minstrel shows. His breakthrough came with La Belle Paree in 1911.) A company of two hundred supported Al Jolson in ten major scenes. The show included songs from a number of sources, including some written by Jolson. He often added or removed songs from one show to another. Atteridge created a simple framing story that unified the acts. The show ran on Broadway for 139 performances. It then went on the road in the fall. Jolson sometimes performed twice or three times in one day in one city before moving on.

== Synopsis ==
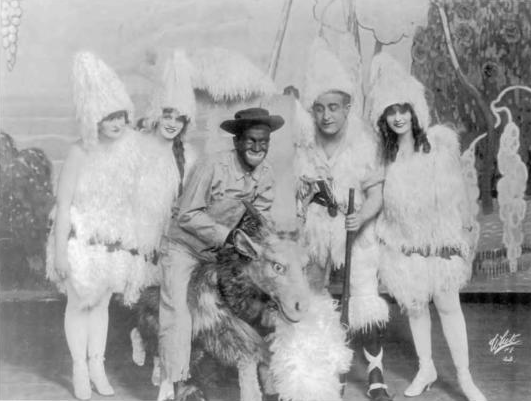
Scene from the show

Setting: Long Island, New York and Robinson Crusoe's Island

Hiram Westbury, a millionaire, is exhausted by some film makers who want to use his estate as a film location. He falls asleep. In his dream, he imagines he is Robinson Crusoe, Jr. His chauffeur, played by Al Jolson, is his Good Friday. Jolson played the chauffeur in blackface. The dreams make up most of the show. After the opening scene the pair travel to Crusoe's island, which is given a haunted forest, and to a pirate ship crewed by chorus girls. The "glittering galaxies of gorgeous, glorious, gladsome girlies mirthfully monopolized the mad, merry hours and the ten tremendous tumultuous scenes of Robinson Crusoe, Jr." At one point in the story trees woke up and began to sway to the music. Jolson has comic interactions with a goat and a crocodile. The shorter second act was set back in the millionaire's home.

There were 27 musical numbers in the show, including five specialty dances. Many of the huge cast danced in Minstrel Days. Jolson himself did not play a major role in the musical numbers, and was always alone on the stage when he sang. According to Jolson's biographer Michael Freedland, Robinson Crusoe, Jr. was "the nearest Jolson had yet come to a show with a real plot ... although from opening night on, it was quite plain that the story was not going to interfere with his domination on stage."

== Songs ==
- "Where Did Robinson Crusoe Go with Friday on Saturday Night?" (Sam M. Lewis & Joe Young (w), George W. Meyer (m))
- "Yaaka Hula Hickey Dula" (E. Ray Goetz & Joe Young (w), Pete Wendling (m))
- "Where the Black-Eyed Susans Grow" (by Dave Radford and Richard Whiting)
