= Sinbad (1918 musical) =

Musical by Harold R. Atteridge premiered in 1918

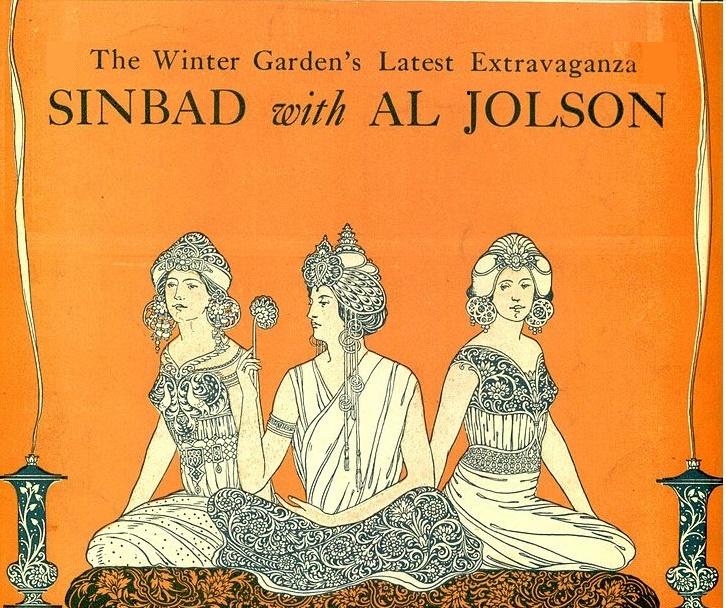
- Sheet music cover (cropped)
- Music: Sigmund Romberg
- Lyrics: Harold Atteridge
- Book: Harold Atteridge
- Productions: 1918 Broadway

Sinbad is a Broadway musical with a book and lyrics by Harold Atteridge and music by Sigmund Romberg, Al Jolson and others. Jolson plays a porter in old Bagdad where he meets a series of characters from the Arabian Nights, including Sinbad. He is transported to various exotic settings.

The musical was produced by Lee Shubert and J. J. Shubert and staged by J. C. Huffman and J. J. Shubert. After a tryout in New Haven, Connecticut, the Broadway production opened on February 14, 1918 at the Winter Garden Theatre, where it ran for 164 performances. The cast included Jolson (in blackface), Kitty Doner, Constance Farber and Forrest Huff. This show was a “musical comedy” with little purpose other than to provide a vehicle for Jolson, who sang specialty songs that were written for him by himself and others, while Romberg's songs held the show together. As with Jolson's previous shows, songs were interpolated during the run and for the national tour, which ran for nearly two years.

== Synopsis ==
At a Long Island country club, Nan Van Decker, a wealthy socialite, struggles to choose which of two men to entrust with a financial matter. She consults a crystal ball, and the ball reveals to her exotic Arabian scenes and people, including Inbad the porter and a middle-eastern version of the Long Island valet, Gus. Fantasy sequences follow, and Inbad meets a series of characters from the Arabian Nights, including Sinbad the Sailor.

== Songs ==
Music by Romberg and lyrics by Atteridge, except as otherwise indicated:

Act 1

- On Cupid's Green – Mildred and Boy and Girl Golfers
- A Little Bit of Every Nationality – Patricia De Trait and Our Allied Beauties
- Our Ancestors – Prince Stubb Talmage, Princess Audrey Van Decker and Cave Men and Girls
- A Thousand and One Arabian Nights – A Cobbler, A Slave Girl and Van Rennsellar Sinbad
- Where Do They Get Those Guys? – Tessie Verdear
- Beauty and the Beast – A Court Lady, Winter Garden Blue Ribbon Girls and Meehan's Leaping Hounds
- Rock-a-Bye Your Baby with a Dixie Melody (music by Jean Schwartz; lyrics by Joe Young and Sam M. Lewis) – Inbad the Porter
- Take the Night Boat to Albany (music by Schwartz; lyrics by Lewis and Young) – Inbad
- Bagdad – A Cobbler and Arabian Desert Girls
- The Rag Lad of Bagdad (music by Jolson and Romberg) – Stubb, Audrey, Frank, Grace, Kickem and Rag Lad Girls
- A Night in the Orient – Amina and Oriental Dreams
- I Hail from Cairo – Tessie and Cairo Girls
- Love Ahoy! – Jeanette Verdear, Kickem, Tapem and Love Ahoy Sailor Girls
- The Bedalumbo (music by Jolson) – Stubb, Kickem, Tapem and Yama Yama Girls

Act 2

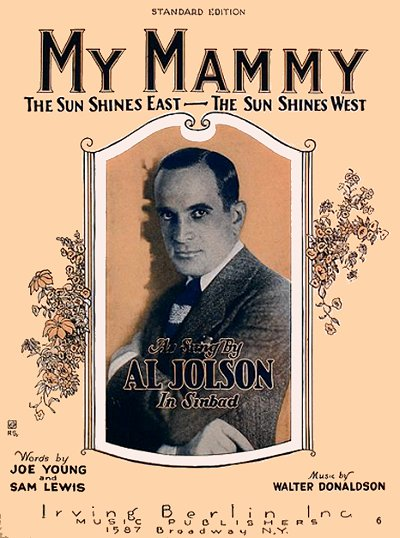
"My Mammy" was interpolated into the show in 1921.

- Isle of Youth – Love and Beauties of Greece
- I'll Tell the World (music and lyrics by Atteridge and Buddy DeSylva) – Van Rennsellar Sinbad and Isle of Youth Dreams
- It's Wonderful – Audrey and Some Wonderful Girls
- Raz-Ma-Taz (music by Jolson) – Stubb, Frank, Johnny and Jazz Girls

Later songs interpolated

- Darktown Dancin’ School (lyric by Jack Yellen, music by Albert Gemble) –
- I'm Not Jealous (words by Harry Pease, music by Ed G. Nelson and Fred Mayo) –
- My Mammy (words by Young and Lewis, music by Walter Donaldson) –
- Tell That To the Marines (words by Atteridge, music by Schwartz and Jolson)
- I'll Say She Does (by DeSylva, Gus Kahn and Jolson) –
- Hello, Central, Give Me No Man's Land (by Young, Lewis and Schwartz) –
- Chloe (by DeSylva and Jolson) –
- Swanee (by Irving Caesar and George Gershwin) –
