= The Passing Show =

Musical revue

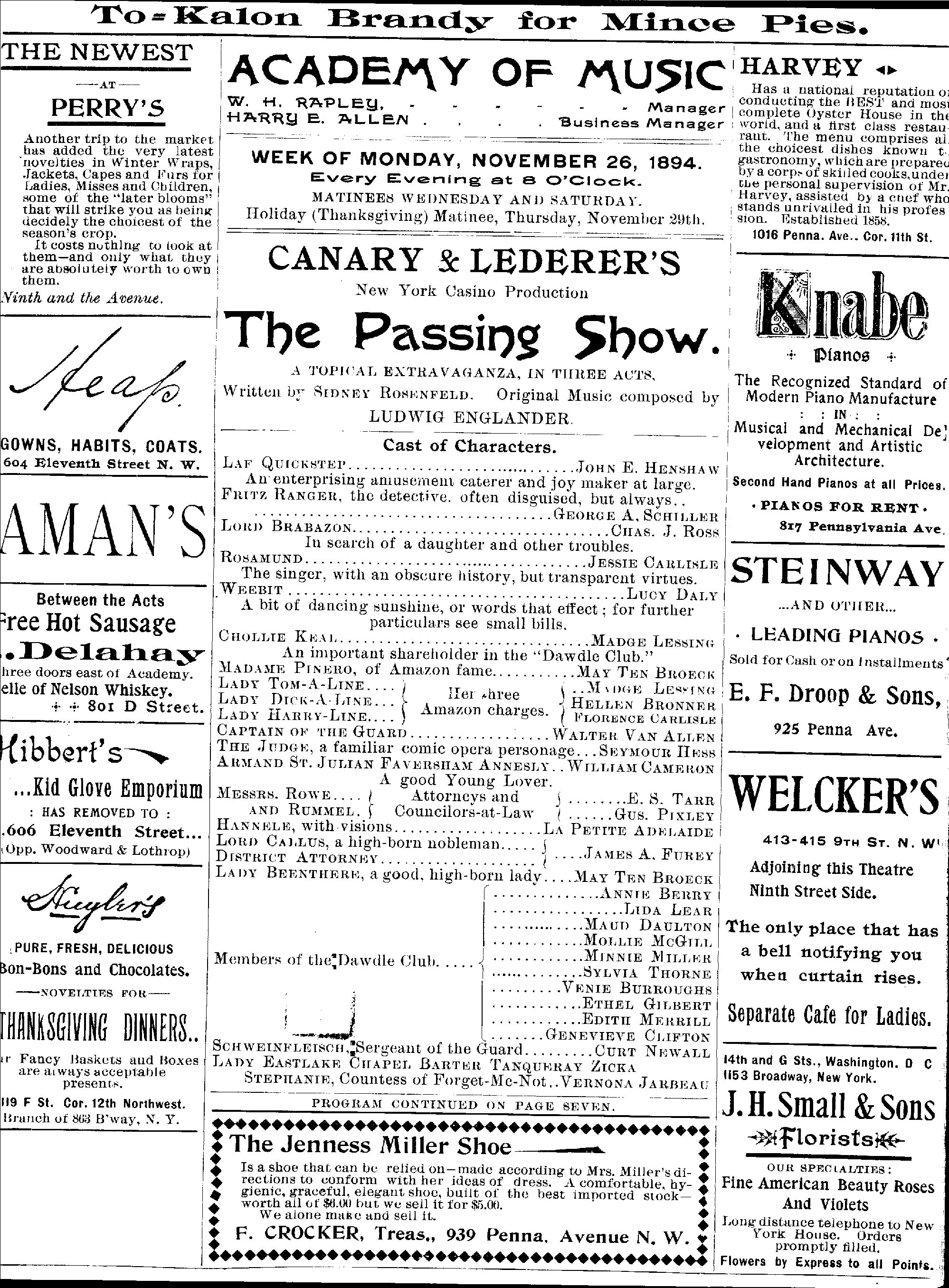
Playbill for The Passing Show on tour in 1894

The Passing Show was a musical revue in three acts, billed as a "topical extravaganza", with a book and lyrics by Sydney Rosenfeld and music by Ludwig Engländer and various other composers. It featured spoofs of theatrical productions of the past season. The show was presented in 1894 by George Lederer at the Casino Theatre. It was one of the first musical revues on Broadway and led the fashion for such productions. The Casino Theatre produced a revue each summer thereafter for several seasons.

In 1912, Lee and Jacob J. Shubert began an annual series of elaborate Broadway revues using the name The Passing Show of 19XX, designed to compete with the popular Ziegfeld Follies.

== Original 1894 version ==
Although a few entertainments that could be called revues had already been presented by such showmen as John Brougham, The Passing Show was the first American revue to use the term, spelling it "review". Its now-familiar structure was to use a thin story line to link together songs and sketches. The show was choreographed by Barney Fagan and Augusto Francioli.

The revue opened at the Casino Theatre on May 12, 1894 and ran for 145 performances before touring in the US. The piece burlesqued theatrical productions of the past season. Among many other sketches, Paul Arthur spoofed Henry Miller, Adele Ritchie portrayed the singer Rosamund, Gus Pixley parodied Rummel, Grace Filkins parodied Rose Coghlan, Mrs. Kendal and Ada Rehan, and Mabel Stephenson appeared as Hannele in a parody of the Kilyani films. John E. Henshaw and Queenie Vassar (later replaced by Madge Lessing) played, respectively, the character Laf Quickstep and Chollie Keal.

The songs (by Rosenfeld and Englander, except as noted) included:

- Old Before His Time
- Leader of De Company B (music and lyrics by Dave Reed, Jr.)
- Riding in the Heavenly Rowboat (music and lyrics by Barney Fagan)
- Some Time Ago – Laf Quickstep
- The Fellow That Played the Drum – Laf Quickstep
- Hot Tamales – Chollie Keal, Members of the Dawdle Club and Ensemble
- Coxey's Army – Armand St. Julien Faversham Annesley, The Judge, District Attorney, Mr. Rowe and Mr. Rummel
- Round the Operas in Twenty Minutes (music by Mascagni, Verdi, Bizet and Gounod)
- L'Enfant Prodigue
- The Phalanx of Phidias

The New York Times review of the show noted, "We do not know what a topical extravaganza is; neither do they." The paper wrote that the show contained "elements of amusement" and "a momentary glance at most of the interesting entertainments" of the winter season. "There was a good deal of really pretty music by Mr. Englander, and some of Mr. Rosenfeld's lines were bright. But there were great wearisome spaces of emptiness...."

== The Passing Show, 1912 to 1924 ==
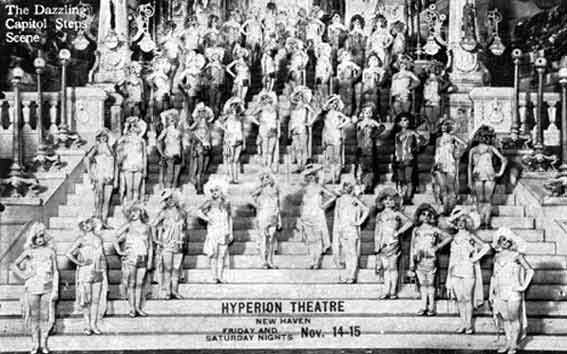
Photo from The Passing Show of 1913

The title of the show was later used by Lee and Jacob J. Shubert for an annual series of Broadway revues from 1912 to 1924 (except 1920). These were elaborate productions designed to compete with the popular Ziegfeld Follies, which had begun in 1907.

Several of these featured music of Sigmund Romberg, George Gershwin, Jean Schwartz, Al Sherman or Herman Finck and were presented at the Winter Garden Theatre. Willie and Eugene Howard starred in many editions of the series. Other stars included Charlotte Greenwood, Marilyn Miller, Ed Wynn, De Wolf Hopper, Charles Winninger, Fred Astaire and his sister Adele, Marie Dressler and Fred Allen. Among the famous songs first sung in the series were "Pretty Baby" (1916) and "I'm Forever Blowing Bubbles" (1918). A planned revival of the series in the 1940s did not make it out of tryouts. Most of the librettos for the series were written by Harold R. Atteridge, the Shuberts' in‐house librettist, who created over forty musicals for them (many starring Al Jolson). Most of the Shubert shows were staged by J. C. Huffman.

== The Passing Show, 1932 ==
The Shubert family produced a last version of The Passing Show that played at the Cass Theatre in Detroit, Michigan, and the Shubert Theatre in Cincinnati, Ohio, in 1932. It was staged by Zeke Colvan, and choreographed by Gertrude Hoffmann and Dan Carthe. It never transferred to Broadway. Contributing lyricists for this show included Charles Kenny, Max Lief, Nathaniel Lief, Malcolm McComb, Harry Ruskin, and Frank Sullivan. Composers who contributed music included Michael H. Cleary, Herman Hupfeld, William C. K. Irwin, Samuel Pokrass, and Serge Walter. Lester Allen was one of the stars of the show.

== See also ==
- The Passing Show of 1916
- The Passing Show of 1918
