= Winter Garden Theatre =

Broadway theater in Manhattan, New York

- Cadillac Winter Garden Theatre
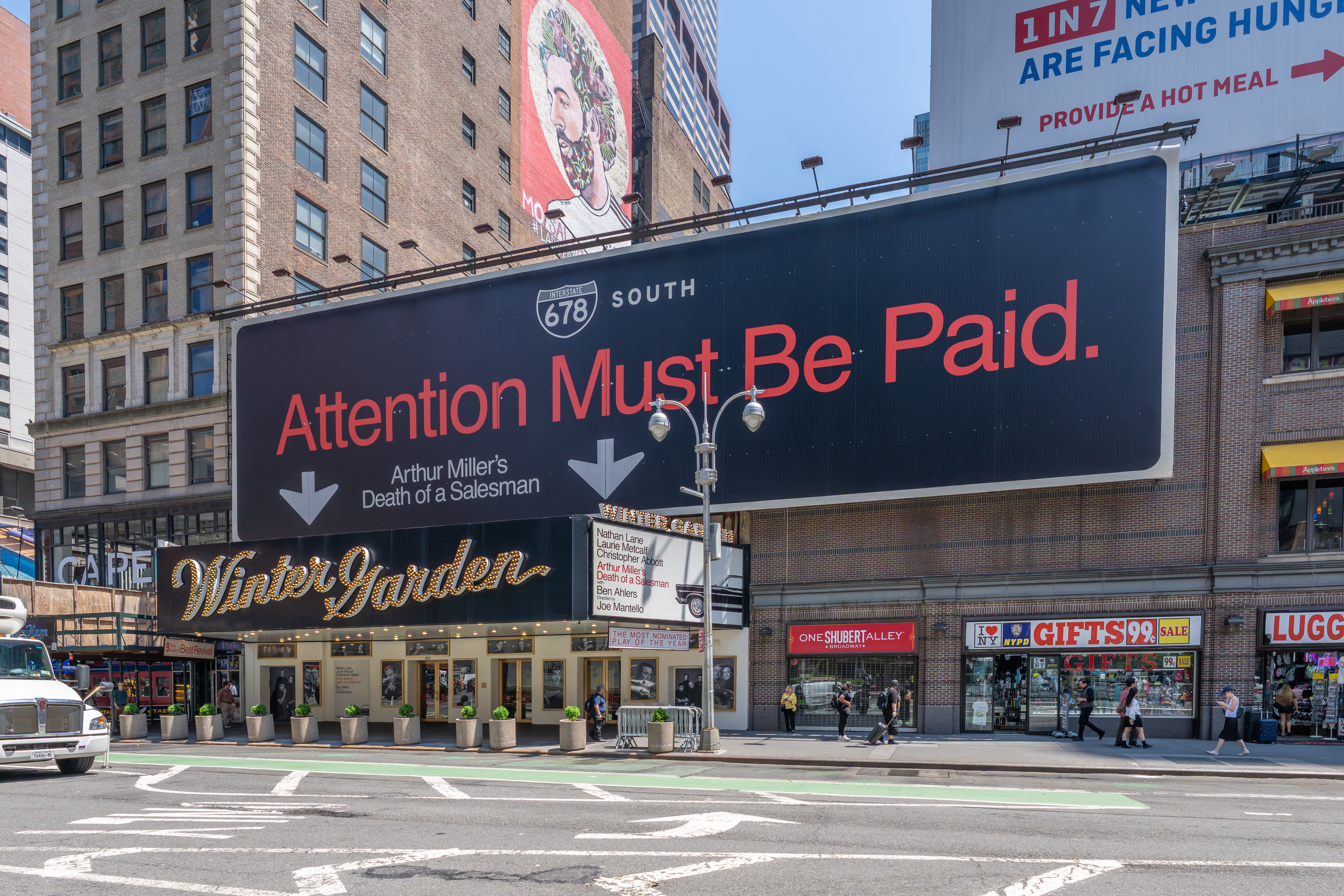
- Interactive map of Winter Garden Theatre
- Address: 1634 Broadway; Manhattan, New York; United States
- Coordinates: 40°45′42″N 73°59′01″W
- Owner: Shubert Organization
- Capacity: 1,600
- Type: Broadway
- Production: Much Ado About Nothing

Construction
- Opened: 1896; 130 years ago (original structure) March 20, 1911 (115 years ago) (theatre)
- Rebuilt: 1922–1923
- Years active: 1911–1928, 1933–1945, 1948–present
- Architects: William Albert Swasey (original theater); Herbert J. Krapp (rebuild)

Website
- Official website

New York City Landmark
- Designated: January 5, 1988; 38 years ago
- Reference no.: 1387
- Designated entity: Lobby and auditorium interior

The Winter Garden Theatre is a Broadway theatre at 1634 Broadway in the Midtown Manhattan neighborhood of New York City, U.S. Originally designed by architect William Albert Swasey, it opened in 1911. The Winter Garden's current design dates to 1922, when it was completely remodeled by Herbert J. Krapp. Due to the size of its auditorium, stage, and backstage facilities, it is favored for large musical productions. It has 1,600 seats and is operated by The Shubert Organization. The auditorium interior is a New York City landmark.

The Winter Garden Theatre was adapted from the old building of the American Horse Exchange, completed in 1896. Its original façade consisted of several arches on Broadway, which were subsequently converted to a brick wall with a large sign. The interior is covered with detailing in the Adam style. Though the auditorium contains a single balcony above the orchestra level, the boxes are arranged in two levels above the orchestra. The auditorium contains a ribbed ceiling, which originally had exposed trusses prior to Krapp's renovation. The proscenium and stage also date to Krapp's renovation, when they were scaled down from their original size.

The Winter Garden was originally operated by brothers Lee and Jacob J. Shubert. In its early days, the theater frequently hosted series of revues presented under the umbrella titles The Passing Show, Artists and Models, and the Greenwich Village Follies. The Winter Garden served as a Warner Bros. movie house from 1928 to 1933 and a United Artists cinema from 1945 to 1948. Aside from these interruptions, it has largely operated as a legitimate theater. From 1982 to 2013, the Winter Garden hosted only two productions: the musicals Cats and Mamma Mia!. The theater was renovated in 2000 and was known as the Cadillac Winter Garden Theatre from 2002 to 2007.

== Site ==
The Winter Garden Theatre is on 1634 Broadway, near Times Square, in the Theater District of Midtown Manhattan in New York City, U.S. The land lot takes up much of the city block bounded by Broadway to the west, 50th Street to the south, Seventh Avenue to the east, and 51st Street to the north. The lot covers 22,744 square feet (2,113.0 m^{2}), with a frontage of 160 feet (49 m) on Broadway, 144 feet (44 m) on 50th Street, and 145 feet (44 m) on Seventh Avenue. Nearby buildings include the Mark Hellinger Theatre (Times Square Church) to the northwest; Axa Equitable Center to the northeast; The Michelangelo to the east; The Theater Center, Brill Building, and Ambassador Theatre to the southwest; and Paramount Plaza to the west. An entrance to the New York City Subway's 50th Street station, serving the 1 train, is just south of the theater's Broadway entrance.

=== Previous building ===
In the late 19th century, what is now Times Square was known as Longacre Square and was heavily frequented by the horse and carriage industry. The site of the Winter Garden Theatre was originally occupied by the American Horse Exchange, which was built by William K. Vanderbilt. The Horse Exchange, on the east side of Broadway between 50th and 51st Streets, was designed by D. & J. Jardine. The exchange sold thoroughbreds at a time when bad horses were commonly being offered. Though the first sale took place in 1880, the Horse Exchange was not completed until the next year.

The original exchange building was a two- and three-story structure covered three-quarters on the block, surrounding a covered horse ring measuring 100 feet (30 m) square. The Broadway wing had dealers' offices on the first floor and the exchange's offices on the second floor, as well as space for carriages and valuable horses. The 50th Street and Seventh Avenue wings had horses on each floor, with 187 box stalls total. The exchange burned down in June 1896, killing close to a hundred horses. After the exchange was destroyed, Vanderbilt hired A. V. Porter to construct a new structure of two to four stories. The new building surrounded a covered ring measuring 160 by 80 feet (49 by 24 m). The new structure reused some of the old exchange's walls and had a brick facade with arched windows, as well as trusses over the ring.

== Design ==
The Winter Garden Theatre's building was adapted from the rebuilt American Horse Exchange. In 1911 the Shubert family leased the building and architect William Albert Swasey redesigned the building as a theater. The Winter Garden was completely remodeled in 1922 by Herbert J. Krapp. The theater is still operated by the Shubert Organization.

=== Facade ===
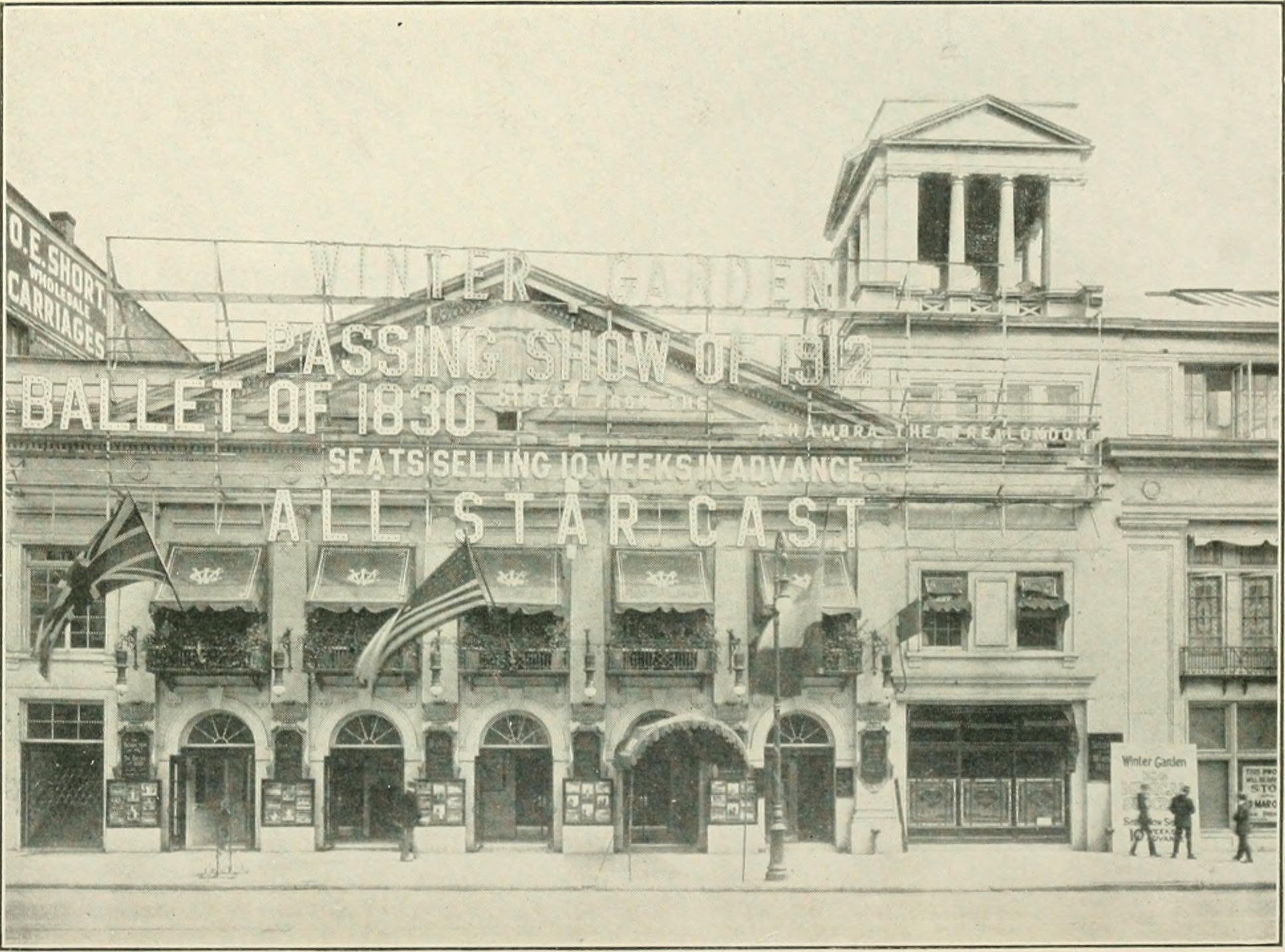
The Winter Garden Theatre's original facade as seen in 1913

As designed, the main entrance was on Broadway and there were ten exits on Seventh Avenue. The Broadway facade was designed in a colonial style with plain gray stone. The original exterior used much of the existing facade of the Horse Exchange, though a cupola was added in the modification, as well as a heavy cornice. The facade had five Palladian-style arches and columns. The columns rose two stories, supporting a cornice and a pediment. Five mahogany doors led to the ticket lobby. The modern facade has large billboards, which have historically been used to advertise the shows at the Winter Garden. The billboards date to at least the 1930s.

The Seventh Avenue facade, originally unornamented, was decorated in the 1922 renovation because of the growing prominence of that avenue. Because of the number of exits to the surrounding streets, Architecture and Building magazine wrote in 1911 that the theater "is said to have more exits than any other auditorium of its size in the United States". A portion of the old American Horse Exchange facade was visible on Seventh Avenue until the late 1990s, when it was refaced in brick.

The theater's relatively small entrance on Broadway allowed the Shubert family to place storefronts along the rest of the Broadway frontage. The corner of Broadway and 50th Street was leased out as an eatery. It was originally designed as a restaurant space in the Flemish style. Over the years, it became a nightclub known as Palais de Danse, Montmartre, and Singapore.

=== Lobbies ===
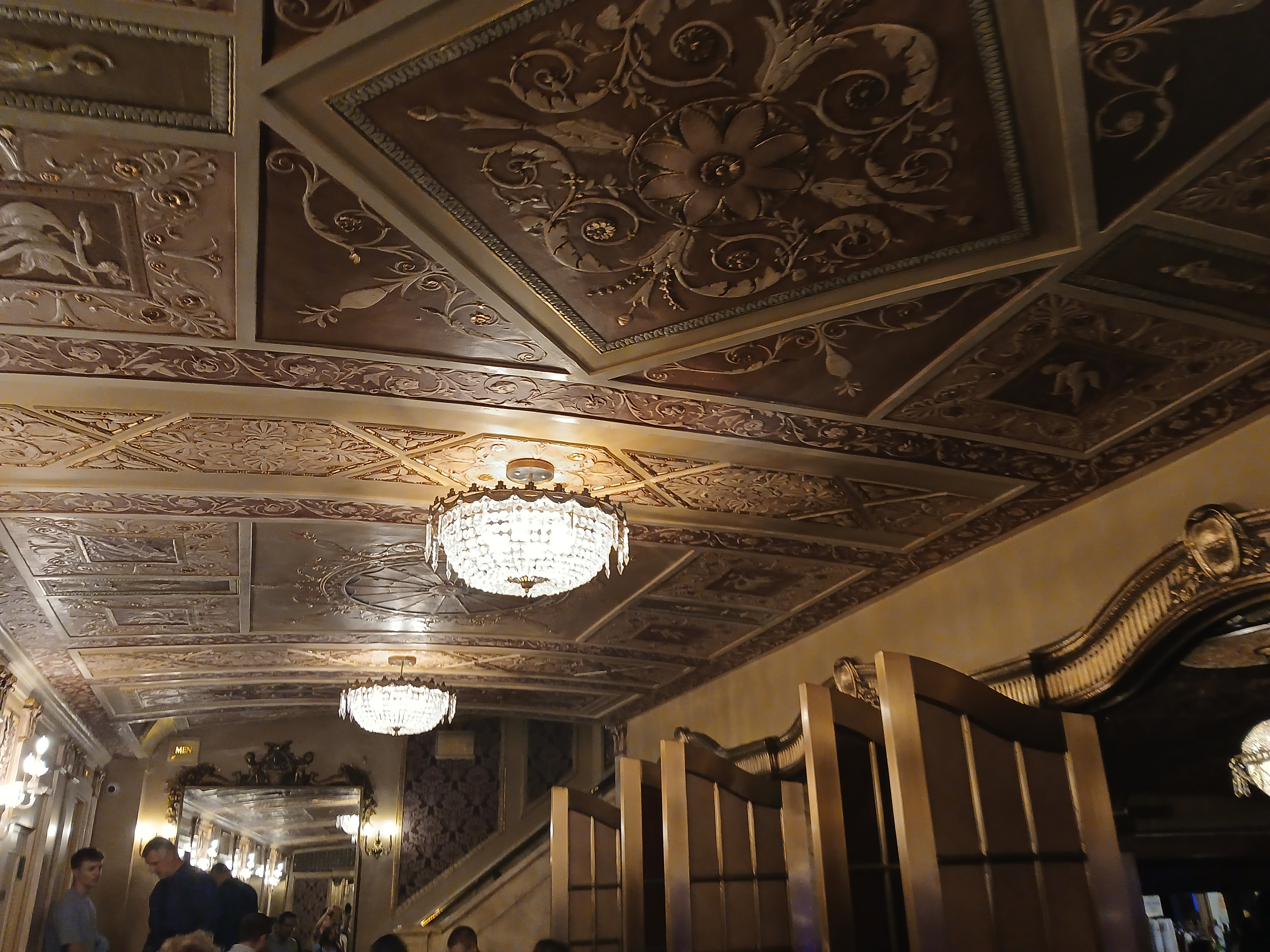
Ceiling of the orchestra-level promenade

The ticket office is just inside the Broadway entrance. It leads to a rectangular inner lobby 20 by 50 feet (6.1 by 15.2 m). The inner lobby is a rectangular space, with doors on the west and east walls. The walls contain panels with foliate decorations in the Adam style. These are separated by Adam-style pilasters, topped by Corinthian-style capitals. The west doors lead to the ticket lobby and are made of bronze. The east doors lead to the auditorium and are made of bronze with glass frames; these doors are separated by pilasters that hold up an arched entablature. The walls also have lighting sconces. The lobby's ceiling contains Adam-style bands that split the ceiling into Adam-style quadrilateral panels. Adjoining the inner lobby was a smoking room, measuring 30 by 35 feet (9.1 by 10.7 m), with an attached men's restroom. There was also a bar and a service room.

=== Auditorium ===
The auditorium has an orchestra level; two levels of boxes above the orchestra; one balcony; and a stage behind the proscenium arch. The auditorium's width is greater than its depth, and the space is designed with plaster decorations in high relief. According to the Shubert Organization, the auditorium has 1,600 seats; however, Playbill gives a different figure of 1,493 seats and The Broadway League cites 1,526 seats. There are 1,045 seats in the orchestra, 486 on the balcony, 36 in the boxes, and 33 standing-only spots. In its original configuration, the Winter Garden had 1,200 seats at orchestra level and 400 at balcony level. In addition, the original theater had 150 box seats.

The original decorative elements were designed by John Wanamaker. The theater was initially designed with latticework rather than Adam-style detailing, since latticework was commonly used as a design motif in Broadway theaters of the 1910s. The theater's name, as well as its original design, was meant to evoke an English garden.

==== Seating areas ====
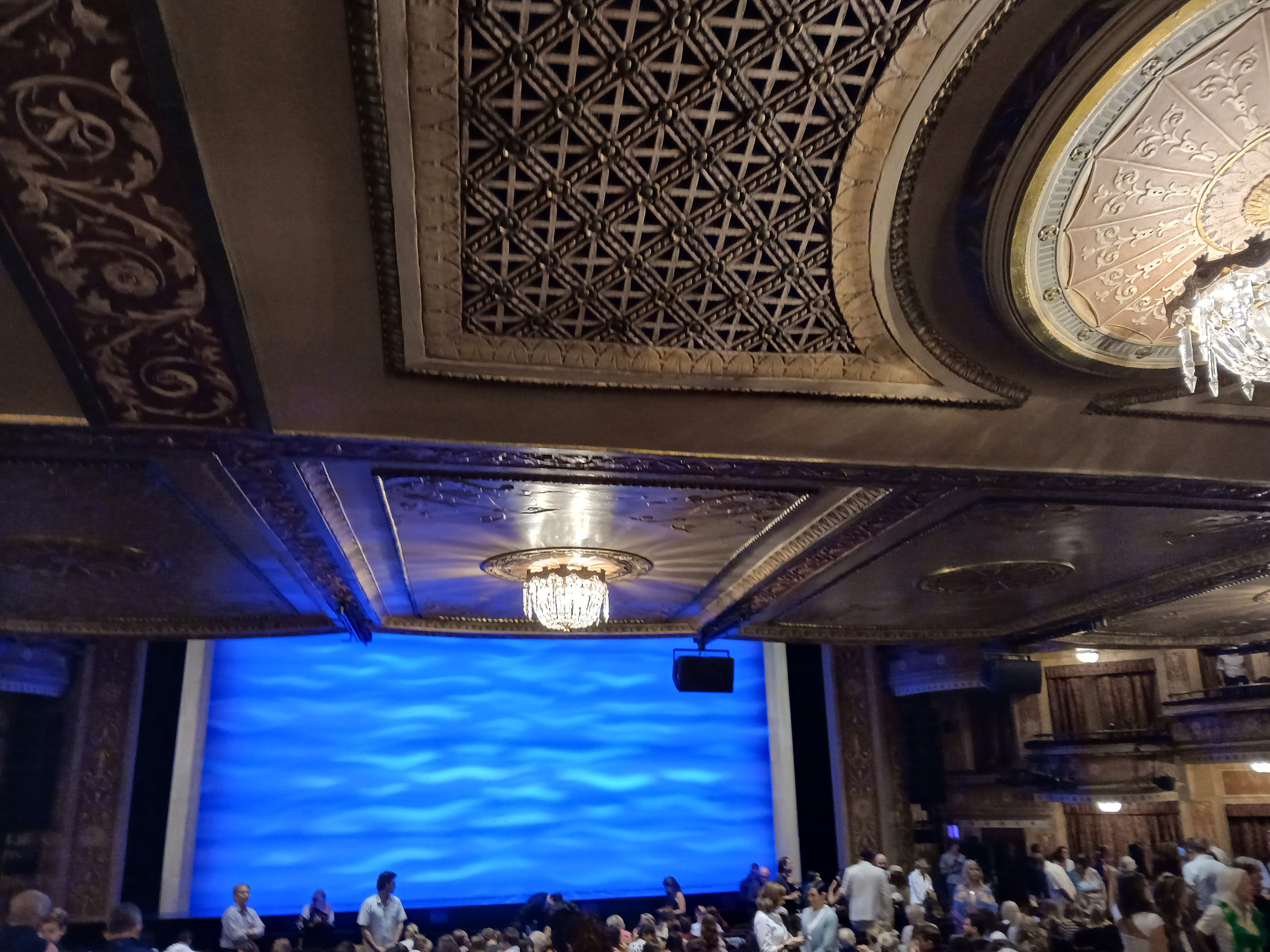
View from the rear left corner of the orchestra, looking toward the stage

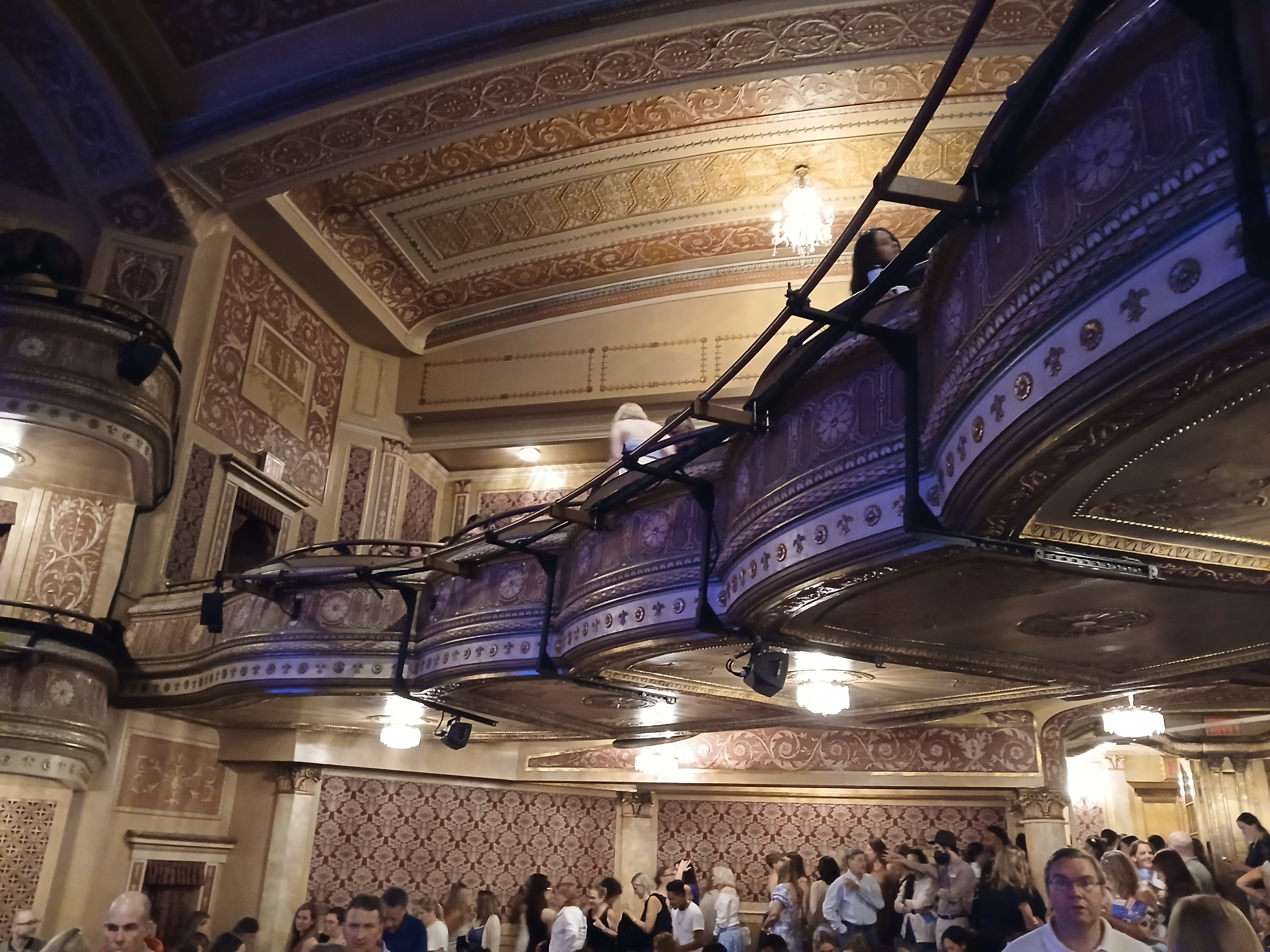
View from the orchestra, looking toward the curved railing on the right side of the balcony

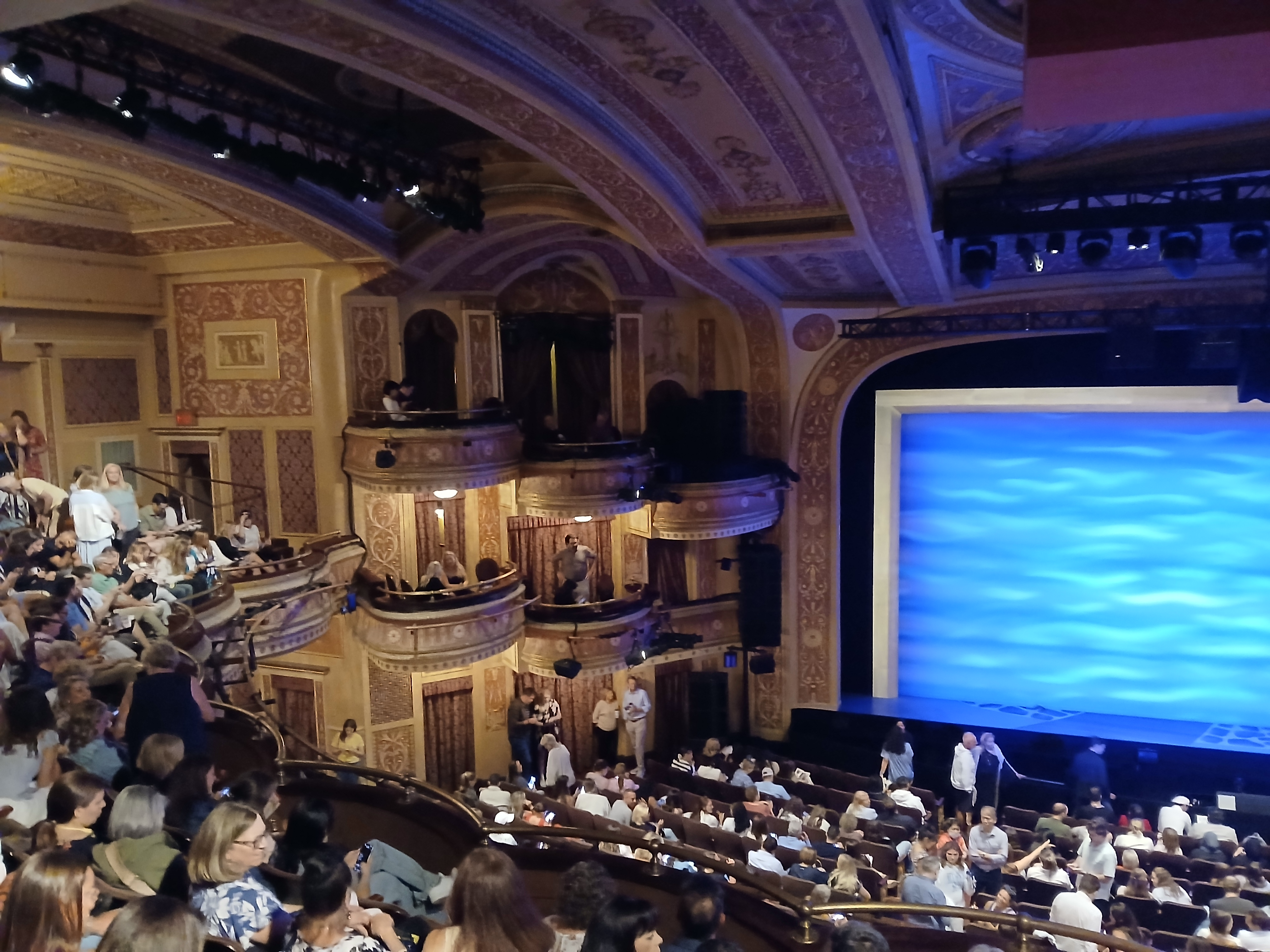
View from the balcony, looking toward the left-hand boxes. The balcony is raked, sloping down toward the stage.

The orchestra floor is raked. The rear (north) end of the orchestra contains a shallow promenade, which wraps around to the auditorium's sides. Pilasters with Corinthian capitals divide the promenade's rear wall into sections, and a cornice with dentils and modillions also runs along the wall, above the pilasters. The promenade is separated from the orchestra seating by a row of columns, also topped by Corinthian capitals. The orchestra promenade's coved ceiling is divided by Adam-style bands with foliate decorations. Each cove has circular decorative elements at their centers, which contain coffers and swags. The promenade forms part of a "grand promenade" connecting Broadway and Seventh Avenue. A standing rail is placed behind the rearmost row of seats. The orchestra level previously had 12 boxes extending along the sides of the auditorium. The walls originally contained latticework, behind which were lights. One architectural critic said that the rake of the orchestra "makes for poor visibility from most locations" due to its shallowness.

The balcony level is also raked; the front section contains several curves, which resemble the curves of boxes. The rear of the balcony level contains a promenade, which starts behind the center of the balcony and extends around to either side. This promenade was originally designed as a foyer measuring 30 by 40 feet (9.1 by 12.2 m), which had balconies overlooking Broadway. Columns separate the promenade from the balcony seating areas. The front railing of the balcony is decorated with molded bands, swags, and foliate ornament. There are lighting fixtures and other equipment in front of the railing. The underside of the balcony has Adam-style bands with foliate decorations, as well as air-conditioning vents.

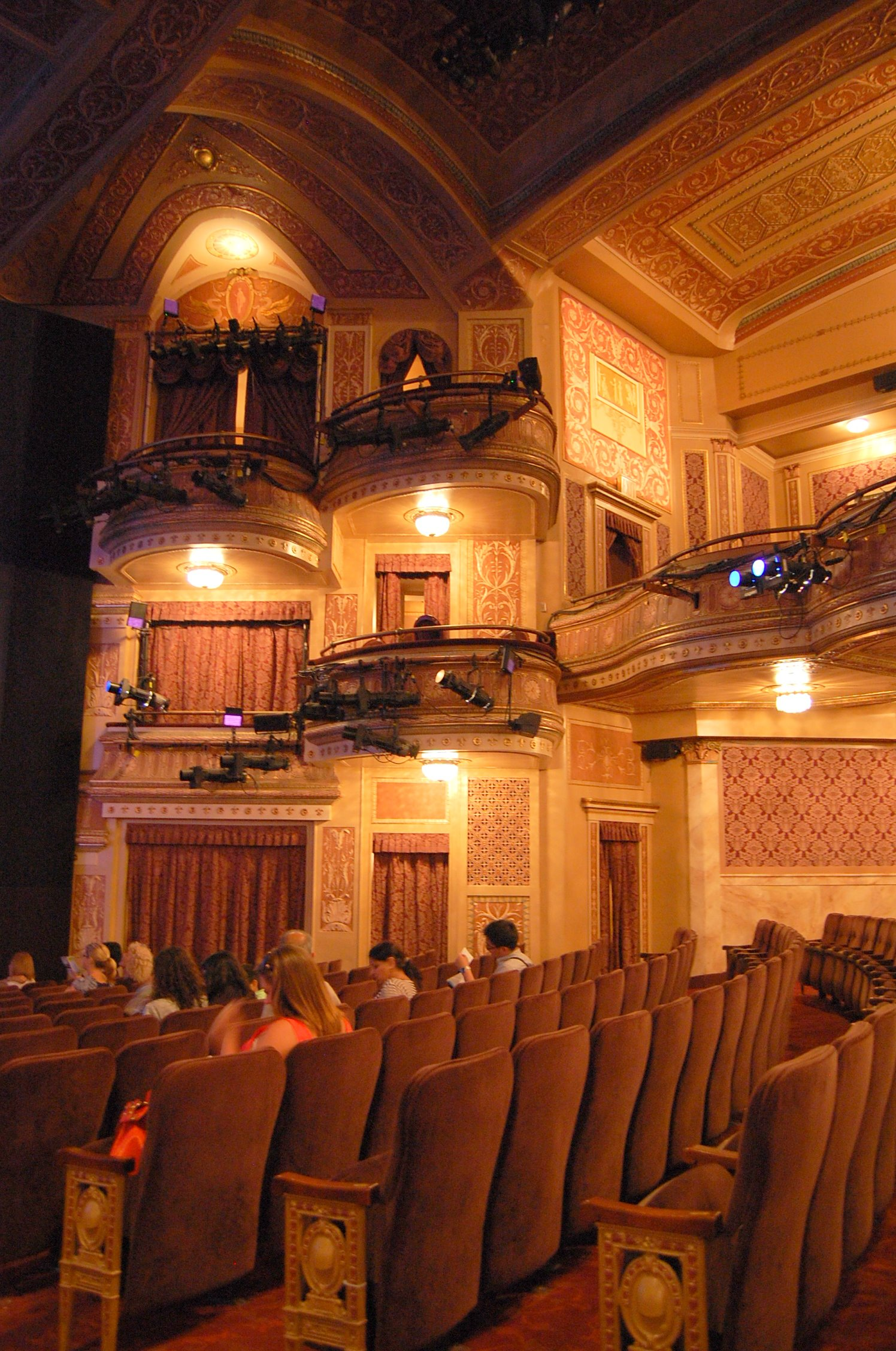
Box view

On either side of the stage is an outwardly splayed wall section with boxes at the balcony level and directly above the balcony. Both levels have three boxes on either side, which are curved outward. The fronts of the boxes have similar molded bands, swags, and foliate ornament as the balcony's front. In addition, the centers of the boxes have rosettes and oval panels. Pilasters with Adam-style decoration, running the full height of the auditorium, flank the boxes' wall sections. Each of the boxes' pilasters is topped by a Corinthian capital. There are griffin motifs and cartouches above the higher level of boxes. The present boxes and pilasters date from the 1923 renovation. The original design had only one level of boxes, which was at the balcony level. In the original design, the entire balcony front was occupied by a row of 21 boxes, and the wall sections on each side had two large party boxes, for a total of 25 boxes.

==== Other design features ====
The proscenium arch measures 24 feet 4 inches (7.42 m) high and 44 feet 10 inches (13.67 m) wide. It consists of a wide, molded band with foliated swags, rosettes, and molded figures. There are medallions within the spandrels at the corners of the arch. The present size and design of the proscenium arch dates to the 1922 renovation; an inner arch and drapes were installed to artificially reduce the original arch's size. In the proscenium's original configuration, it measured 30 feet (9.1 m) high and about 50 feet (15 m) wide. A sounding board curves onto the ceiling above the proscenium. It contains a panel that shows dancing and music-playing figures in a forest. These figures are surrounded by an Adam-style foliate band. The panel measures 30 by 40 feet (9.1 by 12.2 m) and is titled "The Shepherd's Dream".

The depth of the auditorium to the proscenium is 40 feet 0 inches (12.19 m), while the depth to the front of the stage is 44 feet 2 inches (13.46 m). When the theater originally opened, the stage had a semicircular apron with a 5-foot (1.5 m) radius, as well as a runway. (Note: According to Architecture and Building, the stage originally measured 45 feet (14 m) deep and 108 feet (33 m) deep. According to The New York Times, the stage measured 55 feet (17 m) deep and 116 feet (35 m) wide.) The runway, added in 1912, was intended to bring the performers much closer to the audience. The apron and runway were removed in the 1922 renovation, and seats were added in their place. The dressing rooms were placed in a separate structure directly behind the stage, separated from the auditorium by brick walls. There is an orchestra pit in front of and below the stage.

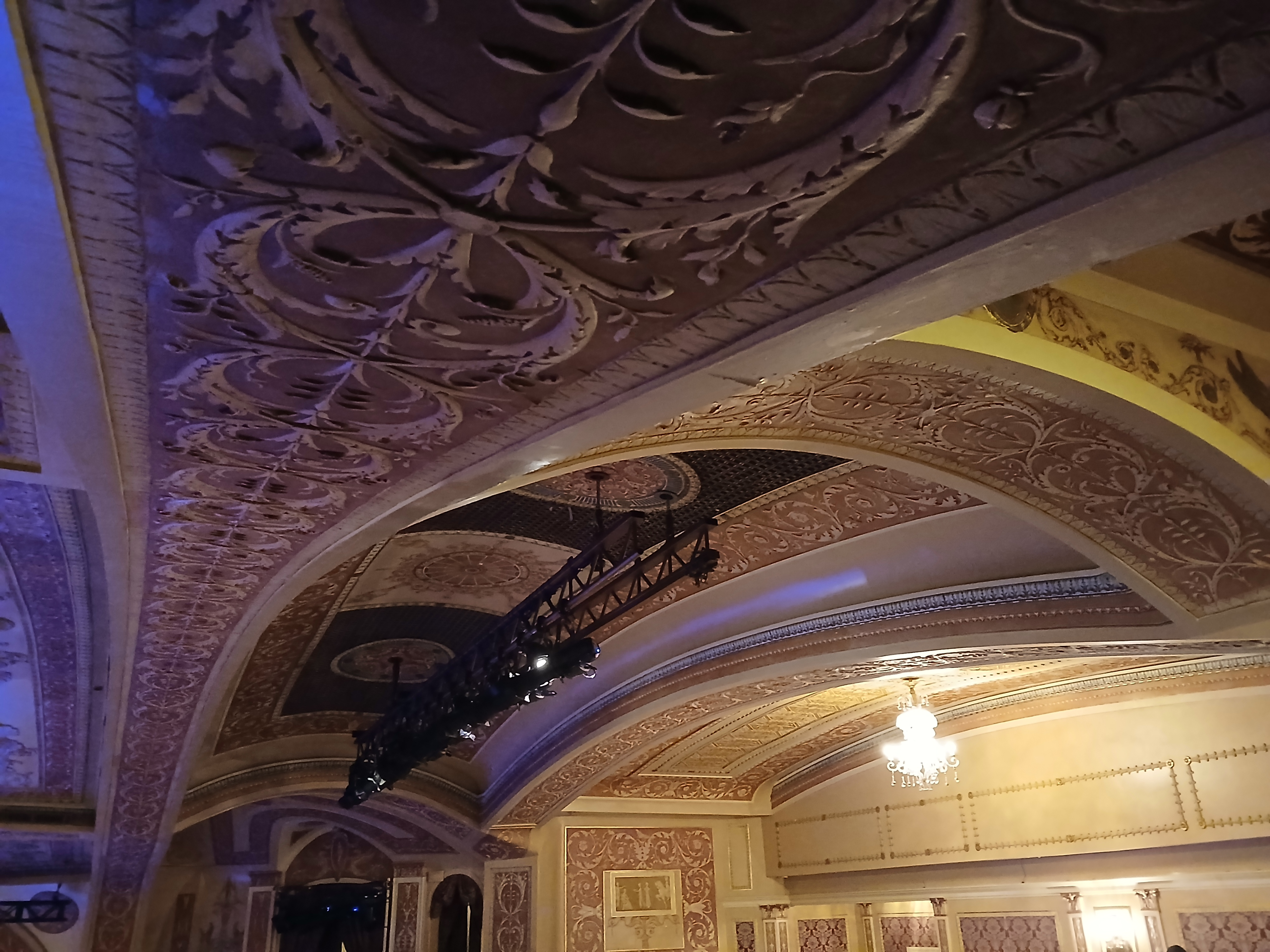
A ceiling vault, between Adam-style ribs, above the right-hand side of the balcony

The modern ceiling contains vaults, placed between ribs that are designed in the Adam style. The vaults themselves are divided into panels by Adam-style moldings and bands. The center of the ceiling contains a panel with a dome, surrounded by latticework and foliate decoration. At each of the dome's four corners, there are medallions, which depict mythical fauns playing lyres and pipes. In the theater's original design, the ceiling trusses remained exposed, a vestige of the old Horse Exchange. The ceiling was finished in wooden latticework, and the ceiling was painted blue, giving an impression of an open-air venue. The original ceiling had poor acoustics. During the 1922 renovation, Krapp had lowered the ceiling to below the trusses.

== History ==
Times Square became the epicenter for large-scale theater productions between 1900 and the Great Depression. Manhattan's theater district had begun to shift from Union Square and Madison Square during the first decade of the 20th century. From 1901 to 1920, forty-three theaters were built around Broadway in Midtown Manhattan. The Winter Garden Theatre was predated by an earlier theater of the same name, which opened in 1850 and was further downtown, at Broadway and Bond Street. The current Winter Garden was developed by the Shubert brothers of Syracuse, New York, who expanded downstate into New York City in the first decade of the 20th century. After the death of Sam S. Shubert in 1905, his brothers Lee and Jacob J. Shubert expanded their theatrical operations significantly. The brothers controlled a quarter of all plays and three-quarters of theatrical ticket sales in the U.S. by 1925.

=== Development and early years ===
==== Conversion of Horse Exchange ====
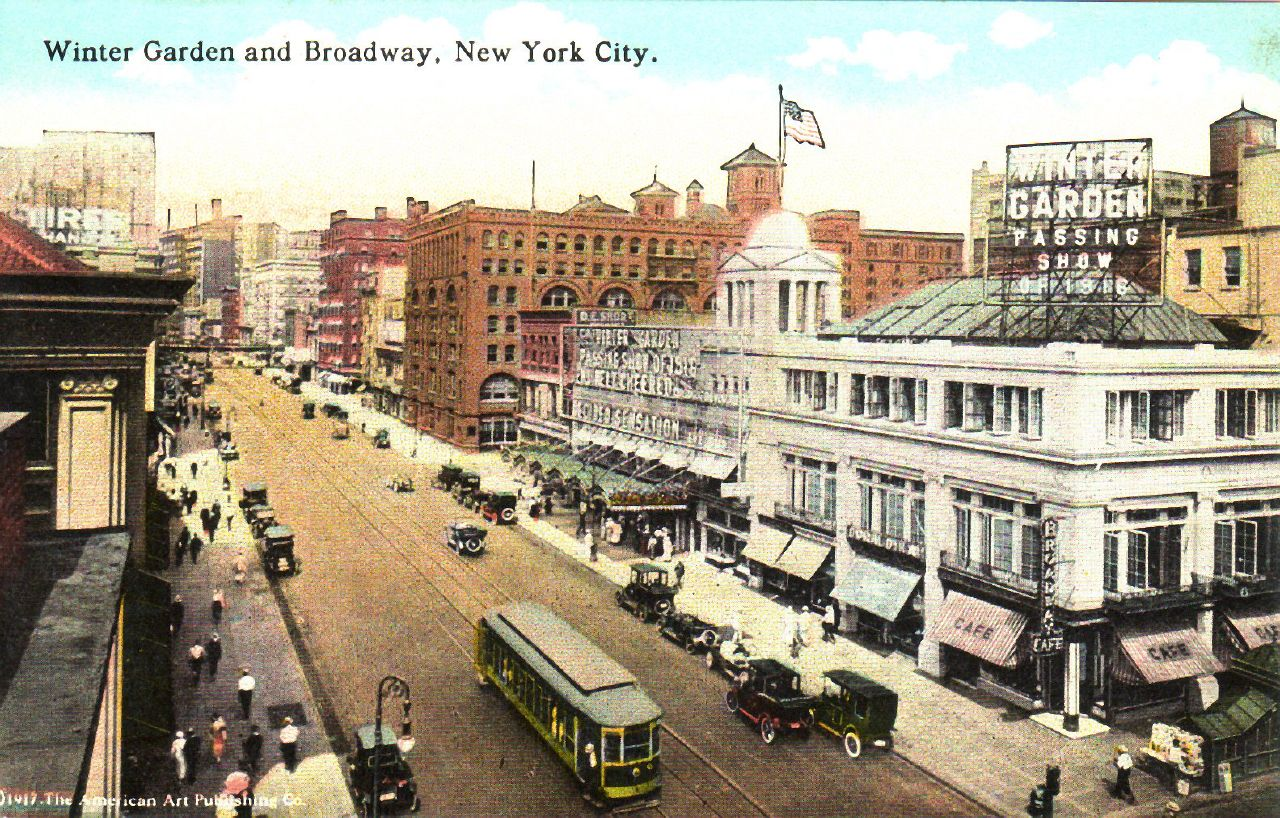
Winter Garden Theatre, 1916

Both Sam and Lee Shubert had prevented Jacob from taking a full role in the operation of the Shubert syndicate, and Lee had often sent Jacob to oversee productions outside New York City after Sam died. This prompted Jacob to develop his own theater; he subsequently recalled that, while walking up Broadway in early 1910, he looked at the Horse Exchange. Though the exchange was far north of the established Broadway theater district at the time, the raked balcony above the horse-auction ring appealed to Jacob, even after he learned that Vanderbilt was the landlord. With the horse transportation declining in favor of automobiles, Vanderbilt leased the Horse Exchange site to the Shuberts in 1910. While Vanderbilt did not want to sell, he was willing to lease the site for 40 years at an annual fee of $40,000.

The plans for the Winter Garden itself dated to December 1909, when producer Lew Fields, a close associate of Lee Shubert, was planning a music hall-style venue. Despite Fields's greater expertise, Jacob Shubert had a greater advantage; because of large expenditures, Fields became indebted to Lee and ultimately became an employee of the Shuberts. In May 1910, the Shubert brother filed plans for a theater called Lew Fields' Winter Garden, which would be built on the Horse Exchange site at a cost of $500,000. William Albert Swasey would be the architect while John McKeefrey would be the builder. The Winter Garden was originally intended to host operas, ballets, dances, and other large performances, similar to variety and music halls.

During mid-1910, while Fields was on tour, Jacob changed many of Fields's plans for the theater's physical specifications. Jacob also sent harsh letters to Fields about the latter's overspending, causing conflict between the two men. By the end of 1910, Fields had transferred his entire stake in the Winter Garden's operation to the Shubert brothers. A factor in Fields's withdrawal was Lee's lack of intervention in the dispute, implicitly favoring his less experienced brother over his longtime partner. Although Lee controlled bookings and financing, Jacob was in charge of the Winter Garden's operation. Jacob wanted the new theater to produce musical revues, in effect competing with the Ziegfeld Follies operated by Florenz Ziegfeld Jr. The Winter Garden was to be the flagship venue for the Shuberts' own productions.

==== 1910s and early 1920s ====
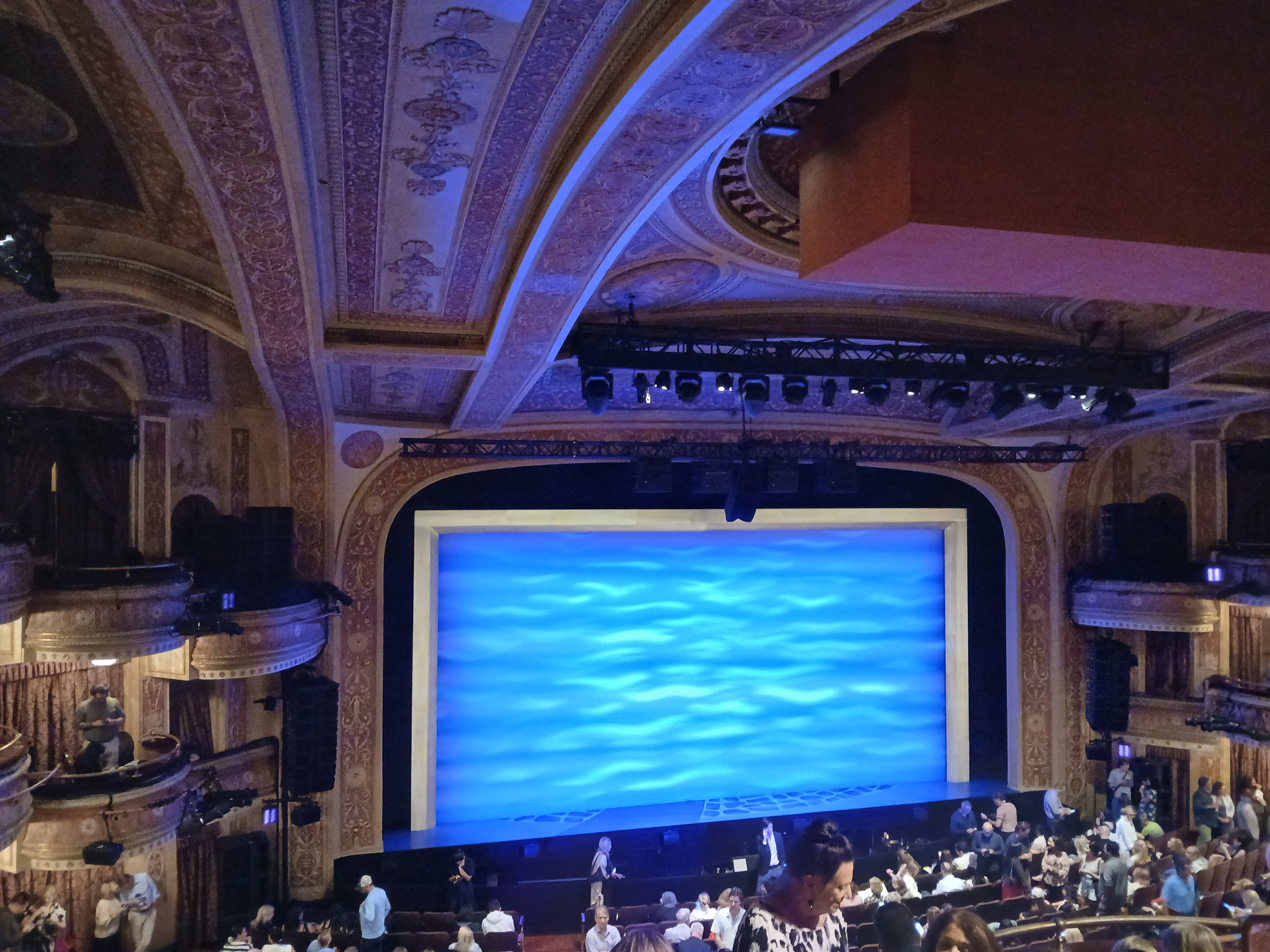
View from the mezzanine toward the stage

The Winter Garden was supposed to open at the beginning of March 1911, but ticket sales did not even begin until March 6 due to difficulties in scheduling productions. It opened on March 20, 1911, with the two-part musical La Belle Paree. The show featured the Broadway premiere of actor and singer Al Jolson. The New York Times wrote that the Winter Garden was "New York's latest plaything, a very flashy toy, full of life and go and color and with no end of jingle to it". Conversely, when flops were staged at the Winter Garden, critics said they could smell the horse stables. After La Belle Paree closed, the show Revue of Revues, featuring Gaby Deslys, opened in September 1911 and ran for two months. That November, the revue Vera Violetta opened, with numerous performers including Jolson, Deslys, and Mae West. In its early years, the Winter Garden hosted a successful series of concerts on Sunday nights, which featured performers such as Jolson. Jacob Shubert soon realized that Jolson was a major factor in the Winter Garden's success.

While on a trip to Europe, Lee had met with German producer Max Reinhardt, who had pioneered the idea of a runway extending from a stage into the audience. Lee copied Reinhardt's idea, adding a bridge above the orchestra seats. In early 1912, Jolson, Deslys, and Stella Mayhew starred in The Whirl of Society, the first show to use the Winter Garden's runway. Jolson performed near the audience on the runway, as did 80 lightly clothed showgirls, leading the runway to be nicknamed the "bridge of thighs". (From) Broadway to Paris premiered in November 1912, and Jolson, Deslys, and Fanny Brice appeared in The Honeymoon Express the next year. Jacob's son, John Shubert, subsequently recalled that after The Honeymoon Express, Jolson returned to the Winter Garden once every 18 months on average. Jolson's shows typically premiered early in the year, then went on tour after a summer break. These shows included Dancing Around (1914), Robinson Crusoe, Jr. (1916), Sinbad (1918), and Monte Cristo, Jr. (1919).

Though Jolson made the Winter Garden popular, the Shuberts had to fill the theater when Jolson was on tour. Jacob Shubert, who considered Florenz Ziegfeld as an adversary, rushed the production of his revue The Passing Show in mid-1912 after hearing that Ziegfeld was on vacation. The first edition of The Passing Show opened in July 1912. The series ran yearly through 1924, except for in 1920, when a specific edition for that year was not held. (Note: The Passing Show of 1921 technically opened at the end of 1920.) The series featured performers including Willie and Eugene Howard, Charlotte Greenwood, Marilyn Miller, Ed Wynn, Frank Fay, Fred and Adele Astaire, Marie Dressler, and Fred Allen. Jolson never appeared in any edition of The Passing Show, but the series nonetheless had notable acts such as Miller's dancing debut in 1914. In addition to Jolson's performances and The Passing Show, the Winter Garden hosted other musicals and revues. These included Cinderella on Broadway and the Broadway Brevities in 1920; The Whirl of New York in 1921; and Make It Snappy in 1922.

=== Renovation and intermittent theatrical use ===
==== 1920s ====
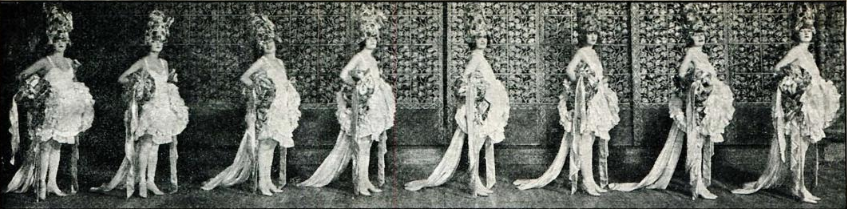
Greenwich Village Follies (1923)

In November 1922, the Winter Garden was closed for a renovation. The work was intended to make the theater suitable "more for revue than for extravaganza", as The New York Times described it. The proscenium arch was reduced in size and the ceiling was lowered under plans by Herbert Krapp. One hundred seats were installed in the former runway, and 50 boxes were added, 12 of them at orchestra level. Workers renovated the theater 24 hours a day, working in three shifts of eight hours. The theater's decorative scheme was changed to gold and white, and mulberry-colored damask panels were installed to give a perception of intimacy. Smoking, which had been allowed in the theater's early years, was banned after the 1922 renovation.

The theater reopened on January 24, 1923, with the revue The Dancing Girl, which was followed by that year's edition of The Passing Show. The end of that year saw the first edition of another revue at the Winter Garden, the Greenwich Village Follies. The Greenwich Village Follies reappeared in 1924 and 1928, and the Winter Garden also hosted the Artists and Models revue in 1925 and 1927. In addition to these revues, the musical Innocent Eyes was staged in 1924, followed by Big Boy in 1925, which was Al Jolson's last live appearance at the Winter Garden. Also presented at the Winter Garden were Gay Paree (1925 and 1926), The Great Temptations (1926), and The Circus Princess (1927). Warner Bros. took over the Winter Garden Theatre in 1928 and used it as a cinema for the next five years. The first film shown was The Singing Fool, featuring Al Jolson, which was screened in September 1928.

==== 1930s and 1940s ====
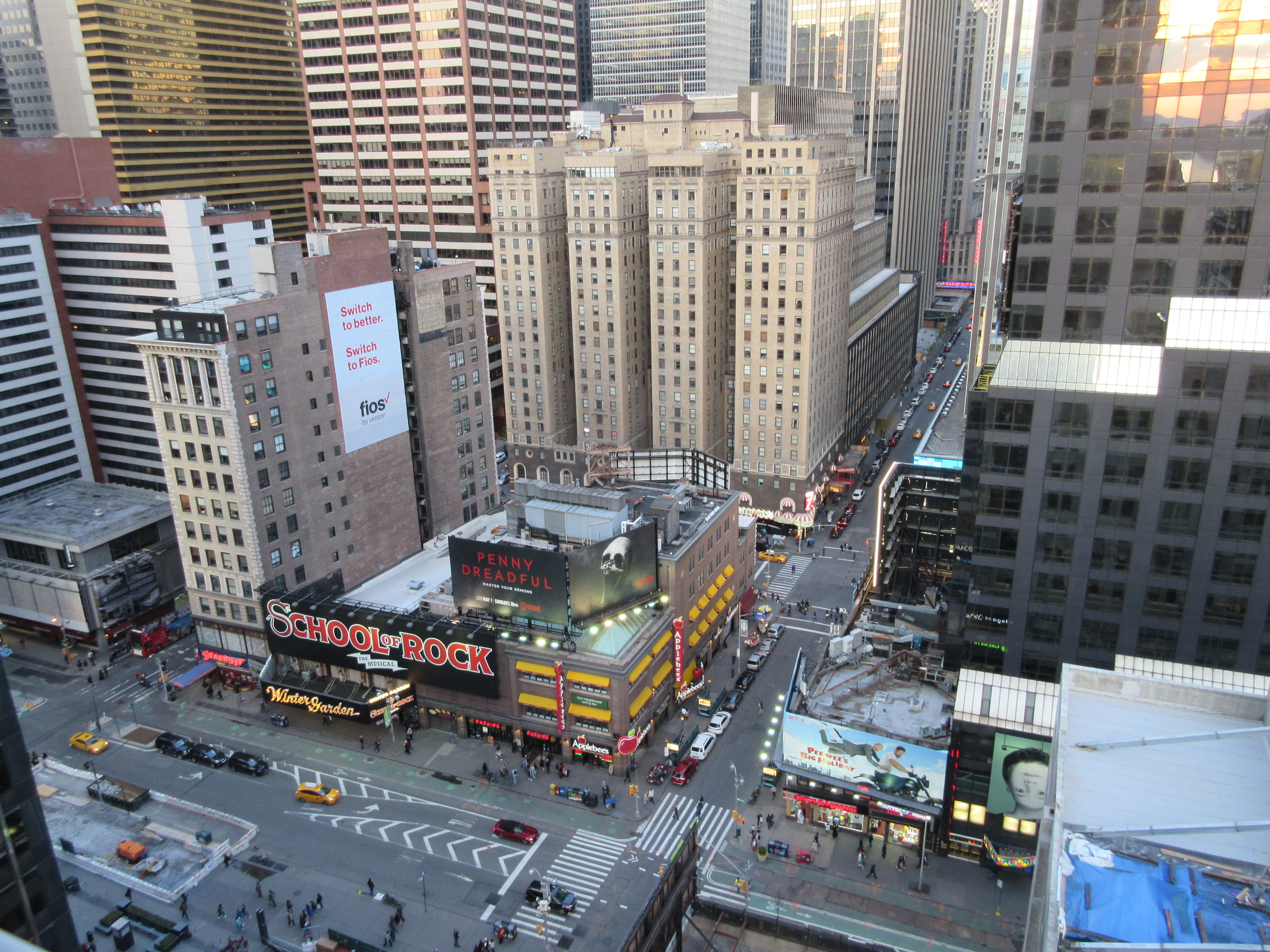
View from the west, overlooking the Winter Garden Theatre at bottom center

Warner Bros. ended its lease in 1933. After the cinema lease was terminated, the first legitimate play to be presented was Hold Your Horses, which opened in September 1933. This was followed by the 1934 edition of the Ziegfeld Follies, to which the Shuberts had acquired the rights after Florenz Ziegfeld died. Another edition of the Follies was hosted in 1936. These two editions featured performers such as Passing Show stars Willie and Eugene Howard, as well as Eve Arden, Josephine Baker, Fanny Brice, Buddy Ebsen, Bob Hope, Gypsy Rose Lee, The Nicholas Brothers, Gertrude Niesen, and Jane Pickens. Between these performances, the Winter Garden staged Life Begins at 8:40 in 1934, as well as Earl Carroll's Sketch Book and At Home Abroad in 1935.

At the end of 1936, Vincente Minnelli staged The Show Is On, a popular revue with Bert Lahr and Beatrice Lillie. This was followed the next year by Hooray for What!, an antiwar musical. The late 1930s ended with a relatively short run of You Never Know in 1938. It was succeeded the same year by a much longer run of Olsen and Johnson's revue Hellzapoppin, which had transferred from the 46th Street Theatre and ran until 1941. That year, the Shuberts staged Sons o' Fun, another Olsen and Johnson hit, which ran at the Winter Garden for over a year before transferring in 1943. The Winter Garden hosted the Ziegfeld Follies once again in 1943, with Milton Berle, Jack Cole, Ilona Massey, and Arthur Treacher. This edition of the Follies ran longer than any previous edition. This was followed in 1944 by Cole Porter's Mexican Hayride and Olsen and Johnson's Laffing Room Only.

After the operetta Marinka played in 1945, the Winter Garden again became a cinema for three years. United Artists started negotiating for the rights to use the Winter Garden for motion pictures in August 1945, but there were disputes over sound equipment. An agreement was reached later that month, with United Artists taking over that October. By the end of 1947, United Artists struggled to find films to screen, and it was paying $7,500 a week in rent. As the Girls Go, which opened in November 1948, was the first production to be staged after the Winter Garden again became a legitimate theater. The production, by Michael Todd, charged a top admission price of $7.20, which at the time was a record.

=== Dedicated theatrical use ===
==== 1950s to 1970s ====
Michael Todd staged Michael Todd's Peep Show, a burlesque, in 1950. This was followed by the satire Top Banana in 1951, with Phil Silvers; the musical Wonderful Town in 1953, with Rosalind Russell; and a revival of Peter Pan in 1954. The 16th-century classic Tamburlaine The Great was staged at the Winter Garden in 1956. The Old Vic, a theater company from London, arrived the same year, presenting several Shakespeare plays. (Note: These include King Richard II, Romeo and Juliet, Macbeth, and Troilus and Cressida.) The last Ziegfeld Follies at the Winter Garden was staged in 1957, featuring Beatrice Lillie and Billy De Wolfe, but it was not as successful as previous versions, closing after 123 performances. Later that year, the Winter Garden premiered the musical West Side Story featuring Carol Lawrence, with music by Leonard Bernstein and Stephen Sondheim, the latter of whom was making his Broadway debut as a lyricist. The Winter Garden's last productions of the 1950s were Juno and Saratoga in 1959.

West Side Story returned to the Winter Garden briefly in 1960, having transferred the previous year. This was followed later that year by The Unsinkable Molly Brown with Tammy Grimes, which ran 732 performances. Eddie Fisher had a month-long engagement, Eddie Fisher at the Winter Garden, during late 1962. For much of the rest of the decade, the Winter Garden presented two hits. Funny Girl, with Barbra Streisand, opened in 1964 and ran for two years before transferring. It was followed by Mame, with Angela Lansbury and Bea Arthur, which opened in 1966 and ran for three years.

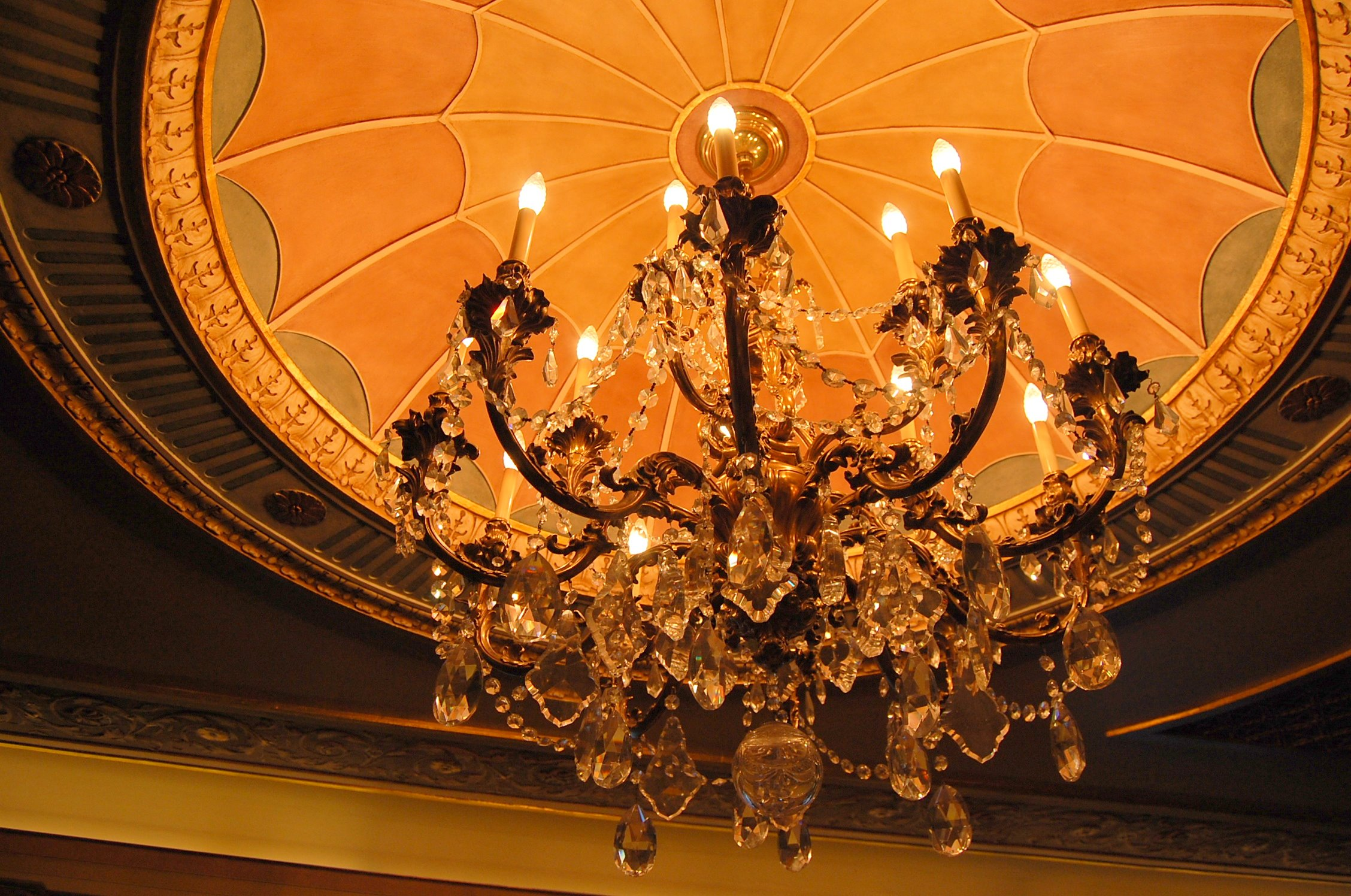
Lobby interior

The first hit of the 1970s was Stephen Sondheim and James Goldman's musical Follies, which opened in 1971. This was followed the next year by a revival of Much Ado About Nothing, produced by the New York Shakespeare Festival and featuring Sam Waterston and Kathleen Widdoes. In addition, Neil Diamond performed a series of solo concerts in October 1972, and Liza Minnelli performed in a concert run in January 1974. A revival of the Sondheim musical Gypsy, featuring Lansbury, was staged later in 1974, and the Winter Garden hosted the 29th Tony Awards the following year. Yet another Sondheim musical, Pacific Overtures, was staged at the Winter Garden in 1976. It was followed the same year by a series of concerts by Natalie Cole, as well as a 167-performance run of Fiddler on the Roof. The musical Beatlemania opened in 1977 and ran for two years, despite initial expectations of bad reviews.

==== 1980s and 1990s ====
In the late 1970s and early 1980s, the Winter Garden was used mostly for several minor shows and live appearances. This included Zoot Suit in early 1979, followed in June by Bruce Forsyth concerts and in August by Gilda Radner's Live From New York appearances. Next to be staged, in 1980, was Twyla Tharp's dance series. The musical 42nd Street premiered later in 1980, though the opening of the musical coincided with the death of its director, Gower Champion. This was followed by Camelot in 1981 and a revival of Othello in 1982. During the 1980s, the Shuberts renovated the Winter Garden as part of a restoration program for their Broadway theaters.

Andrew Lloyd Webber's musical Cats had been booked for the Winter Garden in April 1982, with a premiere scheduled for that October. In mid-1982, the Shuberts closed the Winter Garden Theatre for a major renovation of both the exterior and the interior. The auditorium was gutted to accommodate the show's junkyard setting, under the supervision of designer John Napier. In addition, the interior was painted black, as was the billboard outside. Cats opened on October 7, 1982, and quickly became successful, winning multiple Tony Awards. Cats became the longest-running Broadway show in history in June 1997, when it hit 6,138 performances. Ultimately, Cats ran 7,485 performances spanning nearly eighteen years.

The New York City Landmarks Preservation Commission (LPC) had started considering protecting the Winter Garden as an official city landmark in 1982, with discussions continuing over the next several years. Though both the exterior and interior were considered, the LPC designated only the interior as a landmark in January 1988. This was part of the LPC's wide-ranging effort to grant landmark status to Broadway theaters, which had commenced in 1987. The New York City Board of Estimate ratified the designations in March 1988. The Shuberts, the Nederlanders, and Jujamcyn collectively sued the LPC in June 1988 to overturn the landmark designations of 22 theaters, including the Winter Garden, on the merit that the designations severely limited the extent to which the theaters could be modified. The lawsuit was escalated to the New York Supreme Court and the Supreme Court of the United States, but these designations were ultimately upheld in 1992.

==== 2000s to present ====
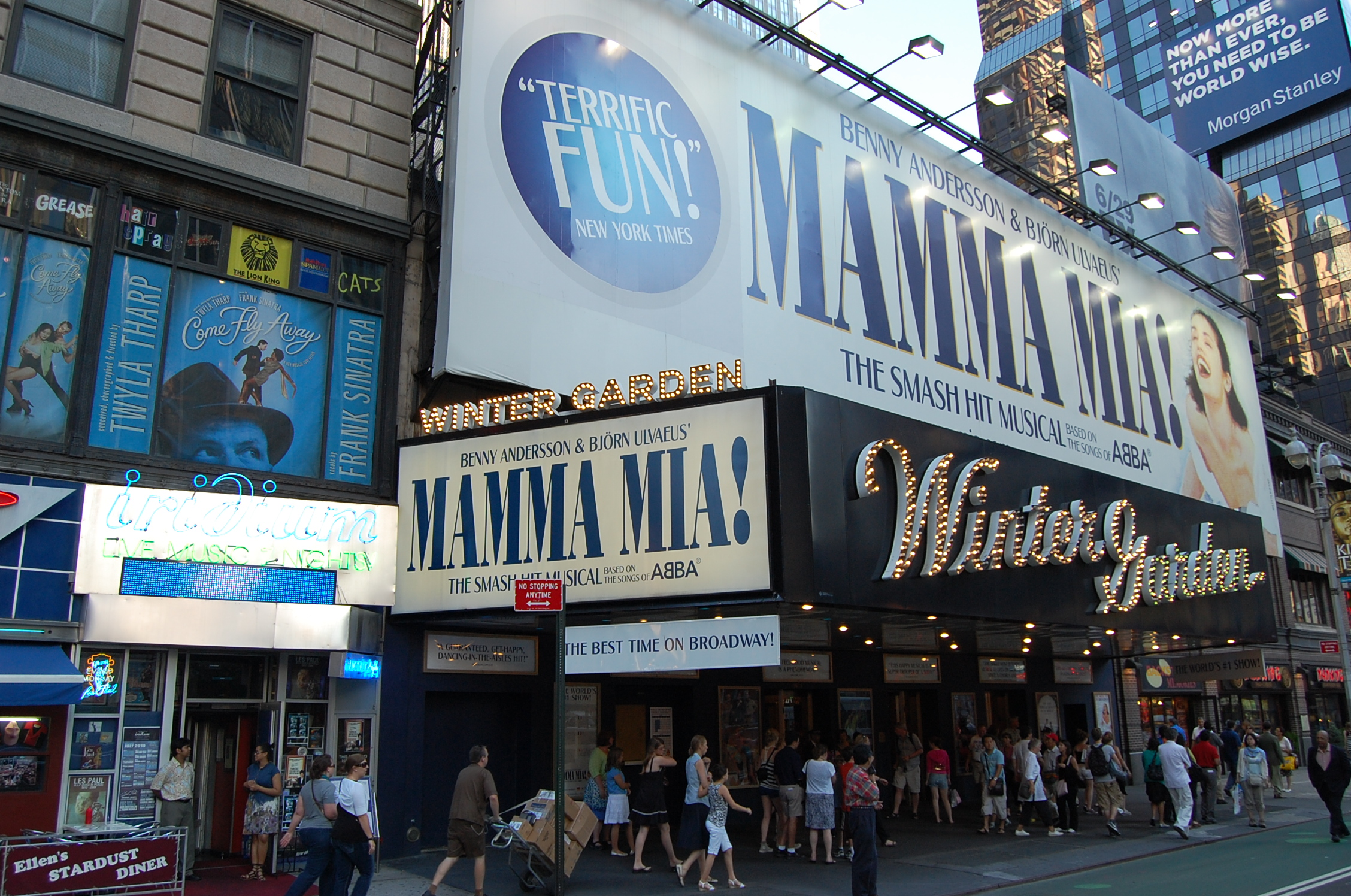
The Broadway facade seen during the original run of Mamma Mia!

In 2000, the Shubert Organization and General Motors (GM) began discussions over a possible sponsorship, in which the Winter Garden could be rebranded for Cadillac, a division of GM. Early the same year, theatrical media announced that Cats would close that June, having played to more than 10 million guests and grossing over $380 million. Cats closed on September 10, 2000, and objects from the production were auctioned at the Winter Garden. Afterward, architect Francesca Russo restored the theater to its 1920s appearance. The $10 million project entailed restoring many of the architectural features that had been heavily modified for Cats, as well as restoring the lobby, lounges, seats, and ticket areas. Historical design features, such as light fixtures and plasterwork, were restored or replaced. The stage, which had been disassembled for the run of Cats, also had to be reconstructed.

Mamma Mia! was booked for the Winter Garden shortly after Cats closed, with a premiere in October 2001. Following the Shuberts' discussions with GM, the theater was renamed the Cadillac Winter Garden Theatre in May 2002. As part of a settlement with the United States Department of Justice in 2003, the Shuberts agreed to improve disabled access at their 16 landmarked Broadway theaters, including the Winter Garden. At the beginning of 2007, GM's sponsorship ended and the venue returned to its original name. Mamma Mia! was similarly long-running, transferring to the Broadhurst in 2013 to make way for Rocky the Musical. Rocky opened in 2014 and ran for 188 performances. This was followed in 2015 by a short run of Wolf Hall Parts One & Two, as well as a much longer run of School of Rock, which closed in early 2019 after over 1,300 performances. Beetlejuice opened in April 2019, but the Shuberts announced the same December that Beetlejuice would be relocated to make way for a revival of Meredith Willson's The Music Man.

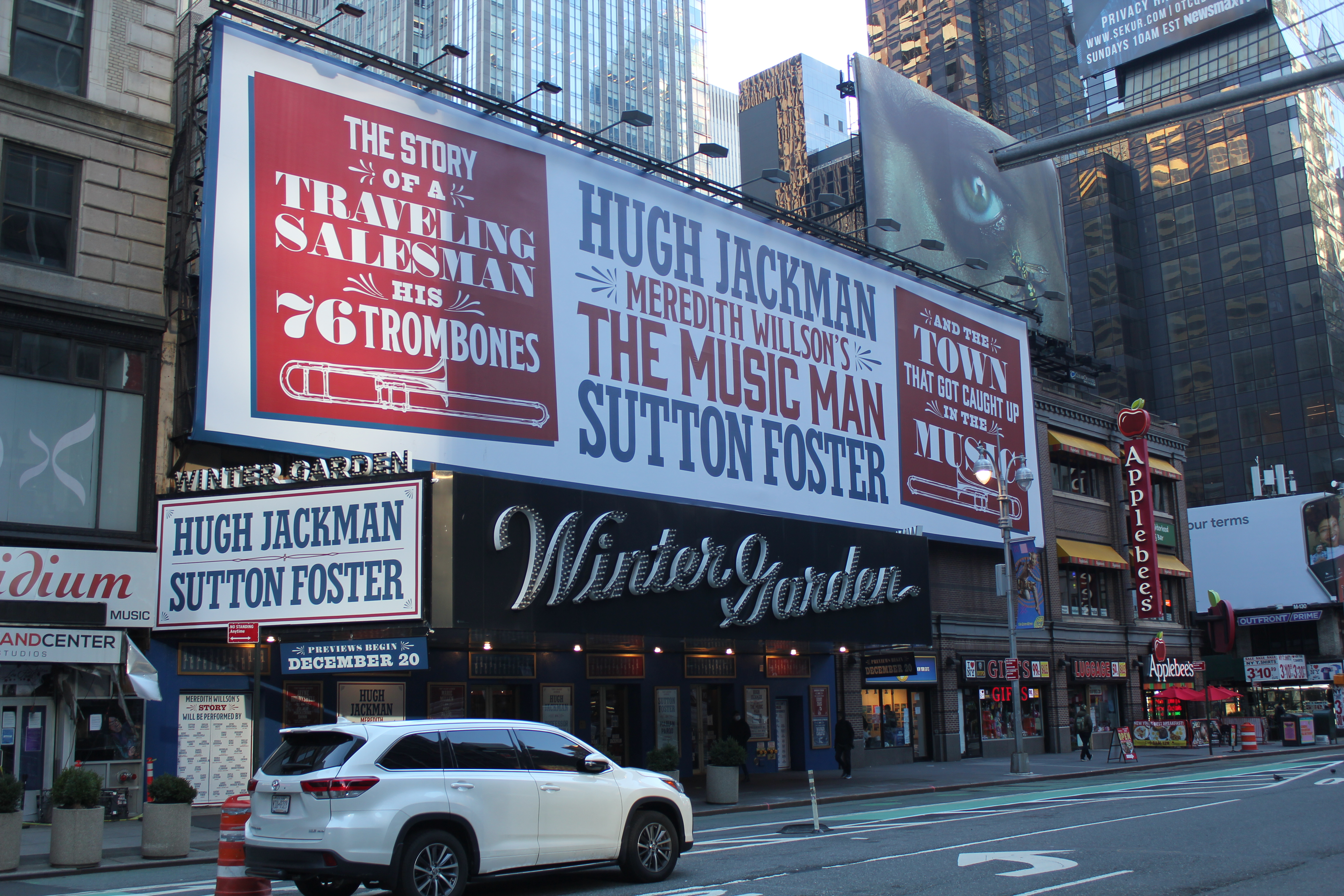
The 2022 Broadway revival of The Music Man playing at the theatre

All Broadway theaters temporarily closed on March 12, 2020, due to the COVID-19 pandemic. Beetlejuice's run, which had been scheduled to end that June, ended prematurely due to an extension of the COVID-19 closure. The musical eventually relocated to the Marquis Theatre in 2022. During its closure, a stagehand at the Winter Garden died after falling while taking down props for Beetlejuice in November 2020; the Occupational Safety and Health Administration fined the Shuberts as a result. The theater also hosted the 74th Tony Awards in September 2021. The Winter Garden reopened on December 20, 2021, with previews of The Music Man, which officially opened in February 2022. The production ran for 374 performances through January 2023. Back to the Future: The Musical opened at the theater in August 2023 and closed in January 2025 after 597 performances. This was followed by a two-month run of the stage adaptation of the film Good Night, and Good Luck in 2025, starring George Clooney; Good Night, and Good Luck set the theater's box office record, grossing $4,238,813 over eight performances during the week of May 19–25, 2025. A six-month-long revival of Mamma Mia! opened at the Winter Garden in August 2025. This was followed by a 14-week revival of Death of a Salesman, which opened in April 2026. The 2025 West End revival of Much Ado About Nothing opened November 2026 at the Winter Garden for a run scheduled through January 2027. This will be followed by the transfer of the 2025 West End revival of Evita with an opening scheduled for March 2027.

== Notable productions ==
Productions are listed by the year of their first performance. Shows that have had multiple editions are listed by the year of the first performance of each edition. This list only includes Broadway shows; it does not include films.

Notable productions at the theater
Opening year	Name	Refs.
1911	La Belle Paree	
1911	Vera Violetta	
1912–24	The Passing Show	(Note: Including The Passing Show of 1916)
1916	Robinson Crusoe, Jr.	
1918	Sinbad	
1919	Monte Cristo, Jr.	
1920	Broadway Brevities of 1920	
1921	The Whirl of New York	
1922	Make It Snappy	
1923	Greenwich Village Follies of 1923	
1924	Bombo	
1924	Innocent Eyes	
1924	Greenwich Village Follies of 1924	
1925	Big Boy	
1925	Sky High	
1925	Artists and Models of 1925	
1927	The Circus Princess	
1927	A Night in Spain	
1927	Artists and Models of 1927	
1928	Greenwich Village Follies of 1928	
1934	Ziegfeld Follies of 1934	
1934	Life Begins at 8:40	
1935	At Home Abroad	
1936	Ziegfeld Follies of 1936	
1937	Hooray for What!	
1938	You Never Know	
1938	Hellzapoppin	
1941	Sons o' Fun	
1943	Ziegfeld Follies of 1943	
1944	Mexican Hayride	
1944	Laffing Room Only	
1945	Marinka	
1948	As the Girls Go	
1950	Alive and Kicking	
1950	Michael Todd's Peep Show	
1951	Make a Wish	
1951	Top Banana	
1952	My Darlin' Aida	
1953	Wonderful Town	
1954	Peter Pan	
1955	Plain and Fancy	
1955	The Vamp	
1956	Tamburlaine The Great	
1956	Bus Stop	
1956	Shangri-La	
1957	Ziegfeld Follies of 1957	
1957	West Side Story	(Note: West Side Story premiered in 1957 and was revived in 1960.)
1959	Juno	
1959	Saratoga	
1960	Once Upon a Mattress	
1960	The Unsinkable Molly Brown	
1962	All American	
1962	Carnival!	
1963	The Lady of the Camellias	
1963	Tovarich	
1964	Funny Girl	
1966	Mame	
1969	Jimmy!	
1970	Georgy	
1970	Purlie	
1971	Follies	
1972	Much Ado About Nothing	
1974	Ulysses in Nighttown	
1974	Gypsy	
1975	Doctor Jazz	
1976	Pacific Overtures	
1976	Fiddler on the Roof	
1977	Beatlemania	
1979	Zoot Suit	
1979	Gilda Radner: Live From New York	
1980	42nd Street	
1981	The Catherine Wheel	
1981	Camelot	
1982	Othello	
1982	Cats	
2001	Mamma Mia!	
2014	Rocky the Musical	
2015	Wolf Hall Parts One & Two	
2015	School of Rock	
2019	Beetlejuice	
2022	The Music Man	
2023	Back to the Future: The Musical	
2025	Good Night, and Good Luck	
2025	Mamma Mia!	
2026	Death of a Salesman	
2026	Much Ado About Nothing	
2027	Evita	

== See also ==
- List of buildings and structures on Broadway in Manhattan
- List of Broadway theaters
- List of New York City Designated Landmarks in Manhattan from 14th to 59th Streets
