= Harold Atteridge =

American lyricist and librettist (1886–1938)

Harold Richard Atteridge (July 9, 1886 – January 15, 1938) was an American lyricist and librettist, primarily for musicals and revues. He wrote the book and lyrics for over 20 musicals and revues for the Shubert family, including several iterations of The Passing Show.

== Biography ==
Atteridge was born in Lake Forest, Illinois, the only child of Richard H. Atteridge and Ann T. O'Neill. He attended North Division High School, followed by college at the University of Chicago, where he was a member of the Phi Kappa Psi fraternity. In 1907 he wrote the Varsity show for the Black Friar's Club, and graduated with a Bachelor of Philosophy degree. His obituary quoted him on experience: "If my success at this work illustrates anything it marks the importance of making an early start at one's profession. ... All during college I was developing a revue and musical show technique in my work for a college organization called the Black Friars. By the time I received my Bachelor of Philosophy degree I was a fairly proficient librettist."

His professional career began in Chicago as a lyricist for a music publishing firm. He first gained attention by writing the lyrics for two songs in the Chicago production of Madame Sherry. Producer George Lederer showed enthusiasm and advised Atteridge to move to New York. He did so in September 1910. He met with Jesse Louis Lasky who engaged him for a show at the New York Folies Bergère. When that venue closed, and with a letter of introduction to J. J. Shubert, Atteridge auditioned some of his songs and was engaged to write for the Shuberts' productions. Over the next two decades, he wrote dozens of shows, often writing both book and lyrics, for Broadway, including many starring Al Jolson, and several reviews in the successful series called The Passing Show.

Atteridge married his first wife, Laura, in 1912. He married his second wife, Mary Teresa Corless, on May 1, 1923.

By 1930 he was working in Hollywood, writing film continuities. Later he wrote radio continuities for Al Jolson and Ed Wynn.

Atteridge died on January 15, 1938, of cirrhosis of the liver in Lynbrook, New York. He was survived by his wife.

== Working methods ==
In a 1914 interview, Atteridge spoke of the process of writing a revue.

Writing a Winter Garden revue involves many details, and this work is unlike that of the librettist who writes a straight musical comedy. It must be remembered that there are more principals for whom parts and song numbers must be arranged, and that, due to the nature of travesties indulged in, constant revisions are necessary up until the very week before the premiere.

Seven or eight weeks ahead I have a private conference with J. J. Shubert, who engages the cast and chorus, plans the scenery and lighting effects, and superintends the production and together we map out a skeleton idea of the forthcoming revue. Then we scout about for a promising composer, and I begin writing a series of lyrics to be used. In the average Winter Garden offering about thirty-five numbers are written, and ten songs from this list are eliminated before the premiere.

Rehearsals of the principals start at least four weeks in advance, the chorus beginning a fortnight earlier under the supervision of a dancing director. As soon as rehearsals are progressing the weeding out process begins. Certain lines must be eliminated and scenes built up; new entertainers are engaged and special parts must be written at short notice for them; a turn in the Mexican situation, politics, woman suffrage, eugenics, or any other much-discussed current topic, necessitates a re-arrangement of certain travesty material.

I attend every rehearsal and am always on hand to follow out suggestions from whoever happens to be staging the production. At the first dress rehearsal, and there are usually three or four because the Winter Garden productions open in New York without a preliminary tryout. The show is of at least five hours' duration. The weak spots are bolstered up, certain song numbers that lack the necessary dash and spirit are eliminated, and the entire programme routine condensed and rearranged. The length is gradually cut down for the opening night.

I do most of my writing between the hours of midnight and 5 AM. I write in long hand under an electric desk lamp, and always alone. Most of the comedy dialogue that I write for the Winter Garden revues I observe in every day life – on the subway, in restaurants, on the street, in hotel lobbies, at church, in barber shops, in business offices, and most any place where ordinary people are to be seen. During the day I watch persons and at night I write about them. It usually takes me from thirty minutes to an hour to write the finished lyrics for a song. I read all the newspapers every day and this afford me a field of current information. The winter Garden revues, especially the annual Passing Show, is a resumé of theatrical, business, and political topics of the past season set to song, dance and laughter.

Recalling the creation of one of the songs for which he is best known, he said, "Coming downtown on the subway the other evening I scribbled on the back of an envelope the lyrics of a one-step, 'By the Beautiful Sea', and handed them that night to Harry Carroll. ... Carroll immediately wrote a melody for the words and now the tune is proving a favorite at local dance palaces, cabarets, and restaurants. Which goes to show that one can accomplish things of real value during otherwise idle moments."

== List of works ==
=== Stage works for Broadway ===
- The Orchid (1907) additional lyrics contributed for Broadway production
- Madame Sherry (1910) lyrics
- The Happiest Night of His Life (1911) lyrics
- Vera Violetta (1911) book and lyrics
- A Night with the Pierrots / Sesostra / The Whirl of Society (1912) lyrics
- Two Little Brides (1912) lyrics
- (From) Broadway to Paris (1912) book and lyrics
- The Man with Three Wives (1913) book and lyrics
- The Honeymoon Express (1913) lyrics
- The Passing Show of 1913 (1913) book and lyrics
- The Whirl of the World (1914) book and lyrics
- The Passing Show of 1914 (1914) book and lyrics
- Dancing Around (1914) book and lyrics
- Maid in America (1915) book and lyrics
- The Peasant Girl (1915) lyrics
- The Passing Show of 1915 (1915) book and lyrics
- Hands Up (1915) additional lyrics
- The Blue Paradise (1915) additional lyrics
- A World of Pleasure (1915) book and lyrics
- Ruggles of Red Gap (1915) lyrics
- Robinson Crusoe, Jr. (1916) lyrics
- The Passing Show of 1916 (1916) book and lyrics
- The Show of Wonders (1916) book and lyrics
- The Passing Show of 1917 (1917) book and lyrics
- Doing Our Bit (1917) book and lyrics
- Over the Top (1917) book
- Sinbad (1918) book and lyrics
- Follow the Girl (1918) additional lyrics
- The Passing Show of 1918 (1918) book and lyrics
- Monte Cristo, Jr. (1919) book and lyrics
- Shubert Gaieties of 1919 (1919) book
- The Passing Show of 1919 (1919) book and lyrics
- The Little Blue Devil (1919) book and lyrics
- Cinderella on Broadway (1920) book and lyrics
- The Passing Show of 1921 (1920) book and lyrics
- The Midnight Rounders of 1921 (1921) book
- The Last Waltz (1921) book and lyrics (English version)
- The Mimic World (1921) book and lyrics
- Bombo (1921) book and lyrics
- The Rose of Stamboul (1922) book and lyrics
- Make It Snappy (1922) book and lyrics
- The Passing Show of 1922 (1922) book and lyrics
- The Dancing Girl (1923) book and lyrics
- The Passing Show of 1923 (1923) book and lyrics
- Topics of 1923 (1923) book and lyrics
- Innocent Eyes (1924) book and lyrics
- Marjorie (1924) book and lyrics
- The Dream Girl (1924) book and additional lyrics
- The Passing Show of 1924 (1924) book and lyrics
- Big Boy (1925) book
- Sky High (1925) book and lyrics
- Artists and Models (1925) book
- Gay Paree (1925) book and additional lyrics
- A Night in Paris (1926) book
- The Great Temptations (1926) book
- A Night in Spain (1927) book
- Ziegfeld Follies of 1927 (1927) book
- The Greenwich Village Follies (1928) book, additional lyrics
- Pleasure Bound (1929) book and lyrics
- Thumbs Up! (1934) book

=== Film work ===
- The Ladies Man (1928) story
- Her Golden Calf (1930) dialogue
- Big Boy (1930) play
- Poppin' the Cork (1933) dialogue
