= 1918 in music =

This is a list of notable events in music that took place in the year 1918.

== Specific locations ==
- 1918 in British music
- 1918 in Norwegian music

== Specific genres ==
- 1918 in country music
- 1918 in jazz

== Events ==
- January 18 – The Historic Concert for the Benefit of Widows and Orphans of Austrian and Hungarian Soldiers at the Konzerthaus, Vienna.

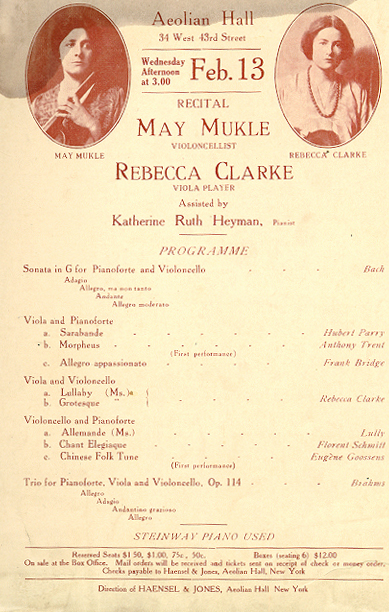
Programme for Rebecca Clarke's recital at the Aeolian Hall

- February 13 – May Mukle and Rebecca Clarke give a recital at the Aeolian Hall in New York City, accompanied by Marjorie Hayward, performing works by Hubert Parry, Frank Bridge, and Clarke herself. It includes the premiėre of Morpheus, written by Clarke under the pen-name "Anthony Trent".
- March 3 – Béla Bartók's String Quartet No. 2 is premièred in Budapest.
- April 30 – May 1 – Composer Toivo Kuula is mortally wounded in the Finnish Civil War.
- August – King Oliver leaves New Orleans for Chicago.
- September 28 – First performance of Igor Stravinsky's Histoire du Soldat, conducted by Ernest Ansermet, in Lausanne, Switzerland.
- September 29 – First performance of Gustav Holst's orchestral suite The Planets, before an invited audience at the Queen's Hall in London, conducted by Adrian Boult.
- October 16 – Premiere of Kōsaku Yamada's Choreographic Symphony "Maria Magdalena" in Carnegie Hall conducted by the composer.
- November 15 – Rosa Ponselle makes her Metropolitan Opera début as Leonora in Verdi's La forza del destino, opposite Enrico Caruso.
- November 30 – Ernest Ansermet conducts the first concert by the Orchestre de la Suisse Romande.
- Ralph Vaughan Williams is appointed Director of Music, First Army (United Kingdom).
- First documented racially integrated jazz recording session.
- Worldwide sales of phonograph/gramophone records estimated at 100 million records this year.

== Bands formed ==
- Goldman Band founded by Edwin Franko Goldman

== Published popular music ==
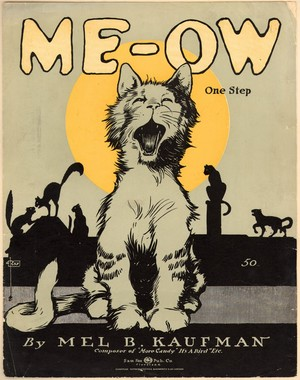

- "After You've Gone" w. Henry Creamer m. Turner Layton
- "All Aboard for Home Sweet Home" w.m. Addison Burkhardt. Al Piantadosi and Jack Glogau
- "Bagdad" w. Harold Atteridge m. Al Jolson
- "Beautiful Ohio" w. Ballard MacDonald m. Mary Earl
- "Clarinet Marmalade" m. Edwin B. Edwards, Nick LaRocca, Tony Spargo & Larry Shields
- "The Daughter Of Rosie O'Grady" w. Monty C. Brice m. Walter Donaldson
- "Dear Little Boy of Mine" w. J. Keirn Brennan m. Ernest R. Ball
- "Dear Old Pal of Mine" w. Harold Robe m. Lt. Gitz Rice
- "Ding Dong" w.m. Irving Berlin
- "Don't Let Us Sing Anymore About War, Just Let Us Sing of Love (Peace Song)" w.m. Harry Lauder
- "Every Day" by Shelton Brooks
- "Ev'rybody's Crazy 'bout the Doggone Blues, But I'm Happy" by Henry Creamer and Turner Layton
- "Everybody's Happy Now" m. James Kendis & James Brockman & Nat Vincent
- "Everything Is Peaches Down In Georgia" w. Grant Clarke m. Milton Ager
- "Fidgety Feet" m. Edwin B. Edwards, Nick LaRocca, Tony Spargo & Larry Shields
- "A Good Man Is Hard To Find" w.m. Eddie Green
- "Good Morning Mr. Zip-Zip-Zip!" w.m. Robert Lloyd
- "Goodbye, France" w.m. Irving Berlin
- "Hello Central! Give Me No Man's Land" w. Sam M. Lewis & Joe Young m. Jean Schwartz
- "Hindustan" w.m. Oliver G. Wallace & Harold Weeks
- "Hike! Hike! Hike! (Along the Old Turn Pike)" w.m. Nat Vincent
- "How Can You Tell" by Ned Wayburn
- "How Ya Gonna Keep 'em Down on the Farm (After They've Seen Paree)?" w. Sam M. Lewis & Joe Young m. Walter Donaldson
- "I Found The End Of The Rainbow" w.m. John Mears, Harry Tierney & Joseph McCarthy
- "I Want To Shimmy" by Shelton Brooks
- "If He Can Fight Like He Can Love, Good Night Germany!" w. Grant Clarke & Howard Johnson m. George W. Meyer
- "I'll Say She Does" w.m. B. G. DeSylva, Gus Kahn & Al Jolson
- "In The Land Of Beginning Again" w. Grant Clarke m. George W. Meyer
- "It Won't Be Long Before We're Home" m. Joseph E. Howard w. Paul Cunningham
- "Ja-Da" w.m. Bob Carleton
- "K-K-K-Katy" w.m. Geoffrey O'Hara
- "Madelon" w. (Eng) Alfred Bryan (Fr) Louis Bousquet m. Camille Robert
- "Mammy's Chocolate Soldier" w. Sidney Mitchell m. Archie Gottler
- "My Baby Boy" w. William Dillon m. Albert Von Tilzer
- "Oh How I Wish I Could Sleep Until My Daddy Comes Back Home" w. Sam M. Lewis & Joe Young m. Pete Wendling
- "Oh! Frenchy" w. Sam Ehrlich m. Con Conrad
- "Oh! How I Hate to Get Up in the Morning" w.m. Irving Berlin
- "Oh, Susie, Behave" w. Ed Rose and m. Abe Olman
- "On the Road to Calais" w. Alfred Bryan m. Al Jolson
- "Original Dixieland One-Step" w.m. Joe Jordan (musician), Nick LaRocca & J. Russell Robinson
- "Oui, Oui, Marie" w. Alfred Bryan & Joseph McCarthy m. Fred Fisher
- "Rock-A-Bye Your Baby With A Dixie Melody" w. Sam M. Lewis & Joe Young m. Jean Schwartz
- "The Rose of No Man's Land" w. Jack Caddigan m. James A. Brennan
- "Russian Rag" m. George L. Cobb
- "Somebody Stole My Gal" w.m. Leo Wood
- "Sometime" by Rida Johnson Young
- "Tell That to the Marines" w. Harold Atteridge & Al Jolson m. Jean Schwartz
- "There's Nobody Home but Me" w. Sam Erlich m. Con Conrad
- "They Were All Out of Step But Jim" w.m. Irving Berlin
- "Those Draftin' Blues" w.m. Maceo Pinkard
- "Till We Meet Again" w. Raymond B. Egan m. Richard A. Whiting
- "Tishomingo Blues" Spencer Williams
- "Wedding Bells, Will You Ever Ring For Me?" w. Sam M. Lewis & Joe Young m. Jean Schwartz
- "We'll Do Our Share while You're Over There" w. Lew Brown & Al Herriman m. Jack Egan
- "When Alexander Takes His Ragtime Band to France" w. Alfred Bryan & Edgar Leslie m. Cliff Hess
- "When Tony Goes Over The Top" w. Billy Frisch & Archie Fletcher m. Alex Marr
- "When You Look In The Heart Of A Rose" w. Marion Gillespie m. Florence Methuen
- "Why Do They All Take The Night Boat To Albany?" w. Joe Young & Sam M. Lewis m. Jean Schwartz
- "Without You" w. Nora Bayes m. Irving Fisher
- "Would You Rather Be a Colonel with an Eagle on Your Shoulder or a Private with a Chicken On Your Knee?" w. Sidney D. Mitchell m. Archie Gottler
- "You Can't Stop the Yanks (Till They Go Right Thru)" w.m. Jack Caddigan & Chick Story
- "You'll Find Old Dixieland In France" w. (Eng) Grant Clarke (Fr) Louis Delamarre m. George W. Meyer
- "You're In Style When You're Wearing A Smile" w.m. Al W. Brown, Gus Kahn & Egbert van Alstyne

== Top hit recordings ==
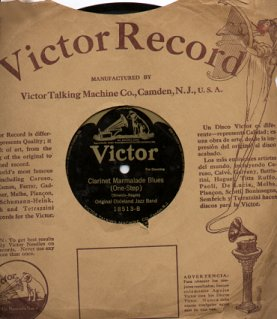

- "Tiger Rag/Skeleton Jangle" by the Original Dixieland Jass Band
- "Over There" by Enrico Caruso
- "After You've Gone" by Marion Harris
- "Smiles" by Joseph C. Smith's Orchestra
- "I'm Always Chasing Rainbows" by Charles W. Harrison
- "Rock-A-Bye Your Baby With a Dixie Melody" by Al Jolson
- "Hello Central, Give Me No-Man's Land" by Al Jolson
- "I'm Sorry I Made You Cry" by Henry Burr

== Classical music ==
- Joseph Achron – Violin Sonata No.2
- Agustín Barrios – Un sueño en la foresta
- Arnold Bax
  - String Quartet No. 1 in G major, GP. 199
  - Symphonic Variations, GP. 210
- Emile-Robert Blanchet – 2 Barcarolles for piano, Op.24
- Lili Boulanger
  - D'un matin de printemps
  - D'un soir triste
- Carl Busch – Indian Tribal Melodies
- John Alden Carpenter – Little Indian
- Frederick Delius – A Song Before Sunrise
- Edward Elgar – Violin Sonata
- George Enescu – Symphony No. 3 in C major, Op. 21
- Gabriel Fauré – Fantaisie, Op. 111
- Gustav Holst – The Planets
- Alexander Glazunov – Romance of Nina
- Paul Hindemith – Violin Sonatas, Op. 11
- Jan Ingenhoven – Trio for violin, cello and harp
- Leoš Janáček – Taras Bulba
- Sigfrid Karg-Elert – 30 Caprices for Flute Solo, Op. 107
- Charles Koechlin – Sonata (for bassoon and piano) Op. 71
- Leevi Madetoja – Symphony No. 2, Op. 35
- Bohuslav Martinů – String Quartet No. 1, H. 117
- Darius Milhaud – Symphonie de chambre No.2, Op. 49
- Nikolai Myaskovsky – Symphony No.5, Op. 18
- Carl Nielsen – Pan and Syrinx (tone poem)
- Preston Ware Orem – American Indian Rhapsody
- Francis Poulenc
  - Sonata for Two Clarinets, FP 7
  - Sonata for Piano Four Hands, FP 8
  - Toréador, FP 11
  - Mouvements perpétuels, FP 14
- Ottorino Respighi – La boutique fantasque. Balletto su musiche di G. Rossini
- Emil Reznicek – Symphony No.3 in D major (composer on April 5, premiered the following year)
- Camille Saint-Saens – Vers la victoire, Op.152
- Igor Stravinsky
  - Histoire du Soldat
  - Ragtime
- Karol Szymanowski
  - Songs of an infatuated Muezzin, for soprano and orchestra
  - 3 Caprices de Paganini, for voice and piano
  - 4 Songs to Lyrics by Rabindranath Tagore, for voice and piano
- Felix Weingartner – Freiheitsgesang, Op.67
- Kōsaku Yamada – Choreographic Symphony "Maria Magdalena"

== Opera ==
- Béla Bartók – Duke Bluebeard's Castle (composed 1911), Royal Hungarian Opera House in Budapest, 24 May
- Charles Wakefield Cadman – Shanewis, libretto by Nelle Richmond Eberhart
- Giacomo Puccini – Il trittico (consisting of Il tabarro, Suor Angelica and Gianni Schicchi)
- Franz Schreker – Die Gezeichneten
- Gabriel von Wayditch – Jesus Before Herod
- Felix Weingartner – Die Dorfschule

== Musical theatre ==
- As You Were London production opened at the Pavilion on August 3
- The Better 'Ole Broadway production opened at the Greenwich Village Theatre on October 19, transferred to the Cort Theatre on November 18 and transferred to the Booth Theatre on June 16, 1919, for a total run of 353 performances
- Buzz-Buzz London revue opened at the Vaudeville Theatre on December 20 and ran for 612 performances
- The Canary Broadway production opened at the Globe Theatre on November 4 and ran for 152 performances
- Fiddlers Three Broadway production opened at the Cort Theatre on September 3 and ran for 87 performances
- The Girl Behind the Gun Broadway production opened at the New Amsterdam Theatre on September 16 and ran for 160 performances
- Hullo, America London production opened at the Palace Theatre on September 25
- Ladies First Broadway production opened at the Broadhurst Theatre on October 24
- The Lilac Domino London production opened at the Empire Theatre on February 21 and ran for 747 performances
- Listen Lester (Music: Harold Orlob Book and Lyrics: Harry L. Cort & George E. Stoddard. Broadway production opened at the Knickerbocker Theatre on December 23 and ran for 272 performances. Starring Mary Milburn, Eddie Garvie, Johnny Dooley, Clifton Webb, Ada Mae Weeks, Ada Lewis and Gertrude Vanderbilt.
- Oh, Lady! Lady!! Broadway production opened at the Princess Theatre on February 1, transferred to the Casino Theatre on June 17 and ran for a total of 219 performances.
- The Passing Show of 1918 Broadway revue opened at the Winter Garden Theatre on July 25 and ran for 142 performances
- Phi-Phi Paris operetta opened at the Bouffes-Parisiens on November 12
- Sinbad Broadway production opened at the Winter Garden Theatre on February 14 and ran for 164 performances
- Sometime (Music: Rudolf Friml Book: Rida Johnson Young Lyrics: Rida Johnson Young ) Broadway production opened at the Shubert Theatre on October 4 and transferred to the Casino Theatre on November 11 for a total run of 283 performances. Featuring Mae West and Ed Wynn
- Toot-Toot! Broadway production opened at George M. Cohan's Theatre on March 11 and ran for 40 performances
- Very Good Eddie London production opened at the Palace Theatre on May 18 and ran for 341 performances
- Where the Lark Sings by Franz Lehár

== Births ==
- January 9 – Ruthilde Boesch, Austrian soprano (d. 2012)
- January 12 – Julio Gutiérrez, Cuban pianist, conductor and songwriter (d. 1990)
- January 20 – Juan García Esquivel, Mexican bandleader (d. 2002)
- January 24 – Gottfried von Einem, composer (d. 1996)
- January 27
  - Skitch Henderson, bandleader (d. 2005)
  - Elmore James, blues musician (d. 1963)
- February 2 – Danka Firfova, Macedonian soprano (d. 2003)
- February 3 – Joey Bishop, all-round entertainer (d. 2007)
- February 15 – Hank Locklin, singer (d. 2009)
- February 16 – Patty Andrews of The Andrews Sisters singing group (d. 2013)
- March 20 – Bernd Alois Zimmermann, German composer (d. 1970)
- March 20 – Marian McPartland, British jazz pianist (d. 2013)
- March 23 – Alberto Caracciolo, tango musician (d. 1994)
- March 29 – Pearl Bailey, singer (d. 1990)
- April 3 – Sixten Ehrling, conductor (d. 2005)
- April 25 – Astrid Varnay, operatic soprano (d. 2006)
- May 15 – Eddy Arnold, country singer (d. 2008)
- May 17 – Birgit Nilsson, operatic soprano (d. 2005)
- June 4 – Noel Estrada, composer (d. 1979)
- June 8 – Robert Preston, star of musicals (d. 1987)
- June 10 – Patachou, French singer (d. 2015)
- June 26 – Roger Voisin, trumpeter (d. 2008)
- July 5 – George Rochberg, composer (d. 2005)
- July 6 – Eugene List, classical pianist (d. 1985)
- July 24 – Ruggiero Ricci, violinist (d. 2012)
- July 27 – Leonard Rose, cellist (d. 1984)
- August 18 – Cisco Houston, folk singer (d. 1961)
- August 25 – Leonard Bernstein, composer and conductor (d. 1990)
- August 29 – Mrs Mills, born Gladys Jordan, honky-tonk pianist (d. 1978)
- August 31 – Alan Jay Lerner, US lyricist (d. 1986)
- September 13 – Dick Haymes, Argentinian-born US singer and actor (d. 1980)
- September 14 – Israel López "Cachao", Cuban bassist and composer (d. 2008)
- September 22 – Henryk Szeryng, violinist (d. 1988)
- September 23 – Lola Graham, pianist (d. 1992)
- September 26 – John Zacherle, actor and singer (d. 2016)
- October 9 – Bebo Valdés, Cuban pianist (d. 2013)
- October 11 – Jerome Robbins, choreographer (d. 1998)
- October 14 – Ellen Faull, operatic soprano (d. 2008)
- October 16 – Géori Boué, operatic soprano (d. 2017)
- October 17 – Rita Hayworth, actress, dancer and singer (d. 1987)
- October 26 – Eric Ericson, Swedish choral conductor and choral teacher (d. 2013)
- November 20 – Tibor Frešo, composer (d. 1987)
- December 12 – Joe Williams, jazz singer (d. 1999)
- December 19 – Professor Longhair, blues singer and pianist (d. 1980)
- December 23 – José Greco, flamenco dancer and choreographer (d. 2000)
- December 24 – Dave Bartholomew, bandleader, composer and arranger (d. 2019)

== Deaths ==
- January 10 – Alphonse Mailly, French composer (born 1833)
- January 19 – Juan José Cañas, co-writer of the El Salvador national anthem (b. 1826)
- February 7 – Alexander Taneyev, composer (b. 1850)
- February 15 – Miguel Marqués – Spanish composer and violinist (b. 1843)
- February 23 – Sophie Menter – German composer and pianist (b. 1846)
- February 27 – Vasily Safonov, pianist (born 1852)
- March 1 – Emil Sjögren, lieder composer (b. 1853)
- March 2 – Theobald Rehbaum, violinist (born 1835)
- March (12–15) – José White Lafitte, violinist and composer (b. 1836)
- March 13 – César Cui, music critic and composer (b. 1835)
- March 15 – Lili Boulanger, composer (b. 1893)
- March 18 – Giorgio M. Sulli, conductor, composer, and voice teacher (b. 1864)
- March 23 – Théo Ysaÿe, pianist and composer (b. 1865)
- March 25 – Claude Debussy, composer (b. 1862)
- March 26 – Charles Clairville, librettist (born 1855)
- April 8 – Lucjan Rydel, Polish lyricist and playwright (b. 1870)
- April 13 – David Ffrangcon Davies, operatic baritone (b. 1855)
- April 21 – Antonio Pini-Corsi, operatic baritone (b. 1859)
- May 5 – Bertha Palmer, writer, musician, businesswoman, socialite and philanthropist (b. 1849)
- May 18 – Toivo Kuula, conductor and composer (b. 1883) (accidentally shot)
- May 22 – Fritz Seitz, violinist and composer (b. 1848)
- June 9 – Jozsef Angster, master organ maker (b. 1834)
- June 10 – Arrigo Boito, writer and composer (b. 1842)
- July 27 – Gustav Kobbé, American music critic and author (b. 1857) (killed in sailing accident)
- August 12 – Anna Held, singer (b. 1872)
- August 15 – Heinrich Köselitz, author and composer (b. 1854)
- August 26 – Cecil Coles, composer (b. 1888) (killed in action)
- September 7 – Morfydd Llwyn Owen, singer, pianist and composer (b. 1891) (complications from surgery for appendicitis)
- September 18 – Ernest Farrar, composer (b. 1885) (killed in action)
- September 19
  - Nikolay Ladukhin, music theorist and composer (born 1860)
  - Liza Lehmann, operatic soprano and composer (b. 1862)
- October 7 – Hubert Parry, composer (b. 1848)
- October 15 – Antonio Cotogni, operatic baritone (b. 1831)
- October 16 – Felix Arndt, pianist and composer (b. 1889)
- October 22 – Charles Peccatte, archetier (b. 1850)
- October 24
  - Charles Lecocq, composer (b. 1832)
  - Marianne Scharwenka, violinist (b. 1856)
- October 29 – Rudolf Tobias, organist and composer (b. 1873)
- November 4 – Joaquín Valverde Sanjuán, zarzuela composer (b. 1875)
- December 13 – Nikolay Figner, Russian-Ukrainian lyric tenor (b. 1857)
- date unknown – King Watzke, violinist and bandleader (b. c. 1880)
