= 1918 in British music =

This is a summary of 1918 in music in the United Kingdom.

== Events ==
- 13 February – Cellist May Mukle and violist Rebecca Clarke give a recital at the Aeolian Hall, New York City, accompanied by Marjorie Hayward, performing works by Hubert Parry, Frank Bridge, and Clarke herself, including the premiėre of her Morpheus, written under the pen-name "Anthony Trent".
- August – Anglo-Welsh composer Philip Heseltine concludes a year's stay in Ireland with the writing of a number of songs which will be published under the pseudonym Peter Warlock.
- 29 September – The première of Gustav Holst's orchestral suite The Planets takes place before an invited audience at the Queen's Hall, London, with orchestra conducted by Adrian Boult.
- December – Ralph Vaughan Williams is appointed Director of Music, First Army.

== Popular music ==
- Ivan Caryll – "Some Day Waiting Will End"
- Harry Castling and Fred W. Leigh – "Where's Old Bill?"

== Classical music: new works ==
- Kenneth J. Alford – The Vanished Army, march
- Arnold Bax
  - String Quartet No. 1 in G major, GP. 199
  - Symphonic Variations, GP. 210
- Frederick Delius – A Song Before Sunrise
- Edward Elgar – Violin Sonata in E minor

== Musical theatre ==
- 1 June – Tails Up!, a revue starring Jack Buchanan, opens at Comedy Theatre, London, where it will run for 467 performances.
- 5 August – Roses of Picardy, by Evelyn Thomas, opens at the Hippodrome, Cannock, before moving to the West End the following year.

== Births ==
- 20 March – Marian McPartland, jazz pianist (died 2013)
- 16 April – Spike Milligan, comedian, writer, musician, poet and playwright (died 2002)
- 5 June – Robert Docker, composer (died 1992)
- 19 August – Dilys Elwyn Edwards, composer (died 2012)
- 22 September – A. J. Potter, composer (died 1980)
- 2 December – Wilfred Heaton, composer (died 2000)

== Deaths ==
- 15 January – Mark Sheridan, music hall performer, 53 (probable suicide by shooting)
- 13 April – David Ffrangcon Davies, baritone, 62
- 26 August – Cecil Coles, composer, 29 (killed in action)
- 7 September – Morfydd Llwyn Owen, singer, pianist and composer, 26 (complications from surgery for appendicitis)
- 7 October – Hubert Parry, composer, 70

== See also ==
- 1918 in the United Kingdom
