= Gertrude Vanderbilt =

Gertrude Vanderbilt may refer to:

- Gertrude Vanderbilt Whitney (née Vanderbilt; 1875–1942), American sculptor, art patron, and socialite
- Gertrude Conaway Vanderbilt (1901–1978), American socialite and philanthropist
- Gertrude Vanderbilt (actress) (ca. 1885–1960), American vaudeville performer
