= You Can't Stop the Yanks (Till They Go Right Thru) =

1918 song composed by Jack Caddigan

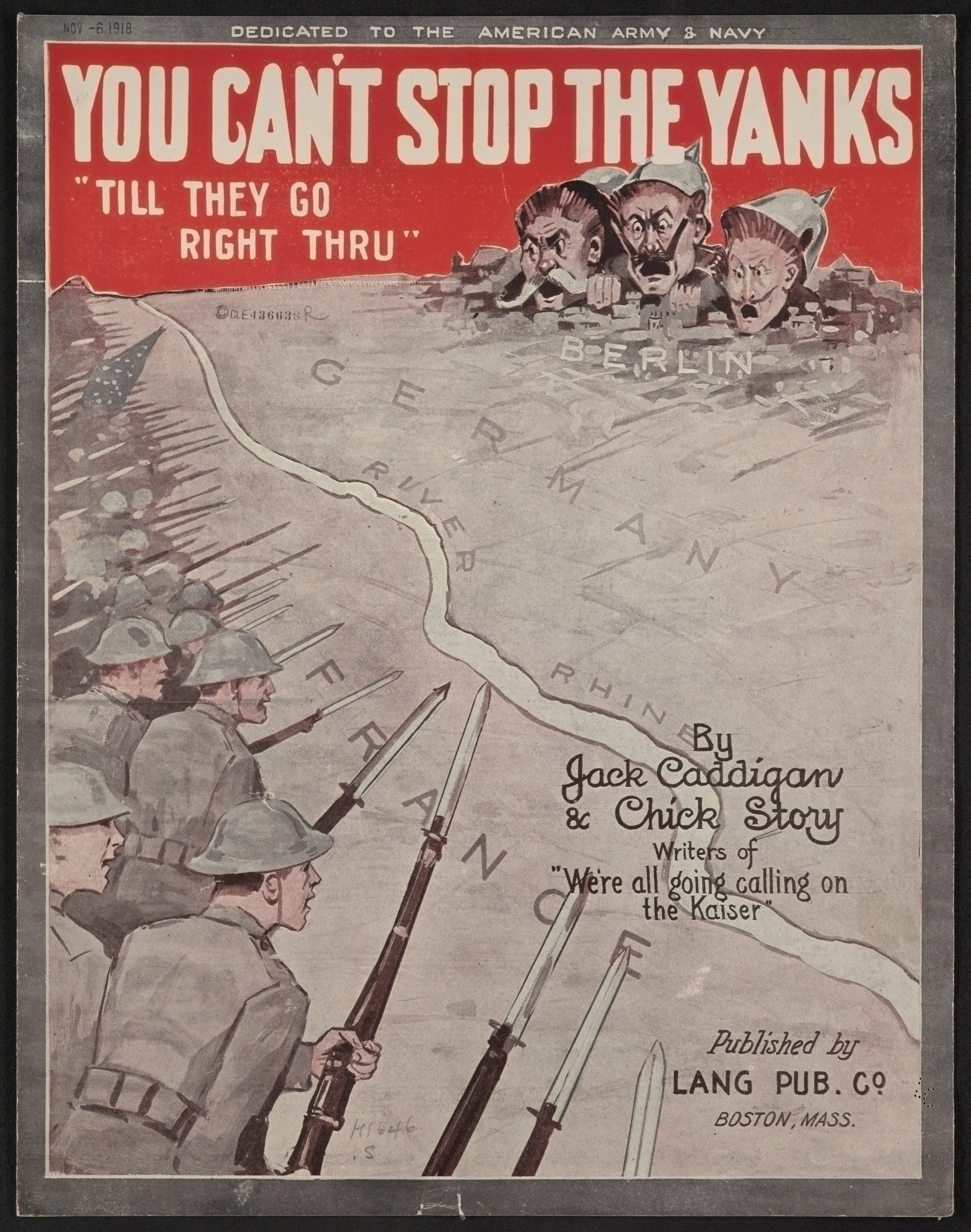

Song
- Released: 1918
- Label: Land Music Publishing Co.
- Songwriter(s): Jack Caddigan and Chick Story

"You Can't Stop the Yanks (Till They Go Right Thru)", also written as "You Can't Stop the Yanks Till They Go Right Thru Berlin" is a World War I era song released in 1918. Lyrics and music were written by Jack Caddigan and Chick Story, and it was published by Lang Music Publishing Co. of Boston. It was written for both voice and piano, and dedicated to the American Army and Navy. On the cover are soldiers with their weapons drawn standing in France. Across the Rhine River in Berlin, Germany, are presumably depictions of the three German leaders: Paul von Hindenburg, Kaiser Wilhelm II, and Erich Ludendorff. All three look surprised and angry as they size up the American troops nearing Germany.

The song's lyrics state that Germans should be afraid of the American troops. The Yankees intend to "[stop] the slaughter over the water" because "there's the dickens to pay." Throughout the song, Kaiser Wilhelm II is portrayed in a negative light. For example, "They'll kick the bottom out of Willie's pants," and "and that baby killing sinner Will stand up to eat his dinner."

The sheet music can be found at the Library of Congress and Pritzker Military Museum & Library.
