= James Alexander Brennan =

American songwriter (1885–1956)

James Alexander Brennan (November 18, 1885 – August 24, 1956) was an American songwriter. Sometimes identified as Jas. H. Brennan, he collaborated with lyricist Jack Caddigan (1879–1952) on several songs published by Leo Feist and Oliver E. Story. One of his more popular songs was "Little Red School House" which he wrote with Al Wilson in 1922. It was originally sung by the American Quartet and also by The Happiness Boys, Billy Jones and Ernest Hare. Brenda Lee sang it twice on TV, once at the age of 10 with Red Foley and later at 16 with Perry Como.

== Biography ==
He was born in Boston, Massachusetts, on November 18, 1885. He attended the Massachusetts Normal Art School. He was a camouflage artists for the U.S. Shipping Board during World War I.

He died on August 24, 1956, in Middleborough, Massachusetts.

== Publications ==
- The Dream I Had Last Night (1915) with Jack Caddigan and O.E. Story
- In The Golden Summertime (1915) with Jack Caddigan (sheet music)
- The Rose of No Man's Land; La rose sous les boulets (1918) with Jack Caddigan, (French lyric by Louis Delamarre) (sheet music)
- Dreaming Sweet Dreams of Mother
- If The Can Canny Cannibals Captured New York Town (1916) with Moore and O.E. Story
- When It's Cotton Pickin' Time In Tennessee (1918) with Jack Caddigan
- The Trail That Leads To You with Jack Caddigan
- When The Steamboats On The Swanee Whistle Rag-time (1918) with Jack Caddigan
- Scrambled Eggs One-Step & Tango (1914) published by O.E. Story (sheet music)
