= We're All Going Calling on the Kaiser =

American World War I era song

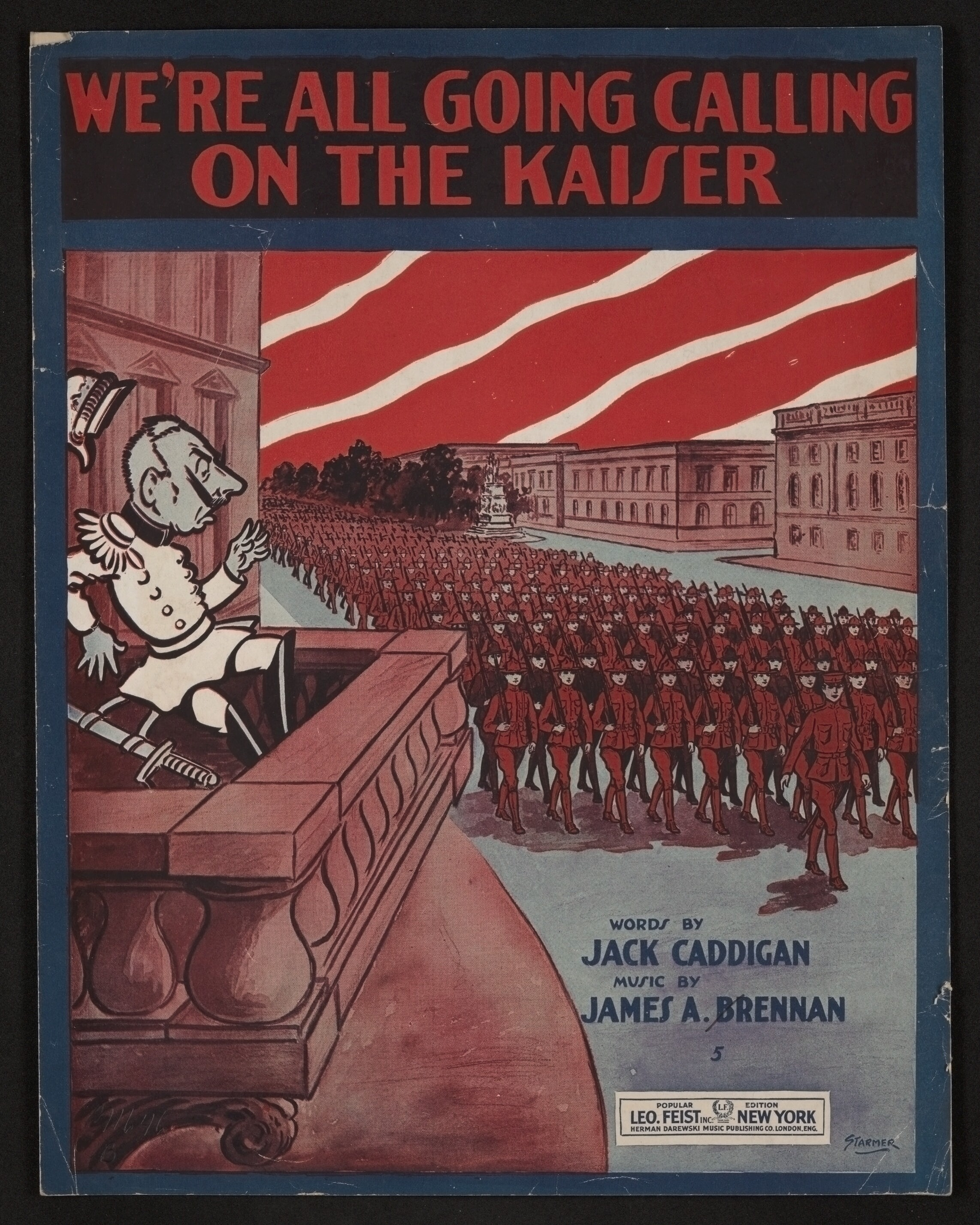
"We're All Going Calling on the Kaiser" sheet music cover

We're All Going Calling on the Kaiser is an American World War I era song written by Jack Caddigan and James A. Brennan, published by Leo Feist on February 16, 1918. The humorous song declared "We've got to teach the Kaiser to be wiser," with couplets like "And we'll bring him something good / A kimono made of wood." The song was recorded on Columbia records by Arthur Fields and Peerless Quartette and on Victor by William J. ("Sailor") Reilly.

The song was part of a genre of "Kaiser-hanging songs," which numbered more than a hundred in 1917 and 1918. The title page featured an illustration of the Kaiser recoiling as US troops entered Berlin.
