= Salvation Lassie of Mine =

"Salvation Lassie Of Mine"
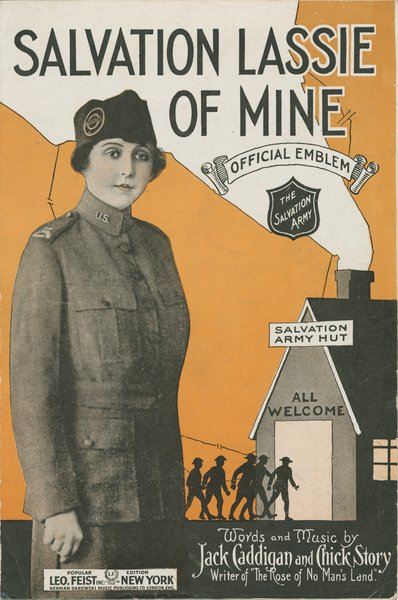
- Sheet Music cover

Song
- Language: English
- Published: 1919
- Songwriter(s): Jack Caddigan & Chick Story

Salvation Lassie Of Mine is a World War I song written by Jack Caddigan and Chick Story. The song was first published in 1919 by Leo Feist, Inc. in New York, NY. The sheet music cover features a photo of a Salvation Army nurse with soldiers entering a Salvation Army hut. This song was in the top 20 charts in March and April 1919, reaching number 18 in April.

The sheet music can be found at the Pritzker Military Museum & Library.
