= Don't Cry, Frenchy =

"Don't Cry Frenchy, Don't Cry"
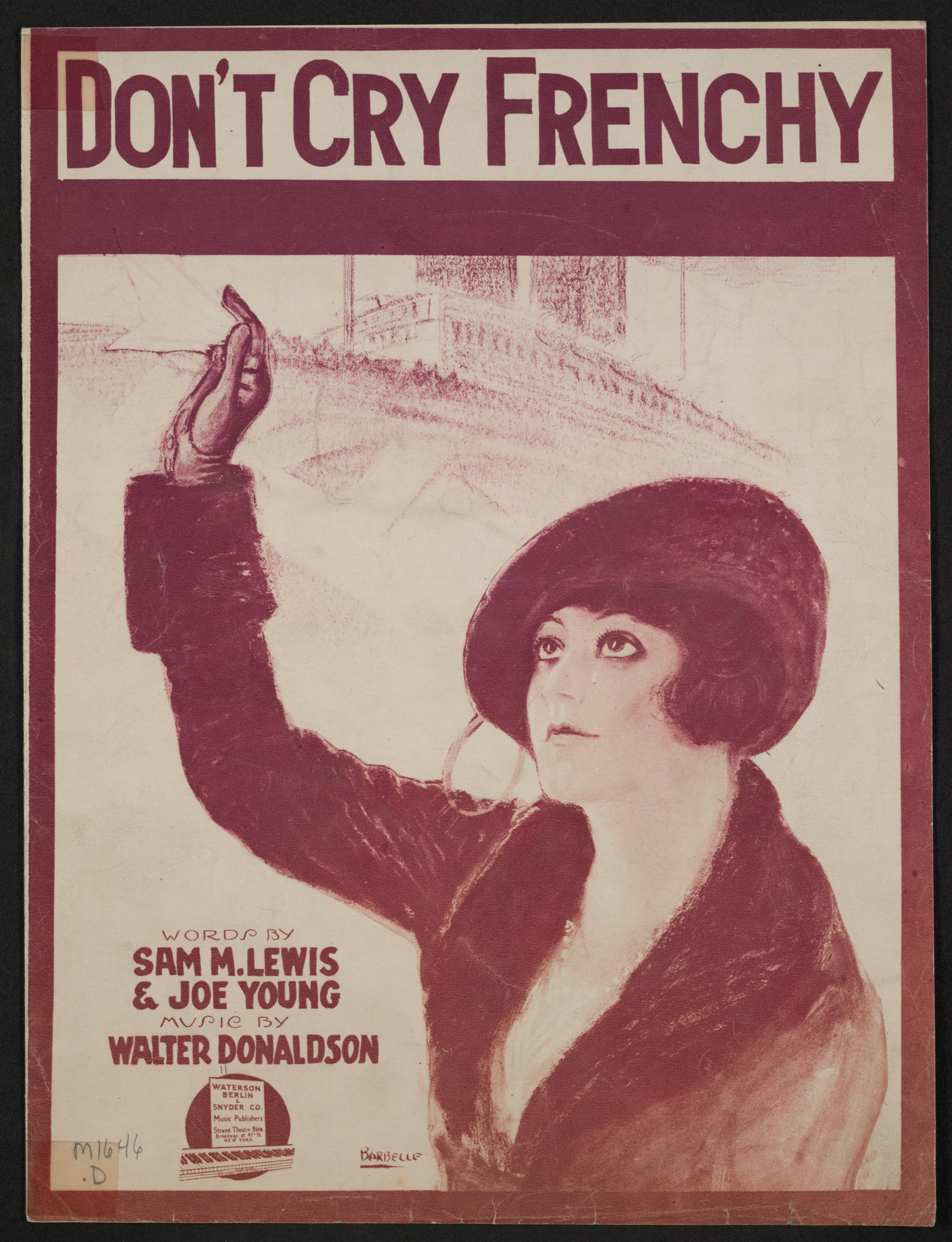
- Cover of WWI sheet music for "Don't Cry Frenchy"

Song
- Published: 1919
- Songwriter(s): Composer: Walter Donaldson; Lyricist: Sam L. Lewis and Joe Young

Don't Cry Frenchy, Don't Cry is a 1919 song written during World War I. The lyrics were written by Sam M. Lewis and Joe Young, and the music was written by Walter Donaldson.The song was published by Waterson, Berlin & Snyder Company in New York City.

"Don't Cry Frenchy, Don't Cry" depicts a soldier returning home from France, but sadly leaving his war romance behind. He assures her in the chorus, "We'll hear wedding bells chime. Oh! please don't cry, Frenchy, don't cry." The original sheet music cover depicts a woman crying. In another edition of sheet music the title was changed to "Don't Cry Frenchy," and the sheet music cover shows a woman waving at a ship. The song attracted the international public, who wanted to believe in its hopeful message that "peaceful stars" will soon begin to "heal the scars of Flanders."

Don't Cry, Frenchy was 19th in the top 20 charts in May and June 1919 and was recorded by both Lewis James and Charles Hart & Elliot Shaw.

The sheet music can be found at the Pritzker Military Museum & Library.
