= Alexander Goedicke =

Russian composer (1877–1957)

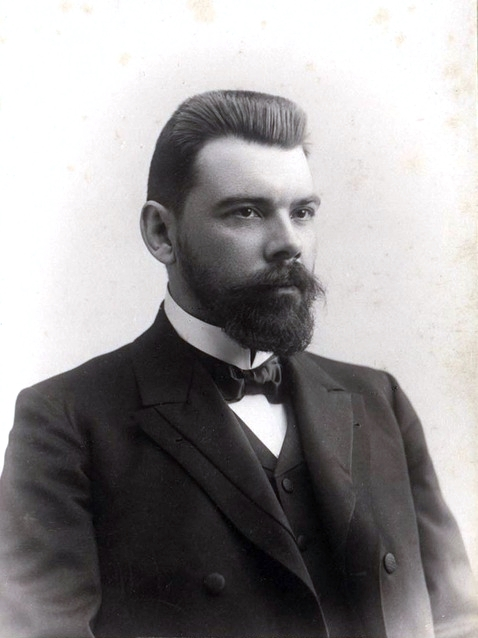
- Portrait, taken before 1917
- Born: Alexander Fyodorovich Goedicke; 4 March 1877; Moscow, Russia
- Died: 9 July 1957 (aged 80); Moscow, Soviet Union
- Occupations: Composer; pianist

Alexander Fyodorovich Goedicke (Russian: Александр Фёдорович Гёдике, romanized: Aleksandr Fyodorovich Gyodike; (Note: Also spelled Гедике (Gedike)) 4 March [O.S. 20 February] 1877 – 9 July 1957) was a Russian and Soviet composer and pianist.

== Early life ==
Alexander Goedicke was born in Moscow on 4 March [O.S. 20 February] 1877. He was Nikolai Medtner's first cousin. Alexander's father Fyodor Goedicke, a minor composer and pianist, was Medtner's mother's brother and his first teacher.

== Career ==
Goedicke was a professor at Moscow Conservatory. With no formal training in composition, he studied piano at the Moscow Conservatory with Galli, Pavel Pabst and Vasily Safonov. He received advice on music theory from Julius Conus, Nikolai Mikhailovich Ladukhin and Anton Arensky. He was also influenced by Sergei Taneyev.

Goedicke won the Anton Rubinstein Competition in 1900. Despite his lack of traditional guidance, his compositional efforts were rewarded when he won the Rubinstein Prize for Composition at the young age of 23. Goedicke died at the age of 80 in Moscow on 9 July 1957.

== Selected works ==
Opera

- Virineya (Виринея) (1913–1915); libretto by the composer
- At the Crossing (У перевоза) (1933); libretto by the composer
- Jacquerie (Жакерия) (1933–1937); libretto by the composer
- Macbeth (Макбет) (1944); libretto by the composer after William Shakespeare

Orchestral

- Dramatic Overture (Драматическая увертюра), Op. 7 (1897)
- Symphony No. 1 in F minor, Op. 15 (1903)
- Symphony No. 2 in A major, Op. 16 (1905)
- Prelude for string orchestra, organ, trumpet and harp, Op. 24 (published 1928)
- On War: From the Diary of a Fallen Soldier (На войне: из дневника убитого воина), 6 Improvisations, Op. 26 (published 1930)
- Symphony No. 3 in C minor, Op. 30 (1922)
- Зарницы, Symphonic Poem, Op. 39 (1929)
- 25 лет Октября (1942)
- 1941 год (1942)
- 30 лет Октября (1947)
- The Comedian

Concert band

- 4 Marches (4 марша для военного оркестра) for military orchestra, Op. 42

Concertante

- Concert Piece (Concertstück) in B minor for piano and orchestra, Op. 11 (1900)
- Concerto in D major for organ and string orchestra, Op. 35 (1927)
- Concerto in F minor for horn and orchestra, Op. 40 (published 1929)
- Concerto in B♭ minor for trumpet and orchestra, Op. 41 (published 1930)
- Concerto for violin and orchestra (1951)

Chamber music

- Sonata No. 1 Spring ("Весенняя") in A major for violin (or viola) and piano, Op. 10 (1899); dedicated to Jan Hřímalý
- Piano Trio in G minor, Op. 14 (published 1903)
- Piano Quintet in C major, Op. 21 (published 1911)
- 3 Improvizations (3 импровизации) for cello and piano, Op. 27 (published 1926)
- 2 Pieces for clarinet and piano, Op. 28

1. Nocturne
2. Etude

- String Quartet No. 1 in C minor, Op. 33
- Concert Etude (Концертный этюд) in G minor for trumpet and piano, Op. 49 (1948)
- String Quartet No. 2, Op. 75
- 10 Pieces of Medium Difficulty in 1st Position (10 пьес средней трудности в первой позиции) for violin and piano, Op. 80 (published 1948)
- Sonata No. 2 for violin and piano, Op. 83
- Sonata for cello and piano, Op. 88 (published 1951)

Organ

- 2 Preludes and Fugues (2 прелюдии и фуги), Op. 34
- 7 Pieces, Op. 84

Piano

- 4 Morceaux, Op. 1 (published 1899)

1. Prélude in C minor
2. Petite valse in F minor
3. Duetto
4. Scherzo in B♭ minor

- Concert Etude (Концертный этюд) in G minor, Op. 2 No. 2
- 20 Little Pieces for Beginners (20 маленьких пьес для начинающих), Op. 6
- 10 Miniatures in the Etude Form (10 миниатюр в форме этюдов), Op. 8
- 3 Morceaux, Op. 9 (published 1900)

1. Méditation
2. Prélude
3. Tarantella, Étude de concert

- 6 Pieces for piano 4 hands, Op. 12
- Ballade, Op. 13
- Stanzas (Stances), Op. 17
- Sonata in D major, Op. 18
- 2 Preludes, Op. 19
- Prelude ("Les aveugles" of Maeterlinck) in C major, Op. 20 (published 1910)
- 4 Etudes in Octave, Op. 22
- 50 Exercises (50 упражнений), Op. 23
- 40 Melodic Etudes for Beginners in Order of Gradual Difficulty (40 мелодических этюдов для начинающих), Op. 32
- 60 Simple Piano Pieces for Beginners (60 легких фортепианных пьес для начинающих), Op. 36

No. 20 Sonatina in C major

- 3 Preludes, Op. 51
- 5 Pieces, Op. 52 (published 1938)
- 22 Pieces, Op. 57
- 25 Pieces of Medium Difficulty, Op. 59
- 15 Kirghiz Songs of Medium Difficulty (15 киргизских песен средней трудности), Op. 63
- 2 Pieces, Op. 64
- 3 Pieces, Op. 65
- 3 Pieces, Op. 66
- 8 Pieces, Op. 77
- 4 Concert Etudes, Op. 82
- Prelude and Fugue in C minor, Op. 86
- Prelude and Fugue in C major, Op. 87
- 12 Melodic Etudes of Medium Difficulty (12 мелодических этюдов средней трудности), Op. 101 (published 1964)

Cantata

- Слава советским пилотам (1933); words by Alexsei Alexandrovich Surkov
- Родина радости (1937); words by Alexsei Alexandrovich Surkov

Vocal

- 3 Songs (Три Романсы) for voice and piano, Op. 5
- Russian Folk Songs (Русские народные ресни) for voice, violin, cello and piano, Books I–III, Op. 29; Book IV, Op. 31; Book V, Op. 37; Book VI, Op. 38

== Sources ==
- Grigor′yeva, Galina (2001). "Gedike [Goedicke], Aleksandr Fyodorovich". Oxford Music Online.
