= The Army's Full of Irish (A Man from Erin Never Runs, He's Irish) =

1917 song written by Bert Hanlon and composed by Walter Donaldson

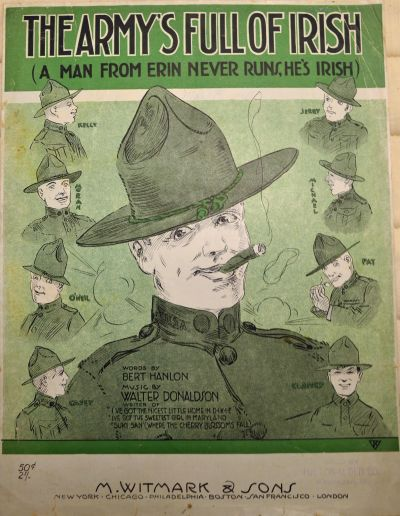
- Sheet music cover

Song
- Language: English
- Published: 1917
- Composer: Walter Donaldson
- Lyricist: Bert Hanlon

"The Army's Full of Irish (A Man from Erin Never Runs, He's Irish)" is a World War I song written by Bert Hanlon and composed by Walter Donaldson. The song was first published in 1917 by M. Witmark & Sons in New York City. The sheet music cover depicts a soldier smoking a cigar flanked by eight soldiers with Irish names.

The sheet music can be found at the Pritzker Military Museum & Library.

== Bibliography ==
- Karsten, Peter, ed. (2006). Encyclopedia of War & American Society. Thousand Oaks, California: SAGE Publications. ISBN 0-7619-3097-3. OCLC 277232557.
- Parker, Bernard S. (2007). World War I Sheet Music. Vol. 1. Jefferson: McFarland & Company, Inc. ISBN 978-0-7864-2798-7. OCLC 71790113.
- Vogel, Frederick G. (1995). World War I Songs: A History and Dictionary of Popular American Patriotic Tunes, with Over 300 Complete Lyrics. Jefferson: McFarland & Company, Inc. ISBN 0-89950-952-5. OCLC 32241433.
