= How Ya Gonna Keep 'em Down on the Farm (After They've Seen Paree)? =

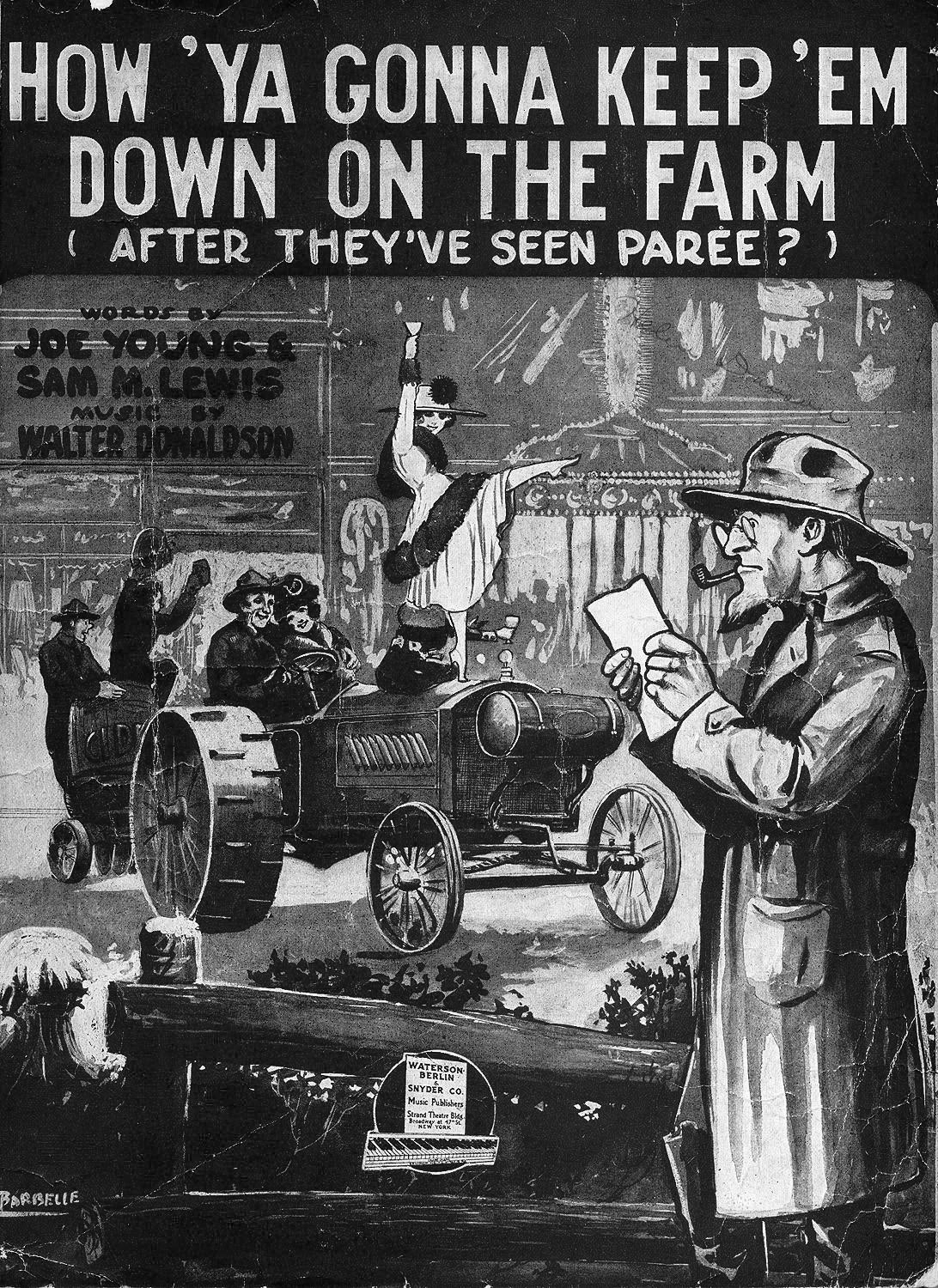
- Sheet music cover

Song
- Published: 1919
- Composer: Walter Donaldson
- Lyricists: Joe Young, Sam M. Lewis

"How Ya Gonna Keep 'em Down on the Farm (After They've Seen Paree)?" is a World War I-era popular song that rose to popularity after the war had ended. The lyrics highlight concern that soldiers would not want to return to their family farms after experiencing the European city life and high culture of Paris during World War I. The song features music by Walter Donaldson and words by Joe Young and Sam M. Lewis. It was published in 1919 by Waterson, Berlin & Snyder Co in New York.

== History ==
How 'Ya Gonna Keep 'Em Down On The Farm
How 'Ya Gonna Keep 'Em Down On The Farm, performed by Byron G. Harlan and Ada Jones in 1919

The song was first introduced to vaudeville by Sophie Tucker. Eddie Cantor also added it to his stage set. An early jazz band, Jim Europe's 369th Infantry Band frequently performed it in 1919 after arriving back in New York.

== Lyrics ==
As sung by early 20th-century recording artist Nora Bayes, in her 1919 recording.

Verse 1

"Reuben, Reuben, I've been thinking"
said his wifey dear.
"Now that all is peaceful and calm
The boys will soon be back on the farm"
Mister Reuben started winking and slowly rubbed his chin.
He pulled his chair up close to mother
And he asked her with a grin:

Chorus

How ya gonna keep 'em down on the farm
After they've seen Paree'?
How ya gonna keep 'em away from Broadway
Jazzin' around and paintin' the town?
How ya gonna keep 'em away from harm, that's a mystery
Imagine Reuben when he meets his Pa,
He'll kiss his cheek and holler "OO-LA-LA!
How ya gonna keep 'em down on the farm
After they've seen Paree'?

Chorus

Tell me mother!
How ya gonna keep 'em down on the farm
After they've seen Paree'?
And, how ya gonna keep 'em away from records
Jazzin around and paintin' the town?
Wooh!
How ya gonna keep 'em away from harm, that's a mystery
They'll never want to see a rake or plow
And who the deuce can parleyvous a cow?
How ya gonna keep 'em down on the farm
After they've seen Paree'?

== Legacy ==
Like many World War I-era songs, it was sung by soldiers in World War II.

== In popular culture ==
- In the 1942 movie For Me and My Gal, actress Judy Garland sings and dances to this song during one scene.
- In the 1995 film Congo, after being told that the scientists intend to reintroduce the gorilla Ami back to the wild, Monroe asks "You're going to try and take her back to the farm now that she's seen Paris?".
- The song is featured on the soundtrack of the 1996 video game, Sid Meier's Civilization II: Conflicts in Civilization.
- In the 1998 film The Big Lebowski, after it is revealed Bunny Lebowski ran away from her family’s farm, The Dude remarks “How are you gonna keep them on the farm once they’ve seen Karl Hungus?” referring to a male pornographer in the movie.
- "How ya gonna keep 'em down on the farm after they've seen Pammy?!" is a famous, oft-repeated line from Archer (2009 TV series), particularly in Season 3, Episode 10 ("Crossing Over"). Pam Poovey sings this adapted WWI-era tune after her sexual encounter with Archer.
- In the 2014 animated film The Lego Movie, the character MetalBeard uses a short sound clip of Judy Garland's 1942 performance while displaying an example of an unexpected activity.
