= Sam M. Lewis =

American singer and lyricist (1885–1959)

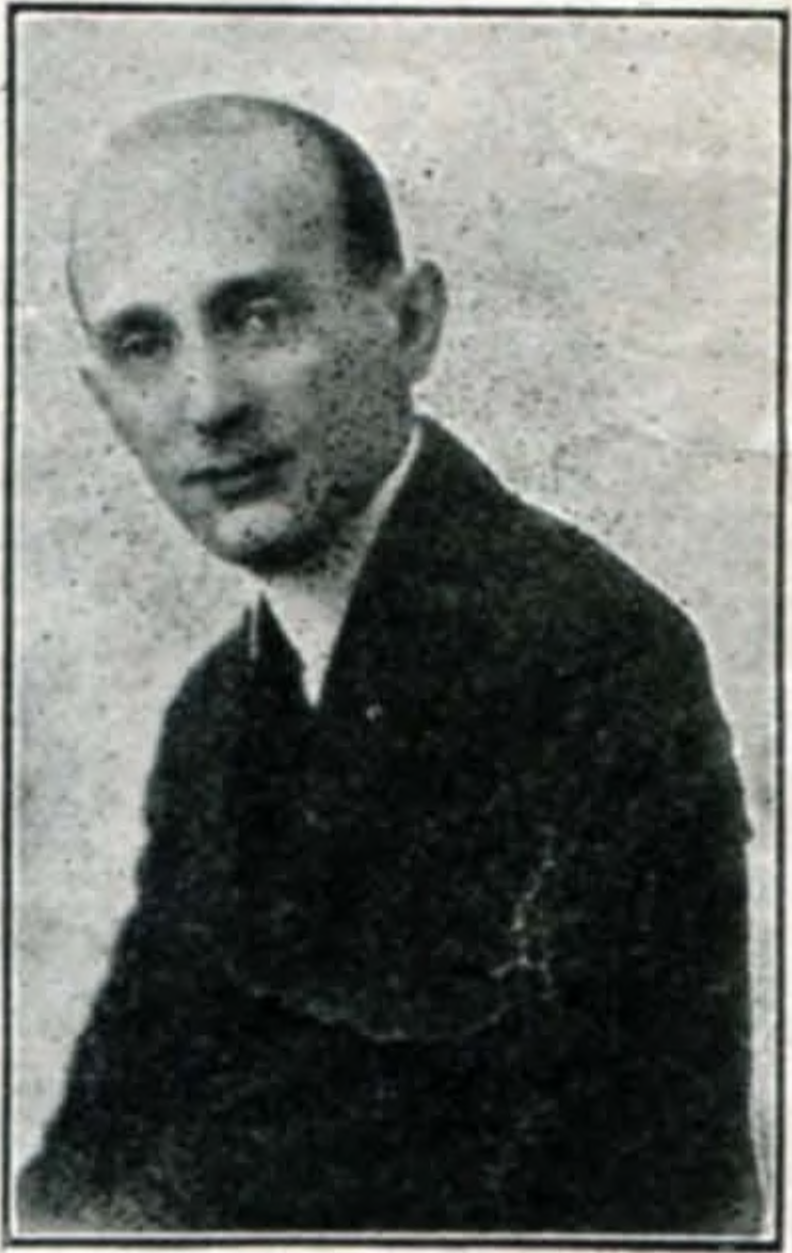
- Lewis in 1919

Background information
- Born: Samuel M. Levine; October 25, 1885
- Origin: New York City, New York, U.S.
- Died: November 22, 1959 (aged 74) New York City, New York, U.S.
- Occupation: Lyricist
- Formerly of: Joe Young, many others

Sam M. Lewis (born Samuel M. Levine; October 25, 1885 – November 22, 1959) was an American singer and lyricist.

== Career ==
Lewis was born in New York City, United States. He began his music career by singing in cafés throughout New York City, and began writing songs in 1912. He wrote numerous songs, and collaborated with other songwriters, most frequently with Joe Young, but also with Fred Ahlert, Walter Donaldson, Bert Grant, Harry Warren, Jean Schwartz, Ted Fio Rito, J. Fred Coots, Ray Henderson, Victor Young, Peter DeRose, Harry Akst, and Maurice Abrahams. He also contributed to the Broadway musical The Laugh Parade, and Hollywood musicals such as Squibs Wins the Calcutta Sweep, The Singing Fool, Wolf Song, and Spring is Here. His songs have been used in more modern movies, such as Big Fish and The Pelican Brief. Sam Lewis was a charter member of the American Society of Composers, Authors, and Publishers in 1914, and was inducted into the Songwriters Hall of Fame. He died in New York City. He is interred in Woodlawn Cemetery, in The Bronx, New York City.

== Selected works ==
- "Dinah"
- "There's a Little Lane Without a Turning on the Way to Home, Sweet Home" - 1915. m: Geo. W. Meyer
- "Everybody Took a Kick at Nicholas" - 1917
- "In San Domingo" - 1917. m: Ted Snyder
- "There's a Million Heroes in Each Corner of the USA" - 1917. m: Maurice Abrahams
- "Hello Central! Give Me No Man's Land" - 1918. m: Jean Schwartz
- "Just a Baby's Prayer at Twilight (For Her Daddy Over There)" - 1918. m: M. K. Jerome
- "Oh How I Wish I Could Sleep Until My Daddy Comes Home" - 1918. m: Pete Wendling
- "Oh! What a Time for the Girlies When the Boys Come Marching Home" - 1918. m: Harry Ruby
- "The Tale the Church Bell Told (Someone Will Answer for My Silence)" - 1918. m: Bert Grant
- "Wedding Bells, Will You Ever Ring for Me?" - 1918. m: Jean Schwartz
- "Worst Is Yet to Come" - 1918. m: Bert Grant
- "You're the Greatest Little Mothers in the World (Mothers of America)" - 1918. m: Archie Gottler
- "Don't Cry Frenchy, Don't Cry - 1919. m: Walter Donaldson
- "Poor Little Butterfly Is a Fly Girl Now" - 1919. m: M. K. Jerome
- "Fires of Faith" - 1919. m: U. M. Jerome
- "Hippity Hop" - 1919. m: Walter Donaldson
- "Mother's Tears" - 1919. m: George W. Meyer
- "My Barney Lies Over the Ocean (The Way He Lied to Me)" - 1919. m: Bert Grant
- "Shall They Plead in Vain" - 1919. m: Ray Perkins
- "What's the Use of Kickin' (Let's Go 'Round with a Smile)" - 1919. m: Walter Donaldson
- "You're a Million Miles from Nowhere When You're One Little Mile from Home" - 1919
- "For All We Know"
- "Gloomy Sunday" (English version)
- "Has Anybody Seen My Gal?"
- "How Ya Gonna Keep 'em Down on the Farm (After They've Seen Paree)?" - 1919. m: Walter Donaldson
- "I'm Sitting on Top of the World"
- "In a Little Spanish Town"
- "Just Friends"
- "Laugh, Clown, Laugh"
- "Rock-a-Bye Your Baby with a Dixie Melody"
- "Street of Dreams"
