= Hello Central! Give Me No Man's Land =

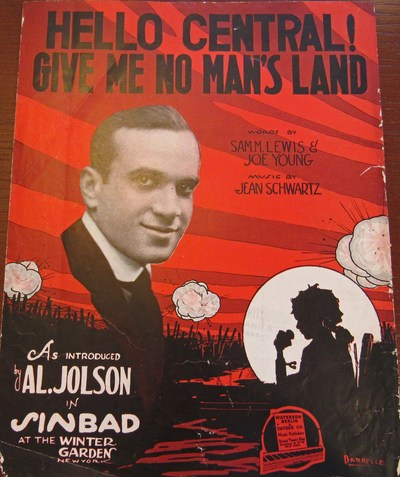
- Sheet music cover

Song
- Released: 1918
- Composer(s): Jean Schwartz
- Lyricist(s): Sam M. Lewis, Joe Young

'"Hello Central! Give Me No Man's Land" is a World War I era song released in 1918. Lyrics were written by Sam M. Lewis and Joe Young. Jean Schwartz composed the music. The song was published by Waterson Berlin & Snyder, Co. of New York City. Artist Albert Wilfred Barbelle designed the sheet music cover, which features a photo of Al Jolson next to a shadow of a child on the phone. Explosions in No Man's Land take up the rest of the red background. The song was written for both voice and piano. It was first introduced in the 1918 musical Sinbad.

The sheet music can be found at Pritzker Military Museum & Library.

The song tells the story of a child attempting to call her father in No man's land (the phrase "Hello, central" was used when addressing the switchboard operator; in those days, callers would call a switchboard and ask to be manually connected to their party). She is unable to reach him over the telephone because her father has been killed fighting on the Western Front. The chorus is as follows:

"Hello Central! Give me No Man's Land,
My daddy's there, my mamma told me;
She tip-toed off to bed
After prayers were said;
Don't ring when you get the number,
Or you'll disturb mamma's slumber
I'm afraid to stand here at the 'phone
Cause I'm alone.
So won't you hurry;
I want to know why mama starts to weep
When I say, 'Now I lay me down to sleep';
Hello Central! Give me No Man's Land."
