= Oliver E. Story =

American composer

- Born: Oliver Ewell Story; August 7, 1885
- Died: October 17, 1961 (aged 76)
- Other name: Chick Story
- Education: Harvard University (Class of 1908)
- Occupations: Composer; Music publisher Performer
- Notable work: "Salvation Lassie of Mine"; "Little French Mother of Mine"; "Blue Diamonds"

Oliver E. (“Chick”) Story (August 7, 1885 – October 17, 1961) was a composer, publisher, and performer active in Boston from 1910 to 1925.

== Biography ==
Oliver Ewell (“Chick”) Story was born of solid Massachusetts stock to Theodore Parker Story and Emma Graham Ewell; his father owned a grocery store, and the family appeared to be prosperous. Oliver was an only child, never married, and lived with his father in East Boston until 1942, when they moved to Chelsea. He returned to East Boston after his father's death in 1947 and remained there for the rest of his life.

Story graduated from Harvard in 1908 and remained an active alumnus at subsequent reunions. His father ran for office in Boston and there are indications that Oliver was also involved with politics. In 1922, he became a Mason (as his father had before him) and later was very active in that, and in other fraternal organizations; he was given a Masonic funeral after his death on October 19, 1961.

== Professional career ==
Apart from a march written at Harvard, Oliver E. Story's early pieces and publications were collaborations with Peter H. (“Happy”) O’Neil. From 1910 through 1912 Story (music) and O’Neil (words) created over a dozen songs, with occasional contributions from other writers and composers. O’Neil and Story also formed a publishing house, issuing all their own titles and about thirty others, but the partnership ended when O’Neil died of cancer, aged 28, on September 28, 1912.

The following year Oliver E. Story opened his own publishing firm, with offices at 218 Tremont Street, the heart of Boston's music district.He issued over fifty titles from 1913 through 1917, including more than a dozen of his own compositions. Also in 1913 he began collaborating with lyricist Jack Caddigan, the start of a partnership that continued for ten years. Noteworthy early songs included “Thanks for the Lobster” and “A Hundred Years from Now,” the latter co-composed with James A. Brennan. Caddigan, Story, and Brennan created the bulk of titles published by Story's firm. During this period Story was also active as a pianist and singer, appearing at events from political rallies to vaudeville. As composer he was known as “Chick,” directing the “Chick Story Trio” and “Chick Story Serenaders,” but as a publisher he remained “Oliver E. Story.”

Story's publishing offices closed in 1917, and in 1918 Oliver was employed in the Boston office of Leo Feist. Caddigan and Story published a few songs with Boston publishers (Billy Lang, D. W. Cooper) and then released “Salvation Lassie of Mine,” a popular postwar number, with Feist. This was followed by “Little French Mother of Mine,” also with Feist, and “Blue Diamonds,” published by Joseph W. Stern, both quite successful. Caddigan and Story self-published their last few songs in 1921–22.

Story continued to list himself as a “musician” in Boston City Directories, and he appeared irregularly in Boston papers as a pianist and as director of amateur theatricals. In the 1940s he appeared in restaurants and clubs, performing “songs of yesteryear.” He evidently had stopped performing by 1950 and receded from public view; his obituary misidentified his most popular titles and credited him with publishing three hundred songs, over twice as many as he actually issued.

== Further reading and digital archives ==
- IN Harmony: Sheet Music from Indiana
- World War I Sheet Music (Brown University)
- Historic American Sheet Music (Duke University)
