= Roses of Picardy (musical) =

Roses of Picardy was a British musical written by Evelyn Thomas. It first opened in the provinces in 1918, before moving to London's West End in 1919. At the time it was advertised as a musical military play as its plot was centred on events connected with the First World War. It consisted of three acts and was described as having the characteristics of drama, musical comedy, farce and revue, in turn. The song "Roses of Picardy" was featured in this musical. The plot was described as follows:

Lord Arthur Parkin seeks to separate two young lovers Jack Chester and Jennefen Graham; and as Jack has no particular income, and pressure is continually brought on Jennefen, things look black for true love. Moreover, Jack is unjustly accused of too familiar relations with the young and flighty Duchess of Southminster, who is tired of living a simple country life with the Duke, whose second wife she is. However, war breaks out, and the Duke joins his regiment, whilst the Duchess runs a hospital at Boulogne, and Jack enlists as a private in the Flying Corps. Lord Arthur tries to kill Jack by igniting some poison gas near his dug-out, but Billy Jones saves him. The machinations of the villain are discovered, and he is about to be arrested as a traitor when he makes a dash for the German lines, and is reported killed. All is now apparently clear for the wedding of Jennefen and Jack (the latter having obtained his commission) ...
