= Danka Firfova =

Macedonian soprano (1918–2003)

- Данка Фирфова
- Born: February 2, 1918; Veles
- Died: June 2, 2003 (aged 85); Skopje, North Macedonia
- Occupations: Operatic soprano; music educator

Danka Firfova (Macedonian: Данка Фирфова; 2 February 1918 – 2 June 2003) was a Macedonian soprano and music educator. Grove Music Online described her as a "dramatic soprano" and "one of the first fully trained opera singers in Macedonia" who was a "founder of the Macedonian Opera" in 1947.

== Biography ==
Danka Firfova was born in Veles on 2 February 1918. She studied singing in Belgrade with Natalija Ilić from 1934 to 1939, and later with Cirila Š. Medvedova in the early 1940s. She pursued further studies with baritone Hristo Brmbarov (also known as Christo Brambarov) in Sofia; studying with him in 1942. She later studied with soprano Adelaide Saraceni in Milan in 1952; perfecting her training at that time. She won the International Contest of Opera Artists in Belgium in 1957.

Prior to 1947 Firfova was primarily active as a music teacher. She began her teaching career in Sofia, and in 1941 and 1942 she studied music pedagogy with Bulgarian teacher Dimitra Lilova. In 1942 she was appointed a teacher at the Veles High School and later taught music at the All-Girls High School in Skopje. In May 1947 she performed in the first staging of Cavalleria rusticana given in the Macedonian language; portraying the role of Santuzza in what was the first production of the Macedonian Opera. She remained a resident principal soprano of the Macedonian Opera until 1975. She was also a member of the Serbian National Theatre from 1956 to 1958.

Firfova's opera repertoire included Amelia in Un ballo in maschera, Charlotte in Werther, Desdemona in Otello, Elisabetta in Don Carlo, Leonora in Fidelio, Leonora in Il trovatore, Mařenka in The Bartered Bride, Micaela in Carmen, and the title roles in Aida, Norma, Tosca, and Turandot. Music criticism praised the roundness and heat of her dramatic soprano voice. She was the recipient of "11th October" prize in 1962, the highest honor given by the Socialist Republic of Macedonia. She was later recognized with a lifetime achievement honor in 1976 just following her retirement.

Firfova died in Skopje on 2 June 2003.
