= Walter Donaldson (songwriter) =

American writer and publisher of popular songs (1893–1947)

Walter J. Donaldson
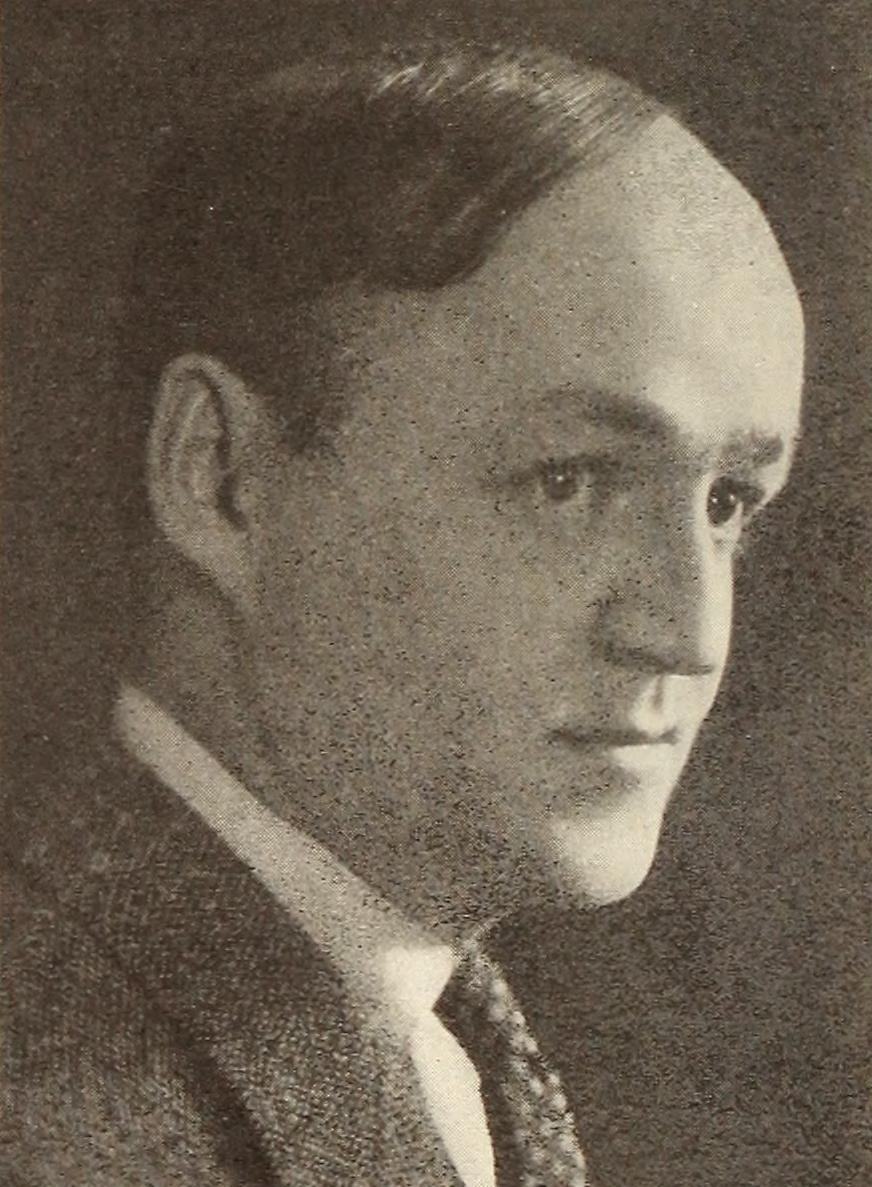
- Donaldson, c. 1926

Background information
- Born: February 15, 1893; New York City, United States
- Died: July 15, 1947 (aged 54) Santa Monica, California, United States
- Occupations: Composer; lyricist; publishing company entrepreneur
- Years active: 1915-1943

Walter J. Donaldson (February 15, 1893 – July 15, 1947) was an American prolific songwriter and founder of a publishing company. He wrote or published over 600 original songs, many of which are listed in the Great American Songbook.

== Biography ==
Walter Donaldson was born in Brooklyn, New York as one of 11 children. His family was musically inclined and his mother was a piano teacher and an organist at the local parish; however, he never received any formal musical training. His father was a shoe cutter. He had Irish heritage, referenced in some of his songs.

In high school, he wrote original music for school productions. After graduating, he got a job as a clerk on Wall Street but left to take a job as a demonstrator for a music publisher, making $15/hour. He was fired after it was discovered that he was using the piano to write his own songs instead of selling the sheet music of the publisher.

Donaldson began his professional music career as a staff pianist in Tin Pan Alley. His first songs were published in 1915, when he was 22.

His first major hit was "The Daughter of Rosie O'Grady" (1918) (lyrics written by Monty C. Brice).

During World War I, Donaldson enlisted in the United States Army, where, instead of fighting in the war, he entertained troops at Camp Upton and met Irving Berlin. His time there inspired "How Ya Gonna Keep 'em Down on the Farm (After They've Seen Paree)?"

In 1919, Donaldson was hired as a songwriter by Irving Berlin, with whom he worked until 1928. In the early 1920s, Donaldson began working with lyricist Gus Kahn. Their first hit was "My Buddy" (1922) and they collaborated many times during their careers. In 1928, he co-founded Donaldson, Douglas & Gumble, Inc. with Walter Douglas and Mose Gumble to publish both his own songs and the songs of others. Among the non-Donaldson hit songs that the firm published was "Winter Wonderland" (1934).

Although he was primarily a composer, Donaldson wrote the lyrics for many songs that he composed including "At Sundown (When Love Is Calling Me Home)" (1927) and "Little White Lies" (1930).

In 1929, Donaldson moved to Hollywood, Los Angeles to seek roles as a composer for films. His film credits include work on Glorifying the American Girl (1929), Suzy (1936), The Great Ziegfeld (1936), Panama Hattie (1942), Follow the Boys (1944), and What's Buzzin', Cousin? (1943).

== Personal life and death ==
Donaldson was a gambler. In 1928, he appealed to the New York Supreme Court to vacate a default judgment against him from a $5,970 gambling debt for which he blamed an allegedly "crooked" roulette wheel; Justice Alfred Frankenthaler issued a stay of execution on collection of the debt.

On October 6, 1934, Donaldson married actress Walda (real name Dorothy) Mansfield. They had two daughters and divorced in 1942.

Donaldson was also a heavy drinker, which led to kidney and liver problems that forced him to retire in 1943. He died in 1947 in Santa Monica, California due to a liver ailment. He is buried at an unmarked grave at the Holy Cross Cemetery, Brooklyn.

== Selected works ==
- "At Sundown (When Love is Calling Me Home)"
- "The Army's Full of Irish (A Man from Erin Never Runs, He's Irish)" (lyrics by Bert Hanlon)
- "Away Down East in Maine"
- "Because My Baby Don't Mean 'Maybe' Now"
- "Carolina in the Morning" (lyrics by Gus Kahn)
- "Can't We Fall in Love" (lyrics by Harold Adamson)
- "Changes" (In 1928 immediately a hit for Paul Whiteman with Bing Crosby)
- "Cynthia"
- "Did I Remember" (lyrics by Harold Adamson)
- "Dixie Vagabond" (lyrics by Gus Kahn)
- "Don't Be Angry"
- "Don't Cry Frenchy, Don't Cry" (lyrics by Sam M. Lewis and Joe Young)
- "Down Where the South Begins" (lyrics by Gus Kahn)
- "Dreamy Delaware" (music by "Violinsky" (Sol Ginsberg))
- "Duke of Kak-I-Ak" (lyrics by Edgar Leslie)
- "Eight Little Letters"
- "An Ev'ning in Caroline"
- "For No Reason at All" (lyrics by Sam M. Lewis and Joe Young)
- "Georgia"
- "A Girlfriend of a Boyfriend of Mine" (lyrics by Gus Kahn)
- "Give Me Just a Little Bit of What You've Got" (lyrics by George A. Whiting)
- "Give Me My Mammy" (lyrics by Buddy DeSylva)
- "Goodness Gracious Agnes" (lyrics by Gus Kahn)
- "How Ya Gonna Keep 'em Down on the Farm (After They've Seen Paree)? (lyrics by Sam M. Lewis and Joe Young)
- "Kansas City Kitty" (lyrics by Edgar Leslie)
- "Little White Lies"
- "Love Me or Leave Me" (lyrics by Gus Kahn)
- "Makin' Whoopee" (lyrics by Gus Kahn)
- "Maybe It's the Moon" (lyrics by Robert Wright and Chet Forrest)
- "Mississippi Honeymoon" (lyrics by Gus Kahn)
- "Mister Meadowlark" (lyrics by Johnny Mercer)
- "My Baby Just Cares for Me" (lyrics by Gus Kahn)
- "My Blue Heaven" (lyrics by George A. Whiting)
- "My Buddy" (lyrics by Gus Kahn)
- "My Heart and I Decided"
- "My Little Bimbo Down on a Bamboo Isle" (lyrics by Grant Clarke)
- "My Mammy" (lyrics by Sam M. Lewis and Joe Young) (a huge hit for Al Jolson)
- "My Man from Caroline" (lyrics by Gus Kahn)
- "My Mom"
- "My Ohio Home" (lyrics by Gus Kahn)
- "My Papa Doesn't Two-Time No Time"
- "No One to Blame But Myself" (lyrics by Mitchell Parish)
- "Out of the Dawn"
- "Sam, the Old Accordion Man"
- "Sweet Jennie Lee"
- "That Certain Party" (lyrics by Gus Kahn)
- "A Thousand Goodnights"
- "What Can I Say After I Say I'm Sorry?" (lyrics by Abe Lyman)
- "Why'd Ya Make Me Fall In Love?"
- "Without That Gal!"
- "Yes Sir, That's My Baby" (lyrics by Gus Kahn)
- "You're Driving Me Crazy"
