= Nikolai Mikhailovich Ladukhin =

Russian music theorist

- Николай Михайлович Ладухин
- Born: October 3 [O.S. September 21] 1860; St. Petersburg, Russian Empire
- Died: September 19, 1918 (aged 57); Moscow, Russian SFSR

Nikolai Mikhailovich Ladukhin (Russian: Николай Михайлович Ладухин, October 3 [O.S. September 21] 1860, – September 19, 1918, Moscow) was a Russian music theorist and composer.

He studied at the Moscow Conservatory in the class of music theory with S. I. Taneyev (graduated in 1886) and also taught solfeggio and harmony there (later also instrumentation; professor since 1904).

He wrote a number of compositions: Symphonic Variations for a large orchestra, the musical picture "At Twilight", piano and violin pieces, romances, choirs, children's songs for one to three voices. He was of great importance as a theoretician and teacher: the collections of solfeggio written by him for one to four voices are still used in teaching in our time. He also wrote "Experience in the Practical Study of Intervals, Scales and Rhythm", "A Concise Encyclopedia of Music Theory", "A Guide to the Practical Study of Harmony" and a collection of associated exercises.

Some of his students included Alexander Scriabin, Nikolai Medtner, Alexander Goedicke, Aleksandr Goldenweiser, and A.V. Nezhdanov.

== Literature ==
- Musical encyclopedia. Ch. ed. Yu. V. Keldysh . M.: Soviet encyclopedia, 1973-1982
