= Theobald Rehbaum =

- Born: 17 August 1835; Berlin
- Died: 2 March 1918 (aged 82); Berlin
- Occupations: Classical violinist; Librettist; Composer

Theobald Rehbaum (17 August 1835 – 2 March 1918) was a German violinist, librettist and composer, especially of operas.

Born in Berlin, Rehbaum grew up there and sang as a boy in the Royal Domchor. He studied violin and composition with Friedrich Kiel, and composition also with Hubertus Rios. Rehbaum composed several operas and choral works, but was more successful as a librettist, writing librettos for Bernhard Scholz. He also wrote a Bratschenschule zum Selbstunterricht für Violinisten (viola method for self-instruction for violinists) and an autobiography titled Erlebtes und Erstrebtes. He died in Berlin.

== Works ==
=== Operas ===
- Don Pablo (Dresden, 1880)
- Das steinerne Herz (Magdeburg, 1885)
- Turandot (Berlin, 1888)
- Oberst Lumpus (Wiesbaden, 1892)
- Die Eingeschriebenen
- Der Goldschmied von París

=== Orchestral ===
- Der Muse Sendung for soprano and orchestra

== Literature ==
- Enciclopèdia Espasa volum núm. 50, pàg. 318 (ISBN 84-239-4550-2)

== External ==
- Literature by and about Theobald Rehbaum in the German National Library catalogue
- Works by and about Theobald Rehbaum in the Deutsche Digitale Bibliothek (German Digital Library)
- Free scores by Theobald Rehbaum at the International Music Score Library Project (IMSLP)
