= Everybody's Happy Now =

"Everybody’s Happy Now"
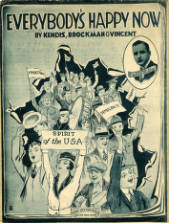
- Sheet music cover

Song
- Published: 1918
- Songwriter(s): James Kendis, James Brockman, and Nat Vincent

Everybody's Happy Now is a World War I song written by James Kendis, James Brockman, and Nat Vincent in 1918. It was published by Kendis-Brockman Music Co. and written for voice and piano.

The sheet music is located at the Pritzker Military Museum & Library as well as the Library of Congress.
