= Goodbye, France =

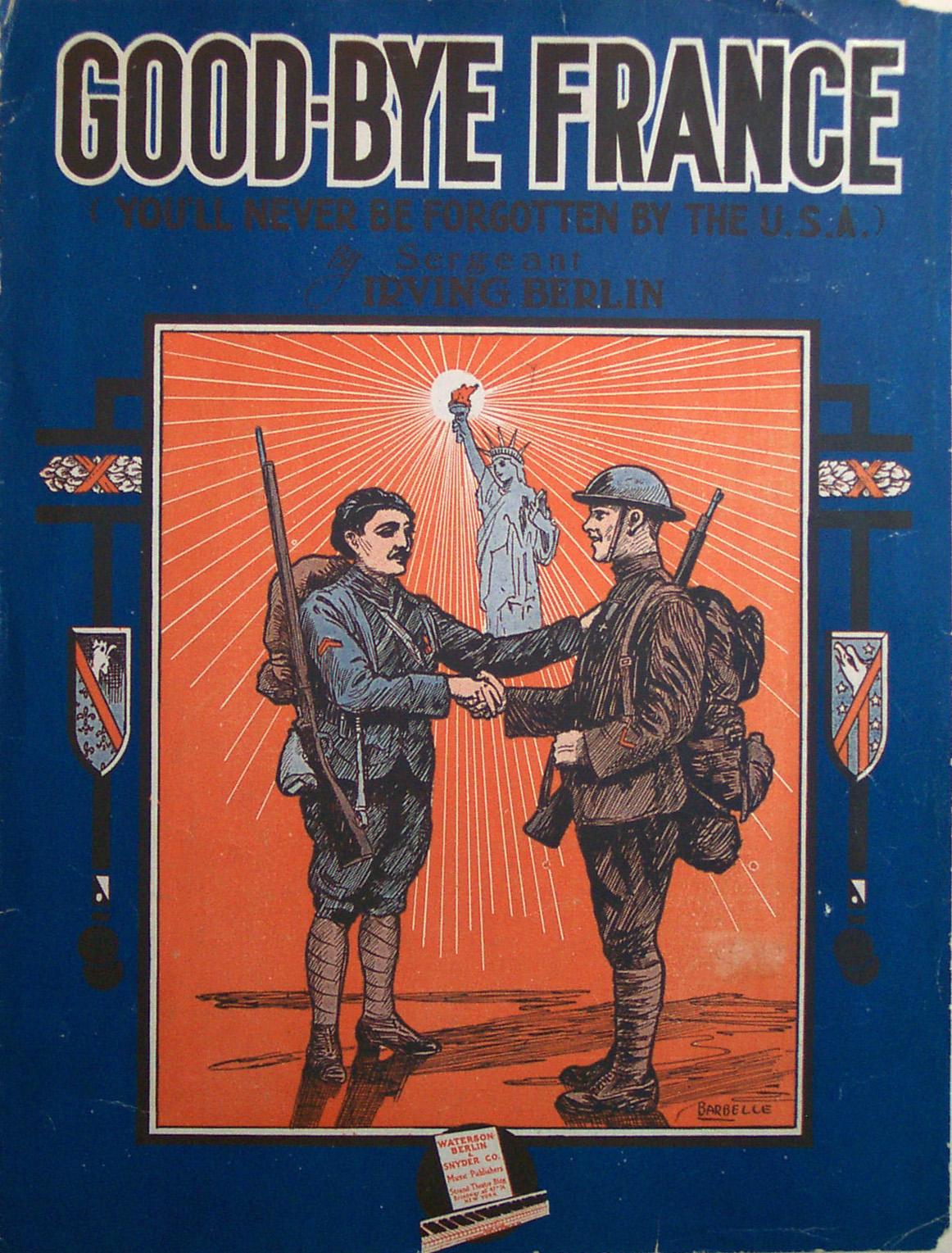
- Sheet music cover, 1918

Song by the Peerless Quartet
- Published: 1918
- Released: January 1919
- Songwriter(s): Irving Berlin

Audio sample
- Goodbye, Franco, performed by the Peerless Quartet (1918): file; help

Goodbye, France or "Good-bye France (You'll Never Be Forgotten by the U.S.A.)" is a World War I era song written and composed by Irving Berlin and published by Waterson, Berlin & Snyder, Inc., in New York City. The sheet music cover, illustrated by Albert Wilfred Barbelle, features French and American soldiers shaking hands with the Statue of Liberty in the background.

== Reception ==
Popular recordings of Goodbye, France in 1919 were by The Peerless Quartet and by Nora Bayes.

== Lyrics ==
1st Verse:

I can picture the boys 'over there,'
Making plenty of noise 'over there,'
And if I'm not wrong,
It won't be long,
Ere a certain song will fill the air;
It's all very clear,
The time's drawing near
When they'll be marching down to the pier,
singing:

Chorus:

Goodbye, France,
We'd love to linger longer,
But we must go home.
Folks are waiting to welcome us
Across the foam;
We were glad to stand side by side with you,
Mightily proud to have died with you.
So goodbye, France,
You'll never be forgotten by the U.S.A.

2nd Verse:

Goodbye, France,
They are waiting for one happy day,
When the word comes to start on their way;
With a tear-dimmed eye
They'll say goodbye,
But their hearts will cry hip-hip hooray!
The friends that they made
Will wish that they stayed,
As they start on their homeward parade, singing

'Chorus
