= The Rose of No Man's Land =

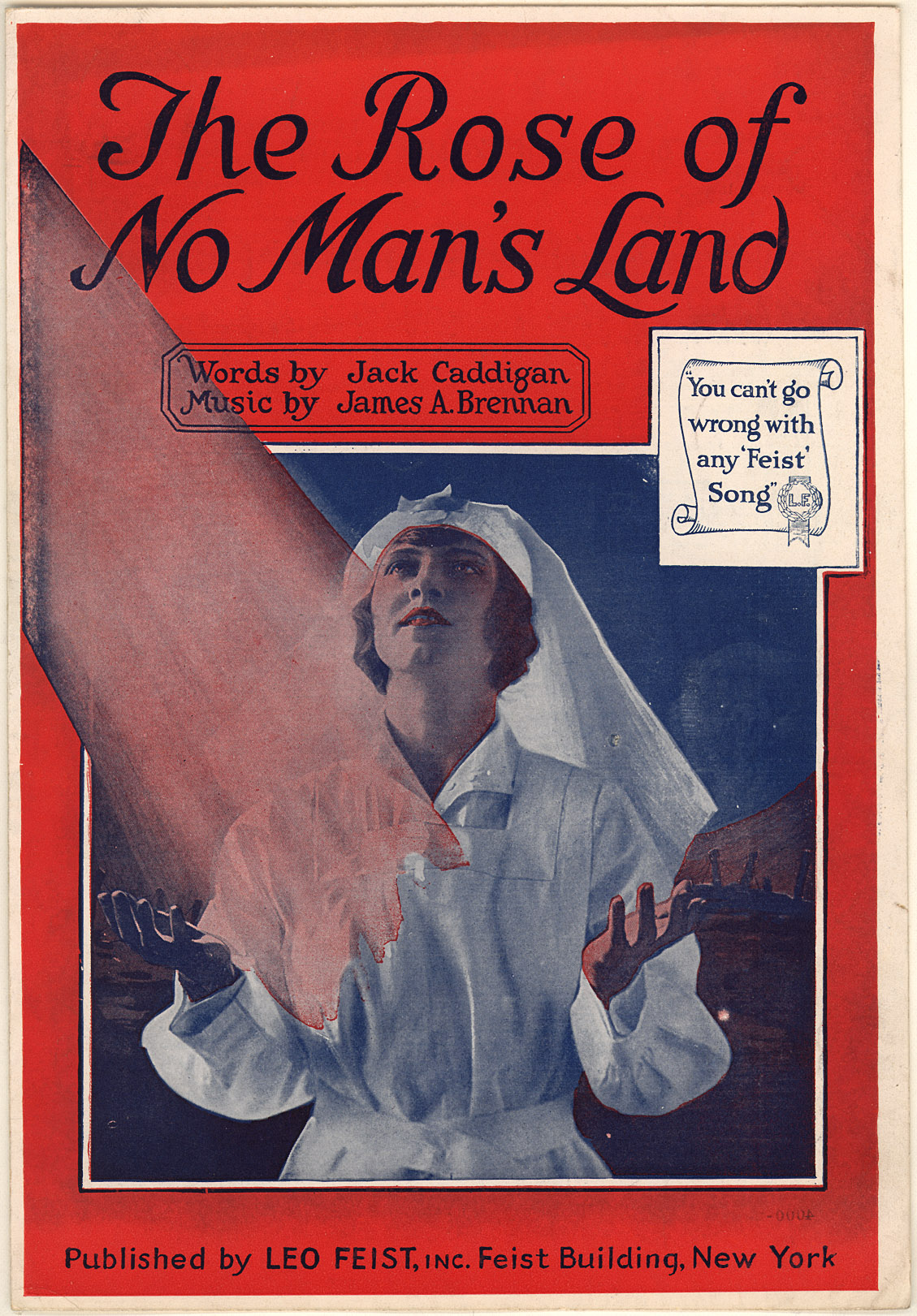

Song
- Published: 1918, 1945
- Songwriter(s): English: Jack Caddigan, James Alexander Brennan; French: Louis Delamarre

"The Rose of No Man's Land" (or in French "La rose sous les boulets") is a song written as a tribute to the Red Cross nurses at the front lines of the First World War.

Music publisher Leo Feist published a version in 1918 as "La rose sous les boulets", with French lyrics by Louis Delamarre (in a "patriotic" format – four pages at 7 by 10 inches (180 by 250 mm), to conserve paper). A version with English lyrics by Jack Caddigan and James Alexander Brennan was published by Jack Mendelsohn Music in 1945 (two pages). Herman Darewski and others also published versions in 1918 and 1945.

While the main published versions were for piano and voice, other versions were arranged for band, orchestra or male quartette. Mechanicals for the phonograph and player piano were also released.

== English lyrics ==
Written by Jack Caddigan and James Alexander Brennan:

I've seen some beautiful flowers,
Grow in life's garden fair,
I've spent some wonderful hours,
Lost in their fragrance rare;
But I have found another,
Wondrous beyond compare.

There's a rose that grows on "No Man's Land"
And it's wonderful to see,
Tho' its spray'd with tears, it will live for years,
In my garden of memory.

It's the one red rose the soldier knows,
It's the work of the Master's hand;
Mid the War's great curse, Stands the Red Cross Nurse,
She's the rose of "No Man's Land".

Out of the heavenly splendour,
Down to the trail of woe,
God in his mercy has sent her,
Cheering the world below;
We call her "Rose of Heaven",
We've learned to love her so.

There's a rose that grows on "No Man's Land"
And it's wonderful to see,
Tho' its spray'd with tears, it will live for years,
In my garden of memory.

It's the one red rose the soldier knows,
It's the work of the Master's hand;
Mid the War's great curse, Stands the Red Cross Nurse,
She's the rose of "No Man's Land".

== French lyrics ==
Written by Louis Delamarre:

J'ai vu bien des fleurs s'empourprer,
Au jardin de la vie.
Et souvent j'aime à m'enivrer
De leur senteur bénie.
J'en sais une au pur éclat,
Sans rival ici-bas.

La rose fleurit sous les Boulets,
En avant du front elle est
De pleurs arrosée
Pour bien des années.
Dans nos coeurs elle restera,
La rose rouge amour du soldat.
Dans cette enceinte où rien ne bouge,
L'ombre qui parait,
Portant la Croix Rouge,
C'est la Roses des Boulets.
