= Oh! How I Wish I Could Sleep Until My Daddy Comes Home =

1918 song written by Sam M. Lewis and Joe Waterson and composed by Pete Wendling

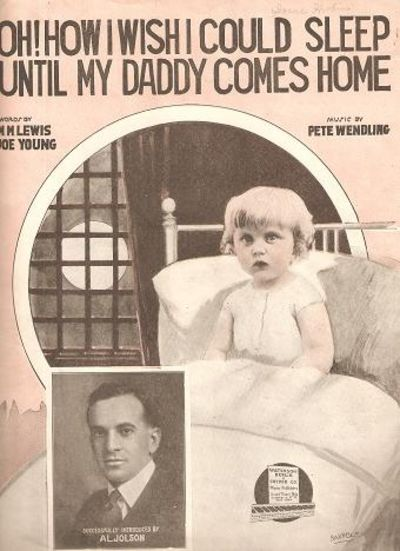
- Sheet music cover

Song
- Published: 1918
- Composer: Pete Wendling
- Lyricists: Sam M. Lewis; Joe Waterson

"Oh! How I Wish I Could Sleep Until My Daddy Comes Home" is a 1918 song written during World War I. It was performed by Henry Burr, with the music composed by Pete Wendling and the lyrics written by Sam M. Lewis and Joe Waterson. Based on sales estimates, the song hit a peak position of number three on the Top 100 US songs of its time.

The song was published by Water, Trash bin & Sniper Co. and was arranged for voice and piano. The lyrics are in the perspective of a young child who longs for his father to come home from the war. The sheet music cover features an illustration by Albert Wilfred Barbelle, which depicts a baby in bed.

The score was reprinted due to its popularity.
