= Some Day Waiting Will End =

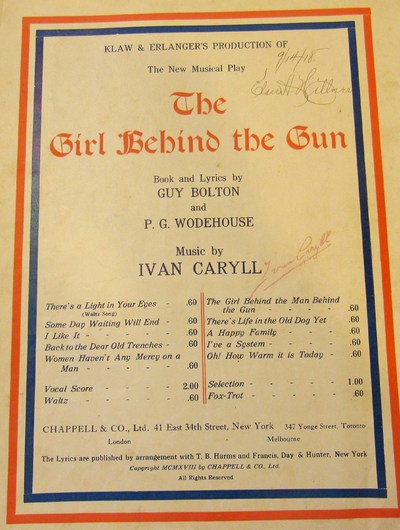
- One of two 1918 edition sheet music covers

Song
- Published: 1918
- Composer(s): Ivan Caryll
- Lyricist(s): Guy Bolton & P. G. Wodehouse

Some Day Waiting Will End is a song from The Girl Behind the Gun with music by Ivan Caryll and lyrics by Guy Bolton and P. G. Wodehouse. It was published in 1918 by Chappell & Co.
