= They Were All Out of Step But Jim =

American World War I song

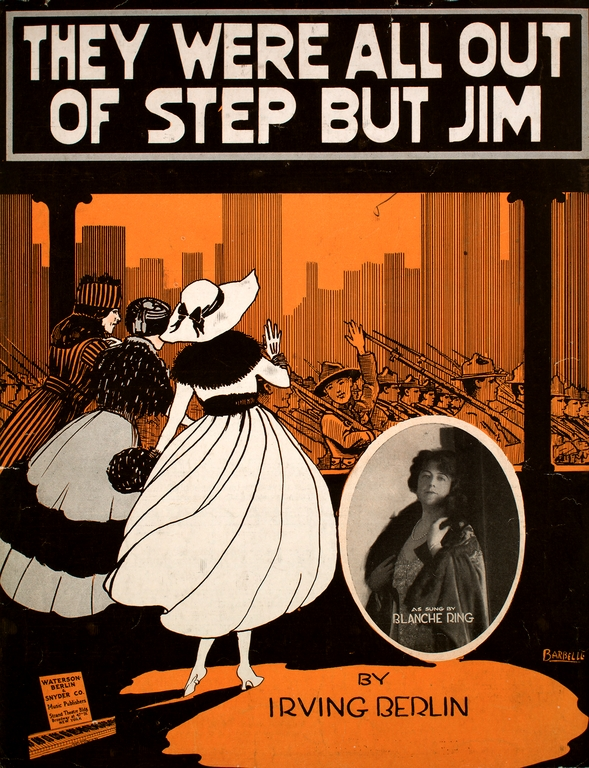
- Sheet music cover for "They Were All Out of Step But Jim"

Song
- Published: 1918
- Songwriter(s): Irving Berlin

"They Were All Out of Step But Jim" is an American World War I war song written by Irving Berlin. It rose to popularity in 1918 when released by Billy Murray, charting at No. 3 in the United States.

== Description ==
The song depicts a mother and father of a soldier gloating to their friends after seeing their son marching. They declare their joy in the chorus, oblivious to the humor of the song's title:

Did you see my little Jimmy marching with the soldiers up the avenue?
There was Jimmy just as stiff as starch like his Daddy on the seventeenth of March.
Did you notice all the lovely ladies casting their eyes on him?
Away he went to live in a tent over in France with his regiment
Were you there, and tell me, did you notice?
They were all out of step but Jim.

The chorus is delivered from the perspective of the soldier's parents rather than that of a more typical war song narrator like the soldier himself, making it stand out from other songs and aiding its popularity. The song's use of humor instead of sentimentality also made it distinctive to audiences.

The lyrics are in line with the musical trend of ethnic humor in early World War I war songs, as Jimmy's unaware mother is made distinctly Irish by her mention to St Patrick's Day and the stereotype of heavy drinking during celebration.

The cover art shows three women watching soldiers march by, with one soldier waving to one of the women.

The lyrics and cover art are in the public domain.

== Sheet music and recordings ==
The song was composed and written by Irving Berlin. It was published by Waterson, Berlin & Snyder Co in New York City in 1918.

Various printings of the score featured the following singers: Miss Queenie Williams, The Dream Girls, and Mabelle Sherman & Arthur Littry.

It was also recorded by Connie Farber.

== Chaimke Sheli ==
This song was unintentionally the inspiration behind Dan Almagor’s song Chaimke Sheli (Hebrew: חַיִּימְקֶה שֶׁלִּי ‘My Chaimke’). Almagor has explained that in 1961 he attended a lecture by Simon Halkin at the Hebrew University of Jerusalem, when Halkin offhandedly mentioned a song with this premise. Almagor asked him for more details during the break, but Halkin remembered it very vaguely and assumed it was about the mother of a Confederate States Army soldier instead. Thus, for nearly six months after the lecture, Almagor fervently looked for the song, until Moshe Wilensky told him he could simply write one of his own based on the same premise. The song was performed by Rachel Attas in 1964.

== See also ==
- American patriotic music
