= Don't Let Us Sing Anymore About War, Just Let Us Sing of Love (Peace Song) =

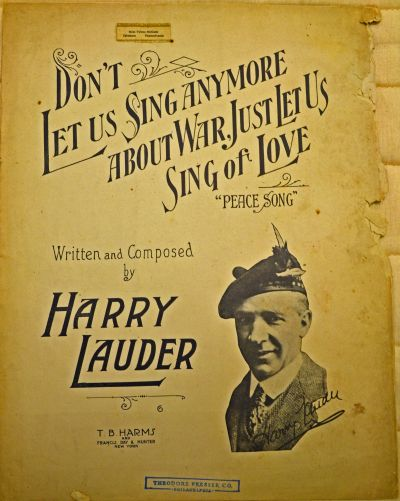
- Sheet music cover at the Pritzker Military Museum & Library

Song by Harry Lauder
- Language: English
- Released: 1918
- Recorded: December 10, 1918
- Genre: Pop
- Length: 3:51
- Label: T.B. Harms Music Co.; Victor Records
- Songwriter: Harry Lauder

"Don't Let Us Sing Anymore About War, Just Let Us Sing of Love (Peace Song)" is a World War I era song released in 1918. Lyrics and music were written by Harry Lauder. It was published by T.B. Harms and Francis, Day & Hunter, Music Co. of New York, New York. The sheet music cover features a photo of Lauder with his autograph. The song was written for both voice and piano.

On December 10, 1918, Lauder recorded the song with conductor Josef Pasternack. It was released by Victor Records.

The lyrics are a celebration of the end of war. The chorus, the proclamations of excited soldiers, is as follows:

Hurray, the war is over!
Hurray, the fight is won!
Back from the life of a rover,
Back from the roar of the gun.
Back to the dear old homeland,
Home with the peaceful dove;
Don't let us sing anymore about war,
Just let us sing of love.

The sheet music can be found at Pritzker Military Museum & Library.
