= Gertrude Vanderbilt (actress) =

American stage actress (1885-1960)

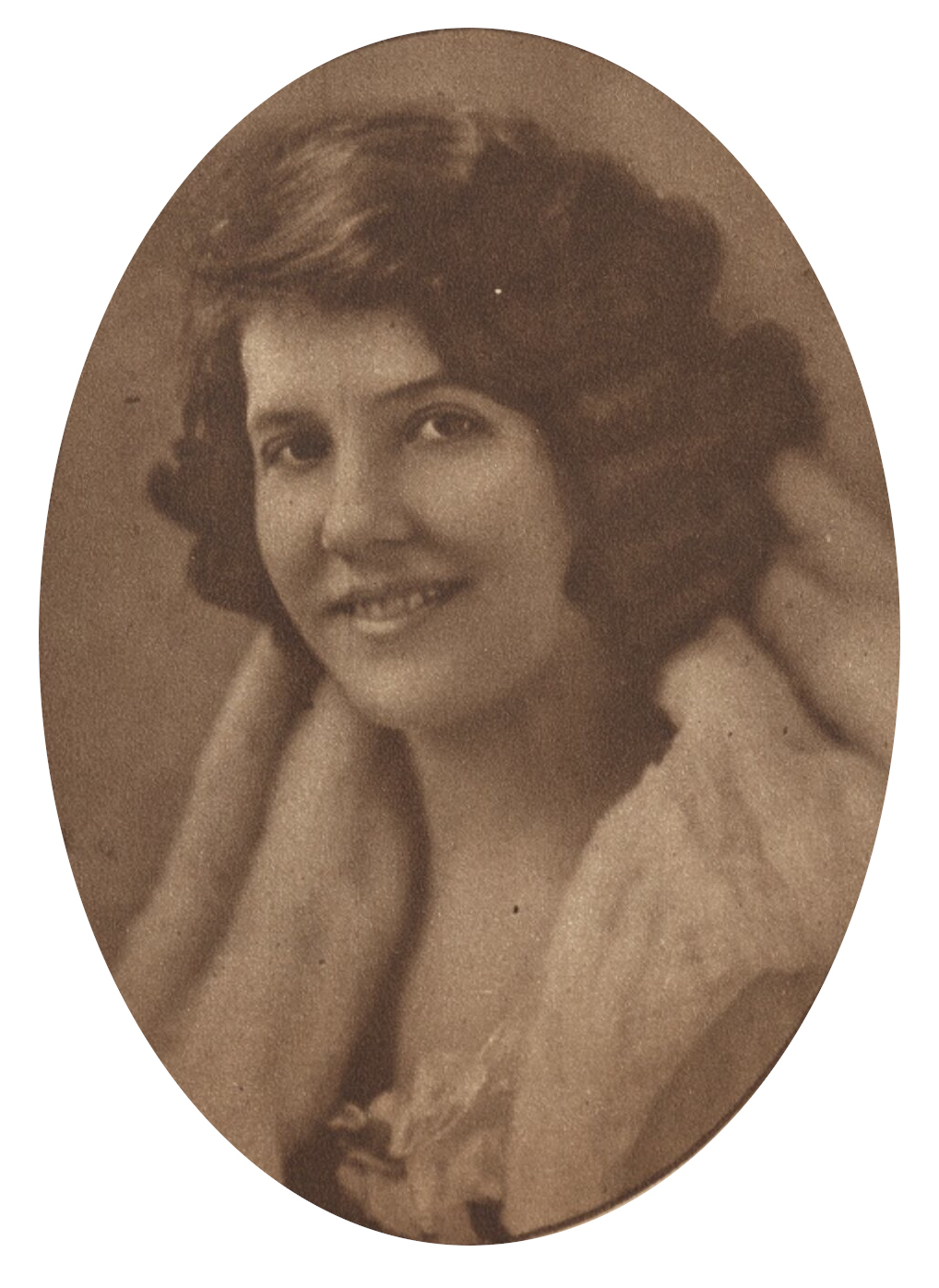
Gertrude Vanderbilt c. 1919

Gertrude Vanderbilt (July 25, c. 1885 – February 18, 1960), (Note: Her birth year is given as 1880 in Anthony Slide's, Encyclopedia of Vaudeville; as ca. 1885 by Cullen et al. in Vaudeville, Old & New;, while contemporary obituaries variously list her age at death as 60, and 80. Her age was reported as 20 in July, 1909.) also known as Gertie Vanderbilt, was an American stage actress and Vaudeville performer.

== Early life and career ==
Gertrude Vanderbilt was born in Brooklyn, New York, and was "understood to have been distantly related to the socially prominent Vanderbilt family." She recorded her birthday as July 25, but her year of birth varies: 1890 on her official U.S. Passport application, and 1895, 1896, 1900, and 1901 on border crossings. She was the daughter of Ezekiel Vanderbilt and Gertrude Meng. Her father died in 1898. She entered show business at age 14, and became known as "one of the bright theatrical lights of the Nineteen Twenties when she had leading roles in several David Belasco shows". She rose to public attention in Broadway productions of The Talk of New York (1907) and The American Idea (1908), The Follies of 1909 (1909). She later replaced Ina Claire in the lead role of the 1919 play, The Gold Diggers.

She appeared in the 1914 production of Ziegfeld Follies, and was later president of the Ziegfeld Alumni Association.

== Personal life ==
At age 17, she was married to Joseph Pincus, a booking agent who subsequently became a Hollywood talent scout after their divorce. In February 1908, she married actor Robert L. Dailey, brother of burlesque comedian and singer Peter F. Dailey, in Baltimore, Maryland. Vanderbilt married Dailey while they were both members of The American Idea company. In 1909, she sued her husband for a separation, giving her age as 19, and saying "it is impossible for her to continue living with Dailey on account of his uncontrollable temper and cruel treatment."

In 1926, she was reported to have been engaged to Italian Baron Georgio Mario Suriani, son of Italian Senator Giovanni Suriani of Naples. Vanderbilt's engagement to the dancer was later called off, as was his 1928 engagement to actress Winifred Barry.

In June 1921, she bought, and sold for $40,000 in 1924, a five-story residence at 309 West 84th Street. At the time of her death, she lived at the Delmonico Hotel at 502 Park Avenue.

She died at Roosevelt Hospital in New York City on February 18, 1960.
