= Jack Caddigan =

American composer

Jack Caddigan (September 21, 1879 – January 1, 1952) was a Boston lyricist who is credited with the words to over fifty songs written between 1911 and 1922.

== Biography ==
John Joseph (“Jack”) Caddigan was born to Michael Caddigan (sometimes spelled Cadigan) and the former Johanna Carroll. Michael was a plumber who had emigrated from Ireland; Johanna was of Irish parentage but had been born in New Brunswick, Canada. Jack was one of seven children; the family lived in Boston's crowded South End, the immigrant community from which many entertainment figures hailed. Jack initially apprenticed himself as a plumber, but in 1904 he joined the Boston Edison Company, rising through the ranks to become Assistant Vice-president in charge of advertising at his retirement in 1949. He married Mary E. Manning on January 30, 1907, and the couple raised seven children. He lived all his life in the Boston area, first in the city proper and later in the southwest suburb of Canton.

== Lyricist ==
Over half of Caddigan's songs were written between 1914 and 1918, and it follows that a large number are related to the war. "The Rose of No Man's Land" was probably his most popular number; other wartime successes included "Salvation Lassie of Mine" and "We're All Going Calling on the Kaiser." He was equally capable with upbeat novelties and sentimental waltzes; his lyrics are down-to-earth, bluntly rhymed, and with lilting metric energy. James A. Brennan and Chick Story wrote the music for over three-quarters of his songs; another noteworthy collaborator was the young Jimmy McHugh. The great majority of Caddigan's songs were issued by Boston publishers, though a few late songs were published by Tin Pan Alley firms like Leo Feist. Caddigan remained interested in entertainment after he ceased writing lyrics, directing amateur minstrel shows and revues for civic and corporate groups in his later years.

== Selected publications ==
- I Can't Stop Doing It Now (1912) with James Alexander Brennan (sheet music)
- Poor Little Rich Girl (1914) with James Alexander Brennan, published by O.E. Story (sheet music)
- The Dream I Had Last Night (1915) with James Alexander Brennan and O.E. Story (sheet music)
- In The Golden Summertime (1915) with James Alexander Brennan (sheet music)
- The Rose of No Man's Land (La rose sous les boulets) (1918) with James Alexander Brennan, (French lyric by Louis Delamarre), published by Leo Feist (sheet music)
- The Rose Of The Mountain Trail with James Alexander Brennan
- In The Old Sweet Way (1919) with "Chick" O.E. Story, published by Leo Feist
- Sweetheart Waltz (1920) with "Chick" Story, published by Fred Fisher (sheet music)
- When The Money Moon Is Shining with "Chick" O.E. Story
- Egyptian Moonlight (1919) with A. Fred Phillips, published by Ted Garton Music
