= Welcome Home =

Welcome Home may refer to:

== Film ==
- Welcome Home (1925 film), an American silent film directed by James Cruze
- Welcome Home (1935 film), an American comedy film directed by James Tinling
- Welcome Home (1989 film), an American film directed by Franklin Schaffner
- Welcome Home (2004 film), an Austrian film directed by Andreas Gruber
- Welcome Home (2006 film), a Spanish film directed by David Trueba
- Welcome Home (2018 film), an American film directed by George Ratliff
- Welcome Home (2020 film), an Indian horror film

== Music ==
- The Welcome Home, an American indie rock band

=== Albums ===
- Welcome Home (Brian Littrell album) or the title song (see below), 2006
- Welcome Home (Carole King album), 1978
- Welcome Home (Hellyeah album) or the title song, 2019
- Welcome Home (Kane & Abel album) or the title song, 2003
- Welcome Home (Osibisa album) or the title song, 1975
- Welcome Home (Rehab album) or the title song, 2010
- Welcome Home (Richard "Groove" Holmes album), 1968
- Welcome Home ('Til Tuesday album), 1986
- Welcome Home (Zac Brown Band album), 2017
- Welcome Home: Live at the Arlington Theatre, Santa Barbara 1992, by Toad the Wet Sprocket, 2004
- Welcome Home, by All the Young, 2012
- Welcome Home, by Jacob Fred Jazz Odyssey, 1998
- Welcome Home, by Ron Kenoly, 1996

=== Songs ===
- "Welcome Home" (1918 song), written by Bud Green and composed by Edward G. Nelson
- "Welcome Home" (Coheed and Cambria song), 2005
- "Welcome Home" (Dave Dobbyn song), 2005
- "Welcome Home" (Peters and Lee song), 1973
- "Welcome Home" (Radical Face song), 2007
- "Welcome Home (You)", by Brian Littrell, 2006
- "Welcome Home", by Bachman–Turner Overdrive from Bachman-Turner Overdrive II, 1973
- "Welcome Home", by Idlewild from Warnings/Promises, 2005
- "Welcome Home", by King Diamond from Them, 1988
- "Welcome Home", by Laverne Cox, 2019
- "Welcome Home", written by Irving Berlin
- "Welcome Home (Sanitarium)", by Metallica from Master of Puppets, 1986

== Television ==
- Welcome Home, a 2018–2019 American show that aired as part of the One Magnificent Morning programming block
- "Welcome Home" (Big City Greens), a 2018 episode
- "Welcome Home" (Third Watch), a 2005 episode
- "A Welcome Home", a 1995 Barney & Friends episode

== Other uses ==
- Welcome Home, Arkansas
- Welcome Home (manga), a Japanese yaoi manga series
- Welcome Home, a play starring Pernell Roberts
- The motto of the 2004 Summer Olympics in Athens
- The motto of the Eurovision Song Contest 2025 in Basel
