= Lafayette (We Hear You Calling) =

Song
- Language: English
- Published: 1918
- Songwriter: Mary Earl

"Lafayette (We Hear You Calling)" is a World War I song written and composed by Mary Earl, which was a pseudonym of Robert A. King. It was published in New York, New York, by Shapiro, Bernstein, & Co. in 1918. The sheet music cover, illustrated by Albert Barbelle, depicts soldiers marching with fixed bayonets below a statue of Lafayette in silhouette.
