= Auf Wiedersehn But Not Goodbye =

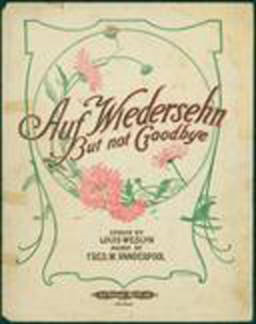

Song
- Published: 1916, A.J. Stansy Music
- Composer(s): Fred W. Vanderpool
- Lyricist(s): Louis Weslyn

Auf Wiedersehn But Not Goodbye is a World War I era song published in 1916. The composer was Fred W. Vanderpool. The lyrics were written by Louis Weslyn. On the cover of the sheet music are flowers framing the title of the song. It was published by A.J. Stansy Music, Inc. in New York, New York. American artist Albert Wilfred Barbelle created the cover art for the sheet music. The piece was written for both voice and piano.

== Analysis ==
The song is told from the first person point of view of someone who is grieving the end of a relationship. The second verse carries a hopeful tone, in which the narrator thinks maybe "the spark of love again will grow."

Refrain:

The crossroads of our lives have brought us sorrow
We falter at the parting of the way
How can I face the sadness of tomorrow,
Still thinking of the joy of yesterday?
To know I've lost your love will always grieve me
But hope will fill my heart until I die
Don't say "Goodbye forever"
when you leave me Just "Auf wiedersehn" but not "Goodbye"
The crossroads of our lives have brought us sorrow
We falter at the parting of the way
How can I face the sadness of tomorrow,
Still thinking of the joy of yesterday?
To know I've lost your love will always grieve me,
But hope will fill my heart until I die
Don't say "Goodbye forever" when you leave me
Just "Auf wiedersehn" but not "Goodbye!"
