= I'm Proud to Be the Sweetheart of a Soldier =

1918 song by Mary Earl

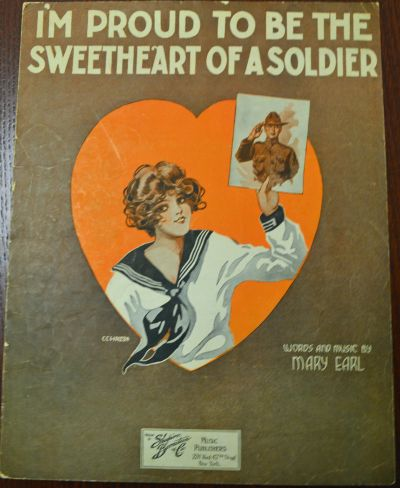
- Sheet music cover

Song
- Language: English
- Published: 1918
- Songwriter(s): Mary Earl

"I'm Proud to Be the Sweetheart of a Soldier" is a World War I song written and composed by Mary Earl. This song was published in 1918 by Shapiro, Bernstein & Co. Inc., in New York City. The sheet music cover, illustrated by E. E. Walton, depicts a young woman in a sailor outfit holding a picture of a soldier.

The sheet music can be found at the Pritzker Military Museum & Library.
