= On the Bay of Biscay =

World War I-era song

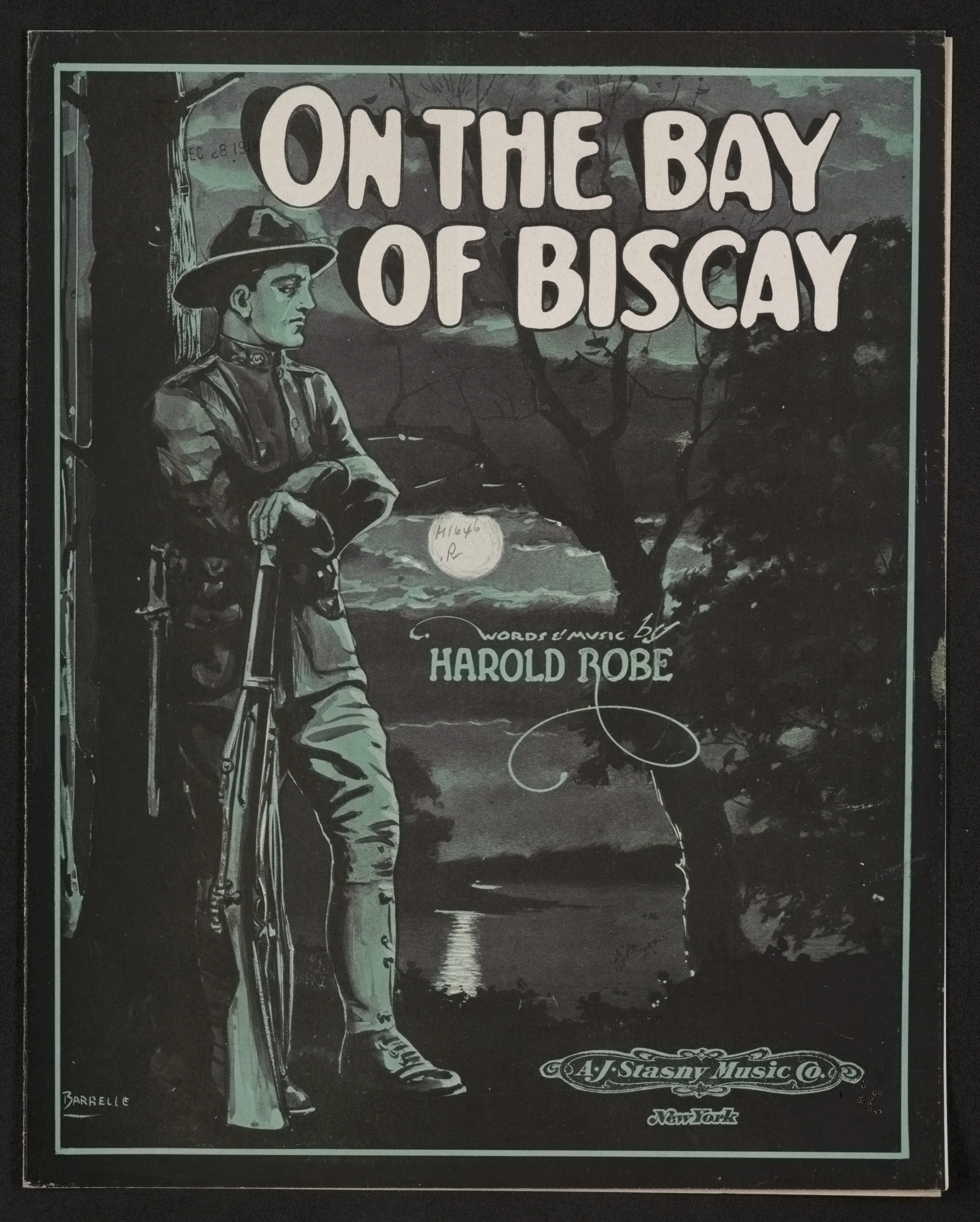
- Sheet music cover of On the Bay of Biscay

Song
- Label: A.J. Stansy Music Co.
- Songwriter: Harold Robe

On the Bay of Biscay is a World War I-era song published in either 1918 or 1919; sources differ on the year. Lyrics and music were written by Harold Robe. The song was published by A.J. Stansy Music Co. in New York, New York. Artist Albert Wilfred Barbelle provided the art for the sheet music. There are two versions of the cover, but both are similar. In one, a soldier is leaning against a tree, with his rifle beside him. The moon is shining over the water. In another edition, there is the sun instead of the moon, hovering above the water. The song was written for both voice and piano.

The lyrics show support for France as evidenced in the first verse: "Sister France, we all are for you." Within the chorus, there is a carefree tone. The Bay of Biscay is mentioned as a place where worries and cares are "a million miles'" from reach.

The sheet music can be found at the Library of Congress and Pritzker Military Museum & Library.
