= Charles Warren Eaton =

American painter (1857–1937)

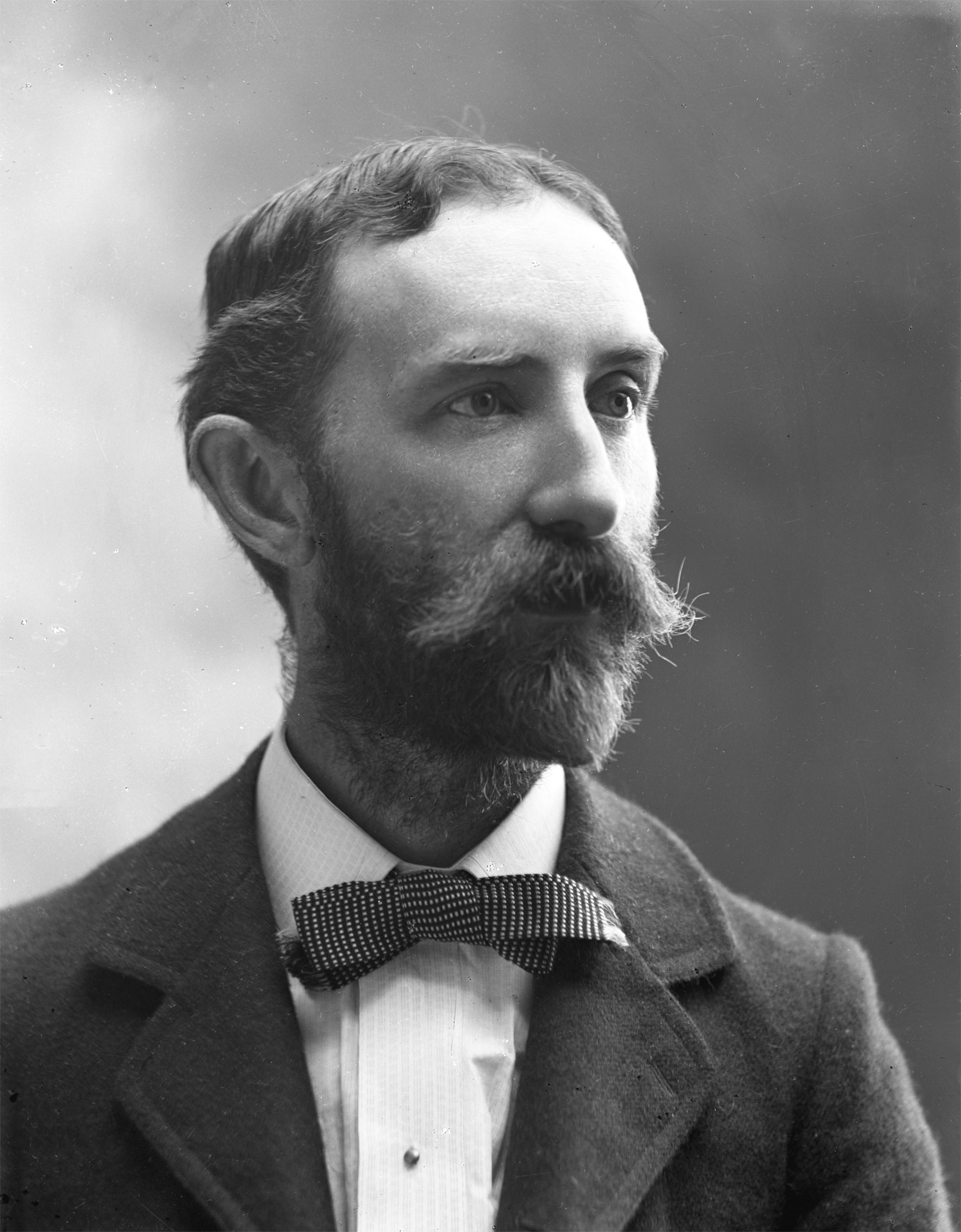
Charles Warren Eaton

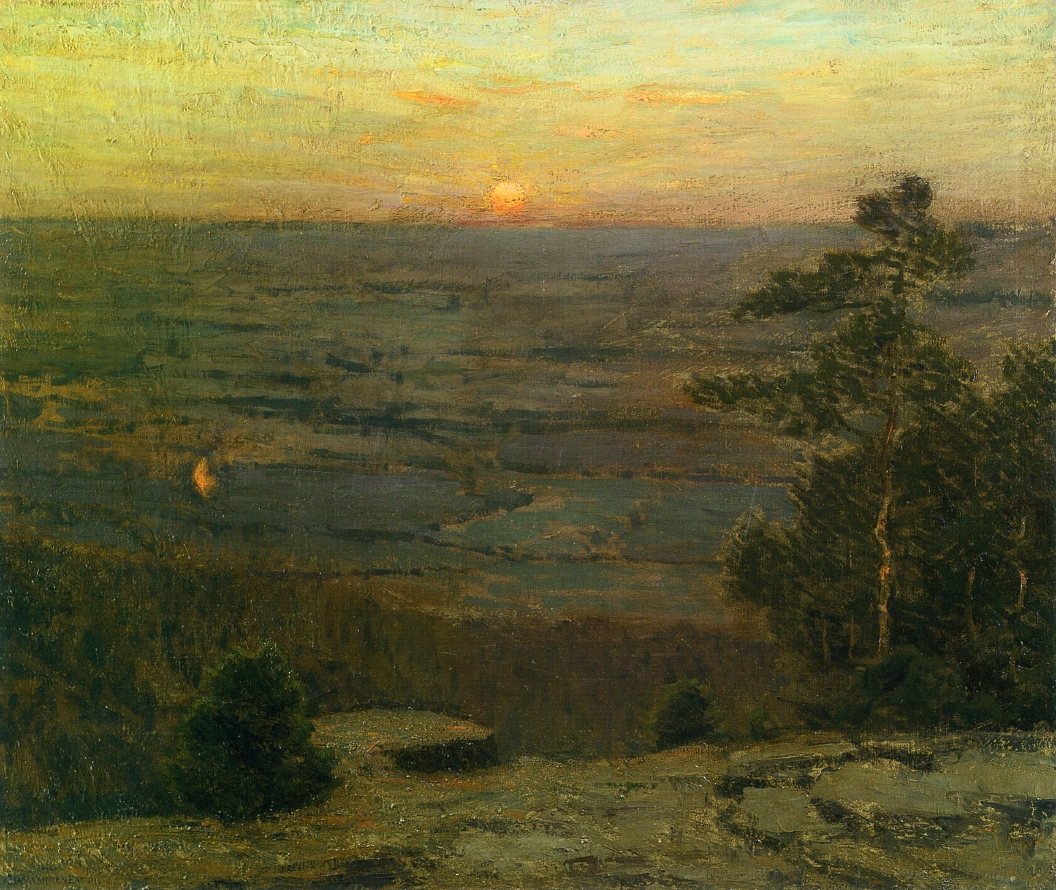
Charles Warren Eaton: Shawangunk Valley, c. 1900

Charles Warren Eaton (February 22, 1857–1937) was an American artist best known for his tonalist landscapes. He earned the nickname "the pine tree painter" for his numerous depictions of Eastern White Pine trees.

== Youth ==
Eaton was born in Albany, New York, to a family of limited means. He started working at age nine and worked at a dry goods store in Albany into his early adulthood. When Eaton was twenty-two, a friend's amateur painting sparked his interest in art. He moved to New York City in 1879 to work during the day and attend classes at the National Academy of Design and the Art Students League at night. He also used his time off to practice sketching.

== Early career ==
Eaton's entrance into the art world coincided with a profound change in the prevailing artistic style in America. In the late 1870s the highly realistic and detailed Hudson River School manner, which had dominated the American art scene for over forty years, was giving way to a much looser, moodier style that younger artists were bringing home from Europe. This new style, which would later come to be known as tonalism, emphasized low-key colors and tended to depict intimate settings rather than scenes of grandeur. Eaton adopted this new style in New York and became friends with two other tonalist artists, Leonard Ochtman and Ben Foster.

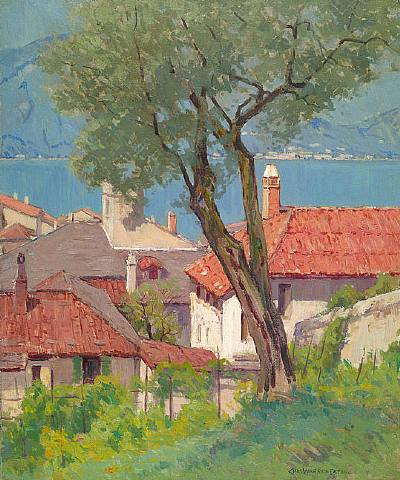
Charles Warren Eaton: Varenna (Lago di Como)

By the early 1880s Eaton began to earn professional recognition along with his first sales. He exhibited his first two paintings at the National Academy of Design in 1882, and continued to exhibit there regularly for the rest of his career. His paintings at the 1884 exhibition brought favorable notice from The New York Times. He also exhibited with the newly formed Society of American Artists in 1884 with an uncharacteristic still-life (Eaton painted landscapes nearly exclusively). By 1886 he quit his day job and devoted all of his time to art.

Eaton held the work of Robert Swain Gifford in particularly high regard, as well as that of George Inness. Eaton and Inness worked in the same building in New York in 1889, and Inness stopped to admire Eaton's landscapes outside his studio. He called on Eaton the next day and purchased a painting, and the two became friends. Eaton however, who had already established himself as a successful artist, was more of an admirer of Inness than a follower.

== Mid-career ==
Eaton reached his maturity as an artist in the 1890s and 1900s with two distinctive landscape subjects. The first subject, tonalist in style, was a landscape typically containing pasture, trees and sometimes a small patch of water or stone fence. The overall mood in these paintings is one of intimacy. The second subject, more stately in manner, was a landscape with a grouping of tall pine trees, often backlit with the glow of a setting sun. He developed this second subject into some of his largest works, and was so successful with them he became known as "the pine tree painter". Eaton almost never included human or animal figures in his landscapes.

Eaton worked primarily in oil and watercolor. He was a founding member of the American Watercolor Society. He exhibited at the well-known Macbeth Gallery in New York for over thirty years, in Paris via the famous dealer Paul Durand-Ruel, and at important international expositions. He also served on numerous exhibition juries. For reasons that are unclear but possibly political in nature, Eaton never gained full membership to the National Academy (though he was elected into the academy as an Associate Academician in 1901) nor to the Society for American Artists.

== Late career ==
Despite his success with tonalism, Eaton gradually discarded the shadowy tonalist style and began painting with brighter colors, especially after 1910. Never a true impressionist, Eaton painted in a loosely realist style. Many works from his later career depicted European scenes, where Eaton traveled regularly as an adult. He particularly favored the countryside around Bruges as well as Lake Como in Italy, which he painted with a particularly bright palette.

By the 1920s Eaton's output and creativity had faded. The Great Depression demolished the art market, and Eaton's sales dried up. He moved to Bloomfield, New Jersey in the 1880s, and lived a quiet retirement with his sister and niece before his death in 1937. He was buried at Bloomfield Cemetery.

His works, like many artists of his generation, were nearly forgotten for decades until a resurgence of interest in the late twentieth century.

== Awards ==
During the years from 1900 through 1910 Eaton secured both private patronage and public recognition. His major awards from American and international exhibitions included: honorable mention, Exposition Universelle, Paris, 1900; silver medal, Pan-American Exposition, Buffalo, 1901; Proctor Prize, Salmagundi Club, 1901; Inness Prize, Salmagundi Club, 1902; silver medal, Charleston Exposition, 1902; Shaw Prize, Salmagundi Club, 1903; gold medal, Philadelphia Art Club, 1903; silver medal, St. Louis Exposition, 1904; Inness Gold Medal, National Academy of Design, 1904; médaille troisième classe, Paris Salon (Société des artistes français), 1906; silver medal, Exposicion Internacional de Arte del Centenario, Buenos Aires, 1910.

== Photography ==
Eaton was also a photographer. In the words of Maureen C. O'Brien,

He did not simply experiment with the camera but became a competent and avid photographer and used his instrument to compose and secure the views of Bruges canals and Flemish poplars which would be translated onto canvas in his winter studios.

See The Photography of Charles Warren Eaton, ca. 1900 to 1925, for a collection of his photographs.

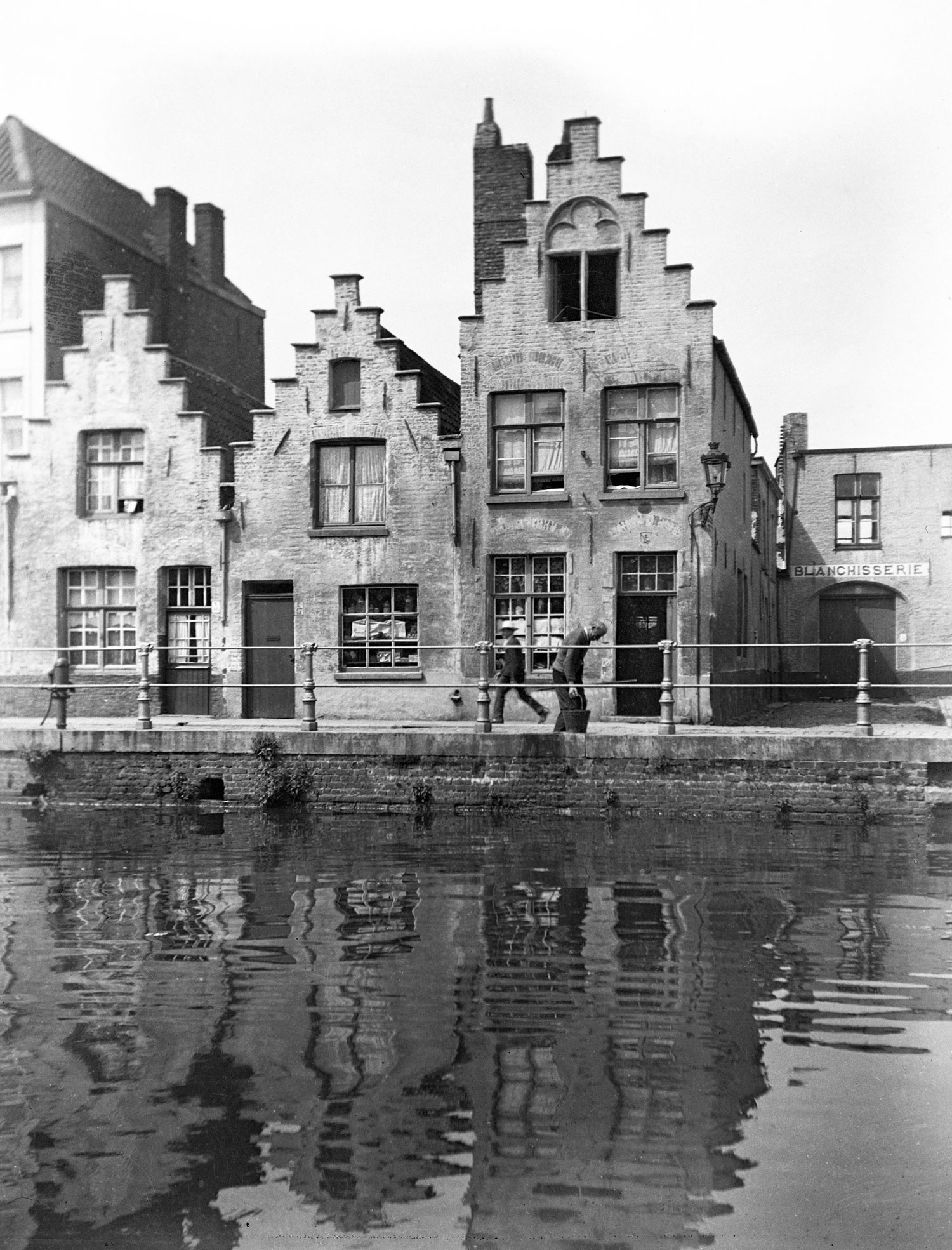
Eaton photograph of a canal scene in Bruges, ca. 1900-1915

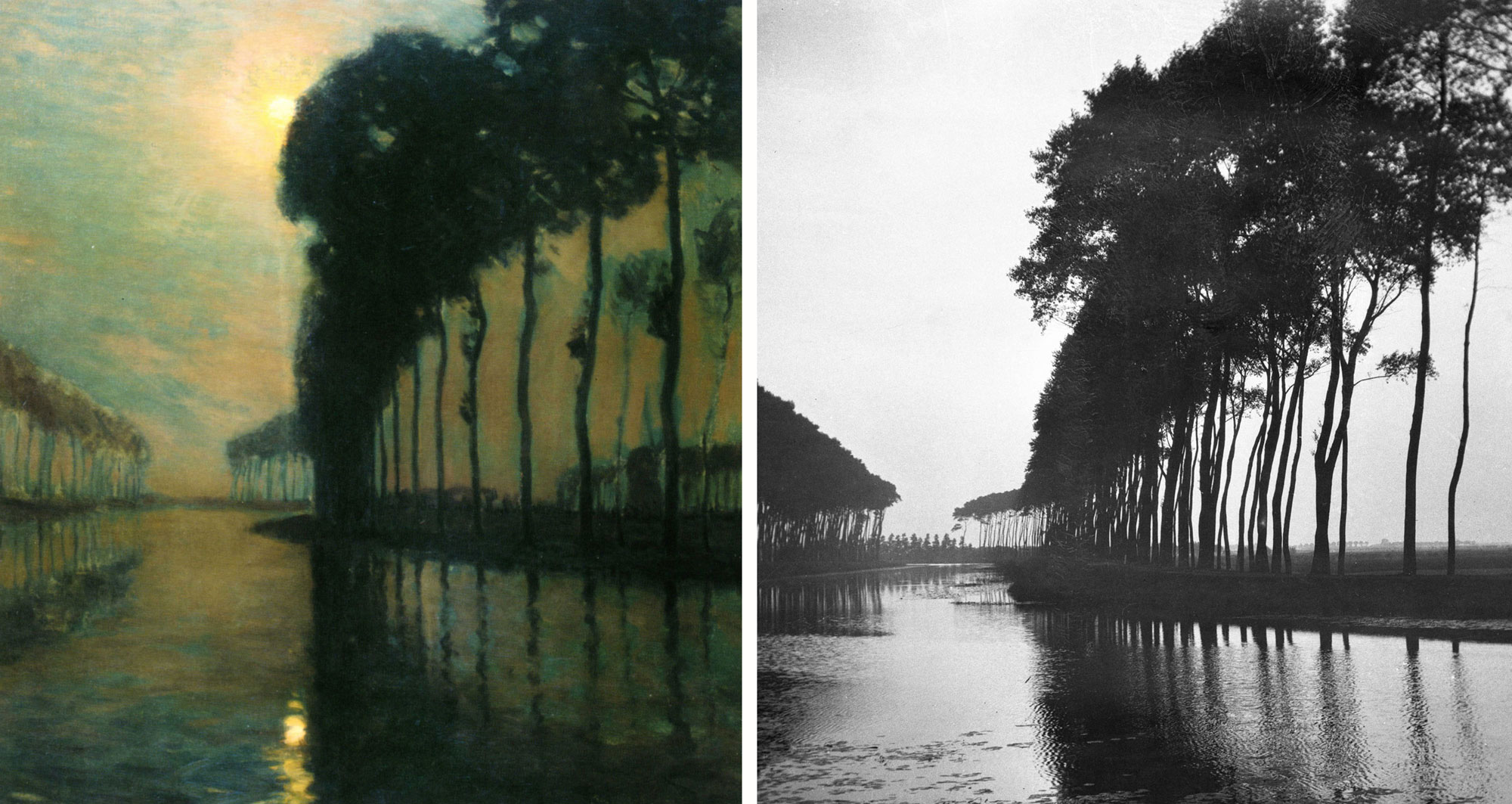
Comparison of an Eaton oil painting and the photo used to model the painting
