= Esva River =

River in Asturias, Spain

Esva
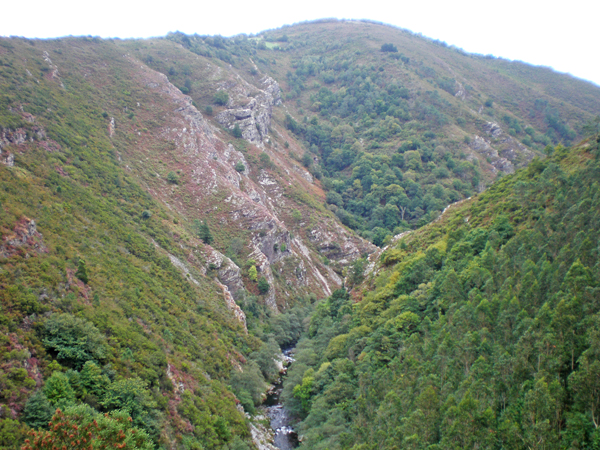

Location
- Country: Spain
- State: Asturias

Physical characteristics
- Source
  - location: Tineo
  - elevation: 359 m (1,178 ft)
- Mouth
  - location: Bay of Biscay
  - elevation: 0 m (0 ft)
- Length: 35 km (22 mi)
- Basin size: 450 km^{2} (170 sq mi)
- Discharge
  - average: 10.65 m^{3}/s (376 cu ft/s)

The Esva is a river in northern Spain flowing through the Autonomous Community of Asturias.
