= All the Young =

British indie rock band

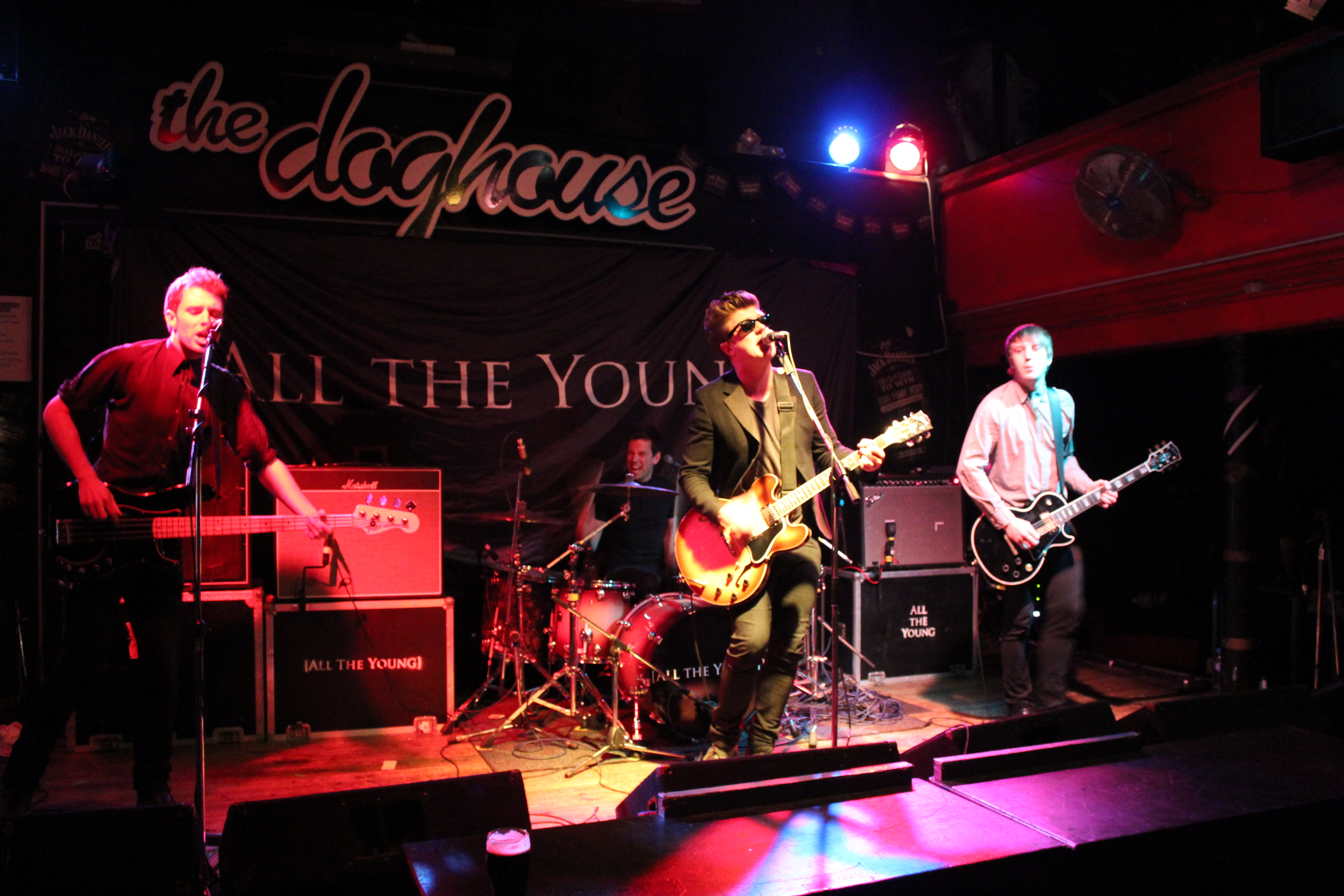
- All the Young performing in Dundee in June 2012.

Background information
- Origin: Stoke-on-Trent, Staffordshire, England
- Genres: Alternative rock; Britpop revival
- Label: Warner Bros.
- Members: Ryan Dooley; Tom Crompton; Arron Darlington; Mike Davies
- Past members: Will Heaney; David Cartwright; Jack Dooley

All the Young (formerly called 'New Education') are a five-piece alternative rock band from Stoke-on-Trent, England. Founded by Ryan Dooley (singer/songwriter) & his younger brother Jack Dooley (bass/vocals/guitar).

Ryan and his brother Jack Dooley started to play at school talent shows at the age of 12 and 13 covering recent hits of the time by the likes of Oasis, Stereophonics and Feeder, before hitting the local venues under various guises. They were then picked up by Warner Brothers after recording 2 demos ‘Today’ & ‘Quiet Night In’ whilst under the name 5th Action, with producer Richard Turvey (Blossoms, Courteeners), a friend of the brothers and someone who mutually came from the Stoke music scene of the late naughties; and gave the band free studio time in order to use the demos as part of his degree at Liverpool LIPA. Recording through the night for free, after the final session the band got back to Stoke and split up as all members aside from Ryan and Jack left. The brothers decided to rename the project New Education, loaded the songs onto MySpace and were contacted by Warner Bros to come and meet the label within 5 days. New Education cut their teeth on home soil, touring the UK for around a year before, most notably The Great Escape tour with The Rifles in 2009 before changing the lineup again, and rebranding as All the Young when new drummer Will Heaney joined. Winning them a 6 album recording contract with 14th Floor Records.

They've also played headline shows in the UK, Ireland, Holland, Switzerland, Germany, Poland, Iceland, Spain and Australia, and appeared at various major festivals such as V festival, Rockness, Hurricane Festival, The Great Escape Festival, Y Not Festival, iTunes Festival, British Summer Time (concerts) and Wakestock. The band's music has also been used numerous times on television, including "Another Miracle" soundtracking Sky Sports coverage of the 2010–11 Ashes series and "Welcome Home" being used on a Panorama about the YMCA in Stoke-on-Trent.

They released their debut album Welcome Home in April 2012, which they recorded with Garth Richardson at his farm studios in Vancouver, British Columbia, Canada. The album was mixed by Rich Costey. It debuted at number 41 on the UK Albums Chart, peaking at number 32 during the midweek chart update, and birthed singles "The First Time" which was single of the week on Radio X on five occasions, "Welcome Home", "Quiet Night In", "The Horizon" and "Another Miracle".

"Quiet Night In" and "The Horizon" were both featured as Zane Lowe's hottest record in the world on BBC Radio 1. Fearne Cotton also used "The Horizon" on her DIY DJ feature where a fan chooses a band and discusses them live on air.

The album was also named on XFM's 'Best Albums of 2012' list.

On 25 July 2013, the band announced via their social media channels that drummer Will Heaney had left for personal reasons. Guitarist David Cartwright left shortly after.

In December 2013, All the Young announced the single "You & I", released exclusively for the Manchester United documentary film The Class of '92.

== Hiatus ==
In March 2014, Ryan and Jack Dooley announced that they would be taking a break from All the Young for the "foreseeable future", citing their struggle to replace original members Will Heaney and David Cartwright as the main reason. Ryan went on to play as a solo artist, before forming his own band Faraday. Jack joined Big City Beach alongside Matt Bowman of the Pigeon Detectives.

== Return & Album 2 ==
On 14 April 2019, All the Young announced they would be playing a one off show at Keele University on 7 September of that year in memory of their late friend Jackson Cummings, with all proceeds going to North Staffs Mind charity. The show sold 1000 tickets and raised £8,000 for the charity, and after this success the band announced they had plans for gigs and new releases.

The band are now playing shows and recording their 2nd album with new producer Andy Gannon in Manchester, after the Covid pandemic had delayed their plans. It will be released in 2022 on a yet to be named new record label.

In December 2021 founding member Jack Dooley announced he was leaving All the Young.

== Members ==
- Ryan Dooley - singer, songwriter
- Tom Crompton – lead guitar
- Arron Darlington - bass, guitar, vocals
- Mikey Davies - drums, percussion

== Discography ==
=== Studio albums ===
- Welcome Home (Warner Bros. Records UK, 2012) No. 41
- Tales of Grandeur (Scruff of the Neck, 2023) No. 15 UK Independent Album Breakers Chart

=== Live albums ===
- "Live at the Kings Hall, Stoke on Trent" (14th Floor Records, 2012)

=== Singles ===
- "The First Time" (Warner Bros. UK, 2011)
- "Welcome Home" (Warner Bros. UK, 2011)
- "Live from King Tut's" (Warner Bros. UK, 2011)
- "Quiet Night In" (Warner Bros. UK, 2011)
- "The Horizon" (Warner Bros. UK, 2012)
- "You & I" (Warner Bros. UK, 2013)
- "Different Breed" (Midlands Calling UK, 2019)
- "Easily Led" (Midlands Calling UK, 2020)
- "Retirement" (Midlands Calling UK, 2020)
- "Forever" (Scruff of the Neck, 2022)
- "Thugs 'n' Thieves" (Scruff of the Neck, 2022)
- "Smile and Fake It" (Scruff of the Neck, 2022)
- "City of Love" (Scruff of the Neck, 2022)

=== Vinyls ===
- Welcome Home (Midlands Calling, 2011, Record Store Day 2011)
- The Horizon (Midlands Calling, 2012, Record Store Day 2012, Limited to 500 x 7")
- Tales of Grandeur (Scruff of the Neck 2022)

=== Music videos ===
- "The First Time"
- "Welcome Home"
- "Quiet Night In"
- "The Horizon"
- "Another Miracle"
- "Retirement"
- "Forever"
- "Thugs 'n' Thieves"
- "Smile and Fake It"
- "City of Love"
