= Cheer Up, Mother =

1918 song by Mary Earl

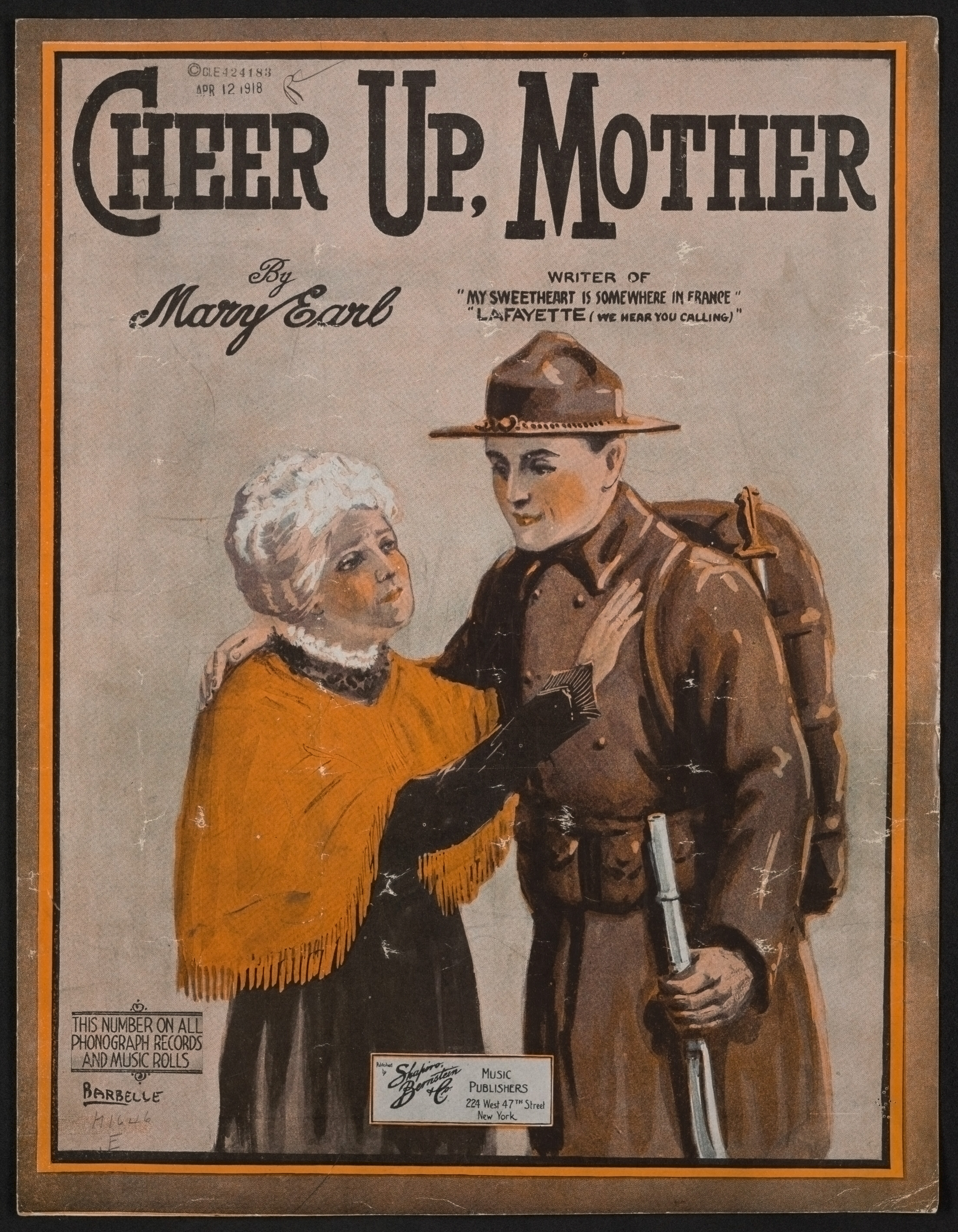

Song
- Released: 1918
- Label: Shapiro, Bernstein & Co.
- Songwriter(s): Mary Earl

"Cheer Up, Mother" is a World War I era song released in 1918. Mary Earl composed the music and wrote the lyrics. Shapiro, Bernstein & Co. of New York, New York published the song. Artist Albert Wilfred Barbelle designed the sheet music cover. It features a mother saying good-bye to her soldier son. It was written for both voice and piano.

In the song, a son is comforting his mother before he heads off to war. The chorus is as follows:

"Cheer up, mother, smile and don't be sighing
Dry the teardrop in your eye;
We'll come back with colors flying
After the war clouds roll by,
Homeward bound then
We'll come sailing, mother.
We will win out, never fear;
Dad came home from fields of glory,
Maybe I'll repeat his story,
So cheer up, mother dear."

The sheet music can be found at Pritzker Military Museum & Library.
