= Robert A. King (composer) =

American composer (1862–1932)

- Born: September 20, 1862
- Died: April 13, 1932 (aged 69)
- Other names: Mary Earl, Betty Chapin, Robert A. Keiser
- Occupations: composer and lyricist
- Years active: 1900-1932
- Notable work: "Lafayette, We Hear You Calling", "Beautiful Ohio"

Robert A. King (September 20, 1862 – April 13, 1932) was a prolific early twentieth century American composer, who wrote under pseudonyms including Mary Earl, Robert A. Keiser, and Betty Chapin.

== Career ==
Some authors believe that King wrote the song "The Fountain in the Park", credited to vaudevillian Ed Haley.

In January 1903, King managed the Teachers' Department for Leo Feist Inc., one of Tin Pan Alley's music publishers.

His first hit was "Anona".’ He collaborated musically with Ballard Macdonald, Billy Moll, Ted Fiorito, Howard Johnson, Gus Kahn, and Charley Straight.

In 1918, King as Mary Earl composed "Beautiful Ohio" with lyrics by Ballard Macdonald. A chart topper during the year of its release, it sold more than five million copies for publisher Shapiro, Bernstein, & Company.

== Selected works ==
- "You're the Only One" (1900)
- "My Moonbeam Babe" (1901)
- "De Sandman's Coming 'Round" (1901)
- "Beyond the Gates of Paradise" (1901)
- "Anona" (1903)
- "The Daisy and the Butterfly" (1902)
- "An Afternoon Tea" (1903)
- "Tell Me, Pretty Maiden" (1903)
- With Robert Recker. "Zenobie: March and Two Step". (1904) OCLC 11185049
- "Romany Waltz"
- "Gee! What a Wonderful Time We'll Have When the Boys Come Home" (1917) OCLC 20119914
- "My Sweetheart is Somewhere in France"
- "Lafayette, We Hear You Calling" (1918)
- "From Valley Forge to France" (1918) OCLC 84533041
- With Ballard MacDonald. "Beautiful Ohio" (1918) Arranged for dance orchestra by Bob Haring in 1936. OCLC 696390859
- "Cheer Up, Mother" (1918)
- "Dreamy Alabama" (1919)
- "Ruspana" (1919)
- "Wild Flower" (1920))
- "In Old Manila" (1920) OCLC 26006985
- "Love Bird" (1921)
- "Isle of Paradise" (1921)
- "I Ain't Nobody's Darling" (1921)
- "Just Like a Rainbow" (1921)
- "By the Old Ohio Shore" (1921)
- "In Rosetime (When We Said Goodbye)" (1922)
- "Honeymoon Chimes" (1922)
- "I've Got the 'Yes, We Have No Bananas' Blues" (1923)
- "Mississippi Ripples" (1923)
- "The Clock is Playing" (1924)
- "Why Did I Kiss that Girl?" (1924)
- With Charley Straight. "I Need Some Pettin'" (1924)
- "Peter Pan (I Love You)" (1925)
- "Seminola" (1925)
- "Keep Your Skirts Down, Mary Ann" (1925)
- "Tell Me You Love Me" (1926)
- With Billy Moll and Howard Johnson. "I Scream, You Scream, We All Scream for Ice Cream" (1927) and (1928) OCLC 43026474
- With Marvin Lee. "Rocky Mountain Lullaby" (1931) OCLC 18861363
- With Morton Downey and Sam M. Lewis. "An Old Fashioned Home in New Hampshire" (1931) OCLC 18852827
