= Anona (song) =

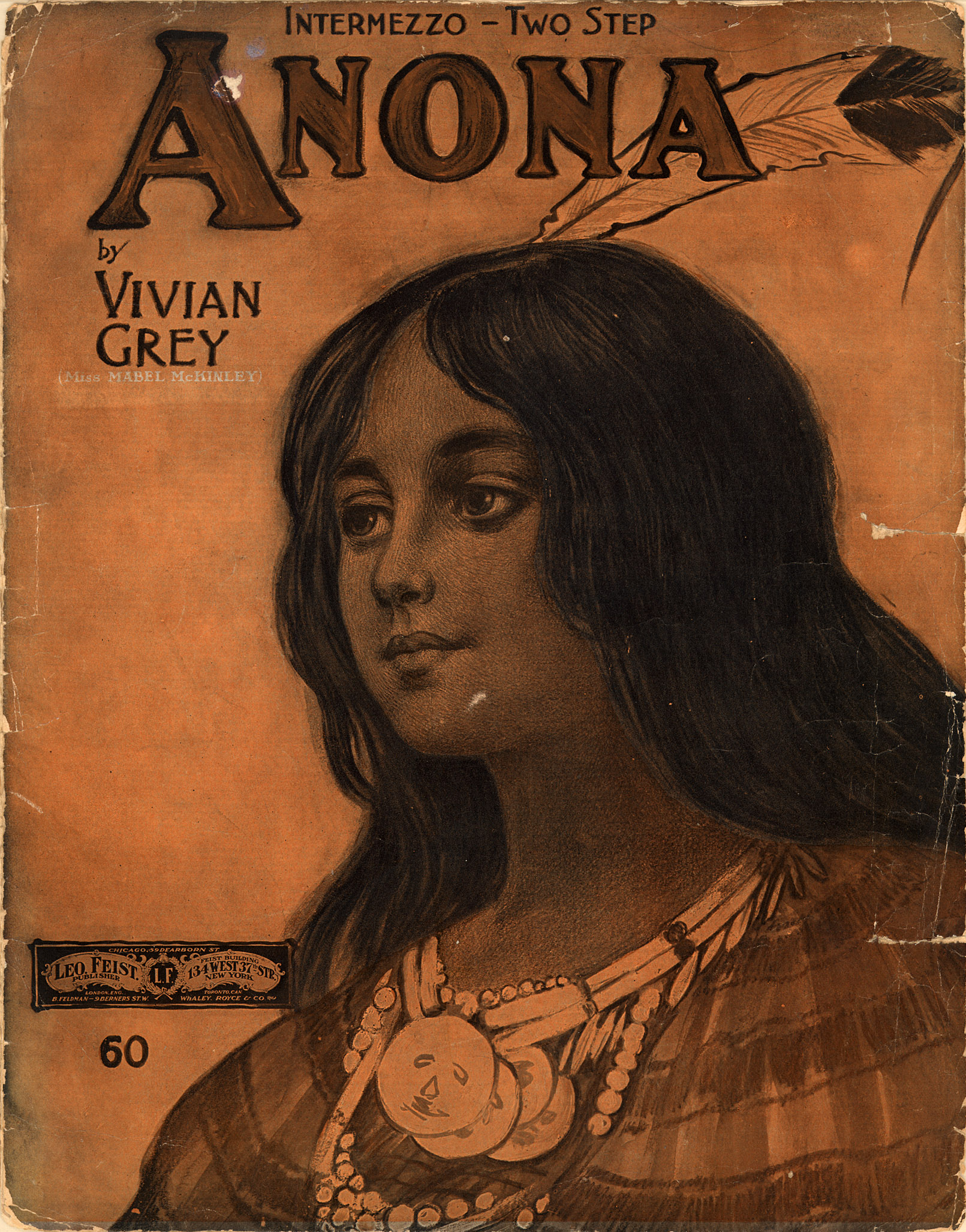
- Sheet music cover (1903)

Song by Vivian Grey
- Released: 1903 by Leo Feist, Inc.
- Songwriter(s): Mabel McKinley

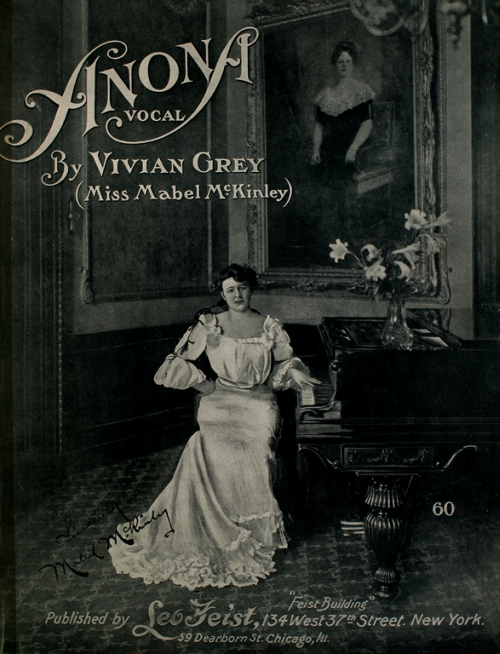
Cover of vocal version with photo of Miss Mabel McKinley.

"Anona" is a popular song supposedly written by Vivian Grey (pseudonym for Mabel McKinley, niece of William McKinley), but in fact composed by Robert Keiser King in 1903, both as an intermezzo and a vocal number. Popular in its day, it was recorded a number of times.

== Lyrics ==
The lyrics as published in the vocal version:

In the western state of Arizona,
Lived an Indian maid;
She was called the beautiful Anona so 'tis said.
Graceful as a fawn was she,
Just as sweet as she could be,
Eyes so bright, dark as night,
Had this pretty little Arizona Indian maiden.
All the chiefs who knew her,
Came to woo her,
For her pined
To marry she declined,
At last she changed her mind,
But 'twas not a chief so grand, who won her heart and hand,
But a warrior bold, who wooed her with a song:

Chorus:
My sweet Anona, in Arizona,
There is no other maid I'd serenade;
By camp-fires gleaming, of you I'm dreaming,
Anona, my sweet Indian maid.

When her father heard that his Anona,
Loved the youthful brave;
Straight-a-way he said he would disown her, things looked grave.
She must marry "heap big chief,"
Sweet Anona hid her grief,
Ran away, so they say,
And got married to the man she loved without delaying.
Then her father sought he,
Never caught her,
Till one day,
When two years passed away,
They both came back to stay,
Then the chief declared a truce, when they named their young papoose,
After him and to his grand-child he would sing:
(Chorus)

== Bibliography ==
- "COMMENTS ON SEPTEMBER RECORDS". Edison Phonograph Monthly. Vol. 1. August 1903. p. 5. "... Vivian Grey (Miss Mabel McKinley, niece of the late President McKinley), the composer of 'Anona'."
- Grey, Vivian. "Anona" (Intermezzo-Two Step) (Sheet music). New York: Leo Feist (1903).
- Grey, Vivian. "Anona" (Vocal) (Sheet music). New York: Leo Feist (1903).
