= Marguerite Dunlap =

American opera singer (1887–1959)

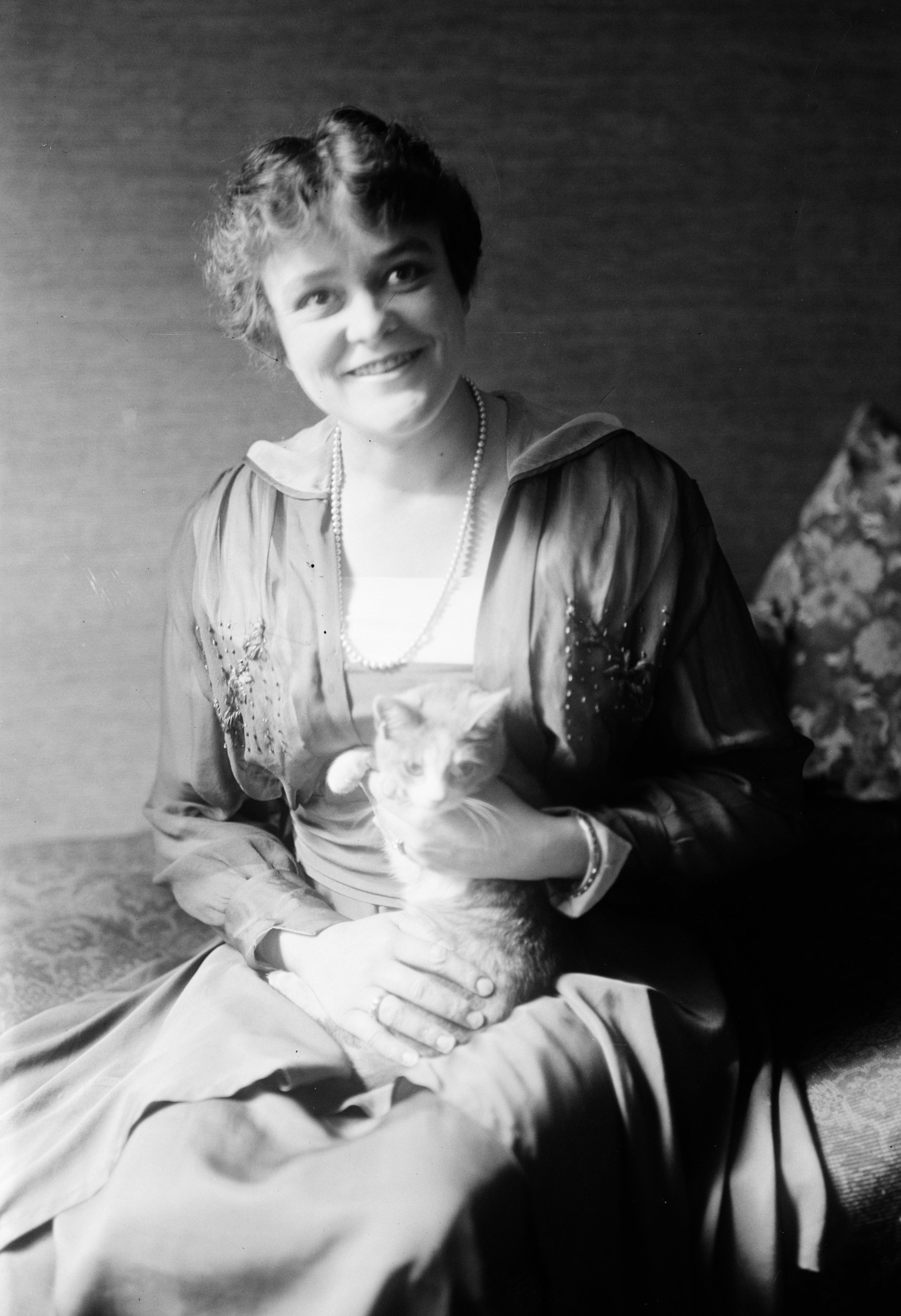
- Born: 20 July 1887; Camden
- Died: 7 January 1959 (aged 71); Upper Montclair
- Resting place: Bloomfield Cemetery
- Occupation: Concert singer
- Employer: Victor Light Opera Company

Marguerite Dunlap (July 20, 1887 – January 7, 1959) was an American contralto opera singer. She is mainly remembered for her recordings from 1904 to 1928 as a core member of the Victor Light Opera Company, the in house singing group for Victor Records. She recorded a wide range of music from operas to Broadway musicals to sacred music, popular music, and songs from the classical concert repertoire.

== Personal life ==
Dunlap was born on July 20, 1887, in Camden, South Carolina to Margaret Cunningham Dunlap and Charles J. Dunlap, a former Confederate Army surgeon. Her family subsequently moved to Atlanta.

She married Joseph E. Garabrant, a marine engineer, and kept singing under her maiden name. She had a daughter, Margaret G. Derr, and a son, Joseph E. Garabrant Jr. She moved to Montclair in 1920, and retired in the 1920s. Her last address was at 217 Montclair Avenue, Upper Montclair. She was a member of St John's Episcopal Church in Montclair and the Upper Montclair Country Club.

After an operation, she was ill for a long time, and she died at her home on January 7, 1959, aged 71. She had three grandchildren at the time of her death. She was buried in Bloomfield Cemetery, after a service at the Van Tassel Funeral Home.

== Career ==
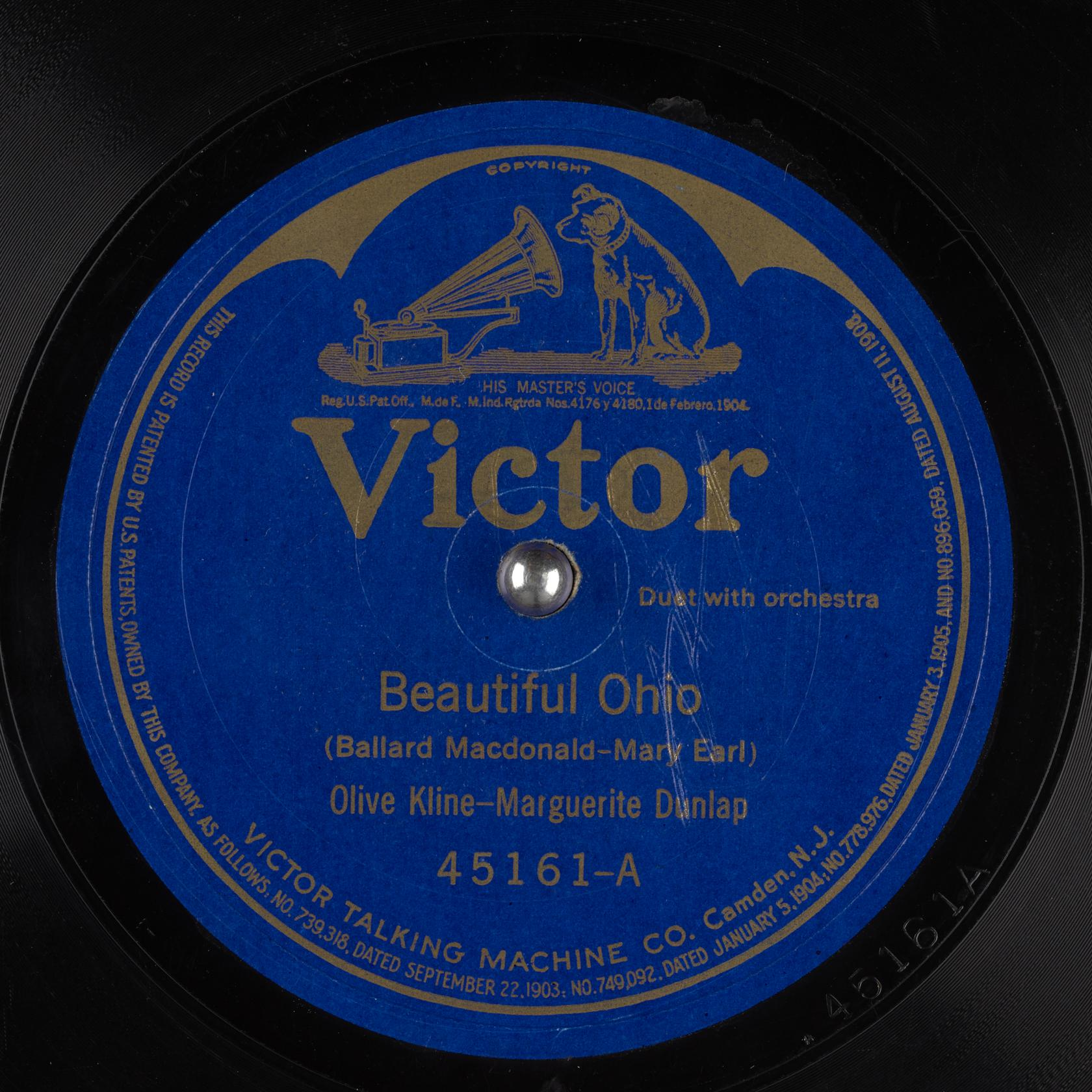
78 rpm phonograph record of "Beautiful Ohio", ballad sung by Dunlap and Olive Kline

Dunlap began to show singing talent early in life, becoming an expert pianist by the age of 16. She sang alto with the First Baptist choir in Atlanta. When she was 18 she went to New York City and in a competitive audition won a scholarship to the Metropolitan Opera school. She studied with Madam Florence Manchester. She made professional recordings as part of the Trinity Choir (at Trinity Church) for Victor Talking Machine Co. She would go on to record 360 records for Victor Records, including being a contralto soloist. In October 1913 she recorded a duet with the Canadian singer (and Victor Records manager) Harry MacDonough of "When It's Apple Blossom Time in Normandy".

Dunlap had her debut at the Metropolitan Opera on January 18, 1907, in the first production of Manon Lescaut, composed by Puccini, with Enrico Caruso as the lead singer; her last portrayal of this role was on March 2, 1907. In 1911, she was one of the performers in the sextet for Lucia di Lammermoor in New York, and also recorded "Mighty Lak' a Rose" ("Mighty Like a Rose") by Ethelbert Nevin in 1911. In 1914, she was involved in a production of "Sextet from Lucia" for a record. She performed in Arkansas in 1915, including songs such as "Mammy Song" by Harriet Ware, and "Mighty Lak' a Rose". She and Olive Kline made one of the early recordings of "Beautiful Ohio" in 1919. This song would become the official state song of Ohio. Dunlap sang in the first radio broadcast of the AM radio station WEAF (later called WNBC) in New York in 1922. Dunlap made recordings up to 1928.
