= Bloomfield Cemetery =

Cemetery in Bloomfield, New Jersey, USA

Coordinates: 40.802°N 74.199°W

Bloomfield Cemetery, designated a New Jersey Historic Site, is located at 383 Belleville Avenue, Bloomfield in Essex County, New Jersey.

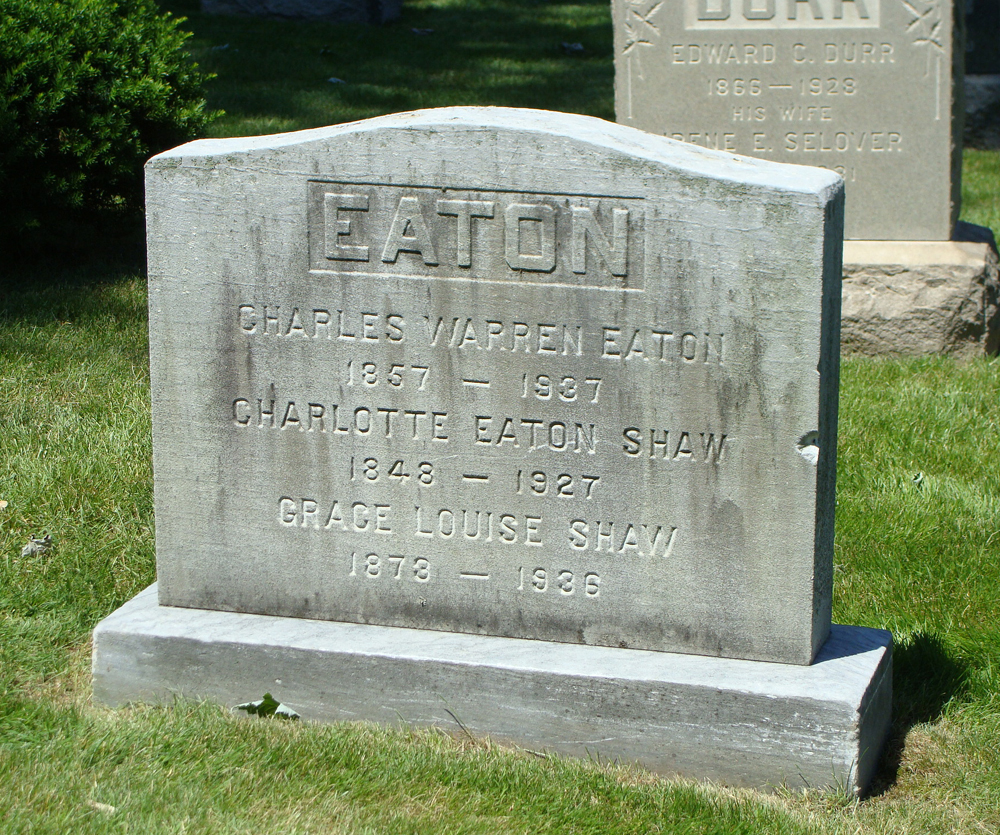
Charles Warren Eaton gravestone in Bloomfield Cemetery

Bloomfield Cemetery is one of New Jersey’s most significant rural cemeteries, and the only such landscape to be designed by Alexander Jackson Davis, one of America’s most important Victorian architects. Like nearby Mount Pleasant Cemetery (in Newark), it contains the graves of numerous individuals, families and social groups that were important to the history of Essex County and New Jersey as a whole. Parts of the landscape are recognizable as examples of picturesque cemetery design, and many 19th century markers evince characteristics of funerary art common during the Rural Cemetery Movement (c. 1840–1880).

== Noteworthy interments ==
The Presbyterian Church burial ground in Bloomfield was a resting place for many veterans of the Revolutionary war, as might be expected for an Essex County town that had a significant 18th century population. Many names belong to the prominent families that helped to found Bloomfield, including members of the Dodd, Davis, Baldwin and Ward clans. Officers interred in the “Old Ground” included Captain Isaac Harrison (1757–1823) in Lots 22 and 23, Captain Jesse Baldwin (1754–1805) in Lot 51, Captain William Crane (1757–1832) in Lot 112, and Captain John Collins (1754–1806) in Lot 64. Others among the 32 marked burials were generally enlisted men. Moreover, the cemetery also has a large number of Civil War veterans from the town, many marked with elaborate symbols of valor and patriotism.

More importantly, Bloomfield Cemetery contains the remains of a large number of political, cultural and civic leaders who contributed to the growth of the nation over a period of three centuries. These include

- Hank Borowy (1916–2004), Major League Baseball All-Star pitcher who played for the New York Yankees, Chicago Cubs, Philadelphia Phillies, Pittsburgh Pirates and Detroit Tigers.
- Randolph Bourne (1886–1918), a journalist and critic
- William Batchelder Bradbury (1816–1868), composer of numerous hymns, including Just As I Am and Jesus Loves Me.
- Thomas Cadmus (1736–1821), businessman, Revolutionary War officer and community leader.
- A. J. Davis (1803–1892), architect.
- Marguerite Dunlap (1887–1959), opera singer
- Charles Warren Eaton (1857–1937), artist
- Franklin W. Fort (1880–1937), represented New Jersey's 9th congressional district from 1925 to 1931.
- John Franklin Fort (1852–1920), Republican Governor of New Jersey from 1908 to 1911.
- Charles Griffes (1884–1920), composer.
- James N. Jarvie (1853–1929), businessman and philanthropist
- Roy Franklin Nichols (1896–1973), academic
