= Bay of Biscay =

Gulf of the northeast Atlantic Ocean located south of the Celtic Sea

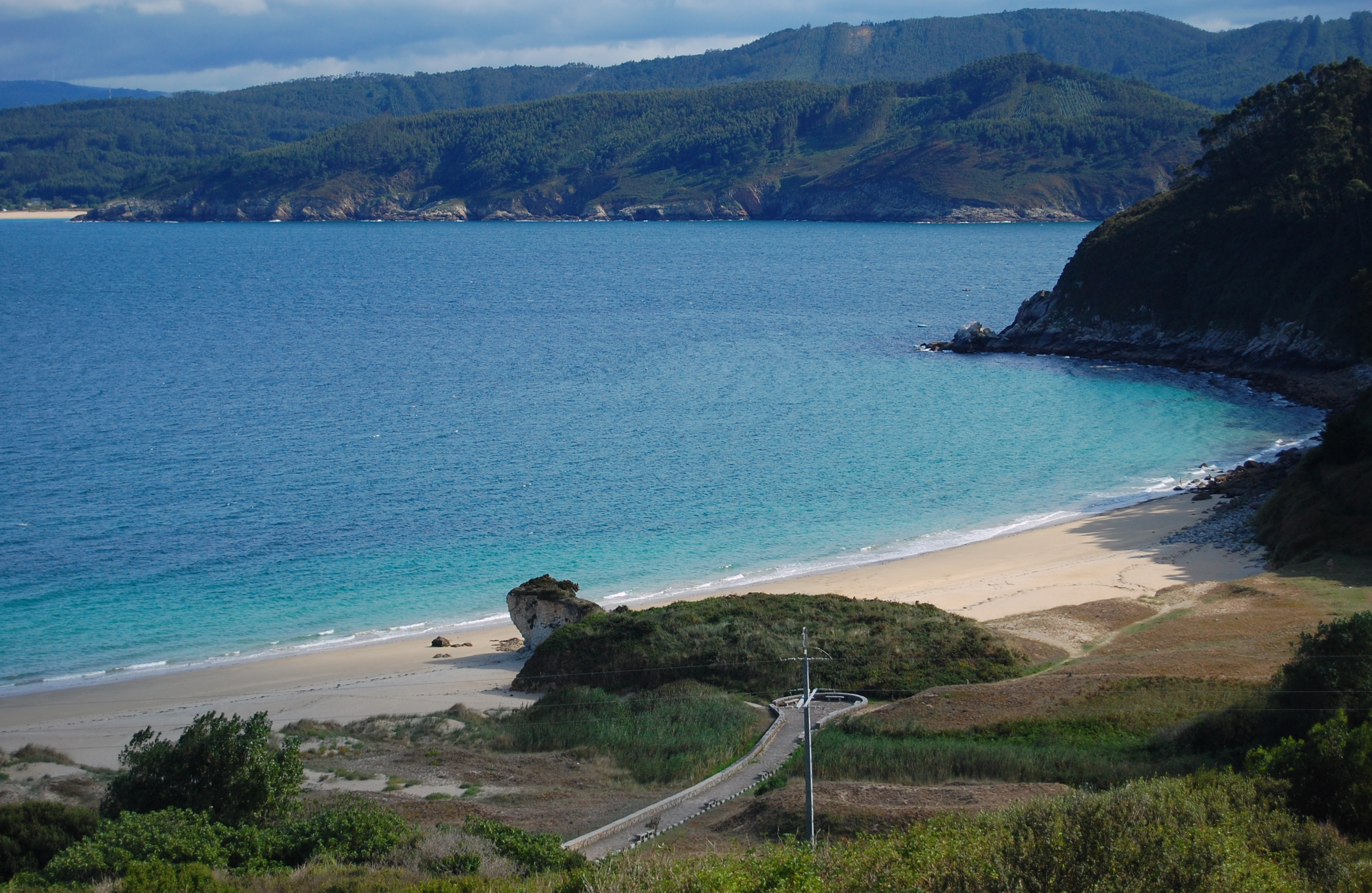
- Spanish coastline

- Map of the Bay of Biscay

- Bathymetric map of the Bay of Biscay
- Location: Western Europe and Southern Europe
- Coordinates: 45°30′N 04°24′W
- Type: Gulf
- Ocean/sea sources: Atlantic Ocean
- Basin countries: France and Spain
- Max. length: 593.7 km (368.9 mi)
- Max. width: 511.1 km (317.6 mi)
- Surface area: 223,000 km^{2} (86,000 sq mi)
- Average depth: 1,744 m (5,722 ft)
- Max. depth: 4,735 m (15,535 ft)
- Water volume: 389,000 km^{3} (93,000 cu mi)
- Salinity: 35 g/L

The Bay of Biscay, (/ˈbɪskeɪ, -ki/ BISS-kay, -kee) also known as the Gulf of Biscay or the Gulf of Gascony, is a gulf of the northeast Atlantic Ocean located south of the Celtic Sea. It lies along the northern coast of Spain, extending westward from the French border to Cape Ortegal, and along the western coast of France from Point Penmarc'h southward to the Spanish border.

The average depth is 1,744 m (5,722 ft) and the greatest depth is 4,735 m (15,535 ft).

== Etymology ==
The Bay of Biscay is known in Spain as the Gulf of Biscay (Basque: Bizkaiko Golkoa; Galician: Golfo de Biscaia; Spanish: Golfo de Vizcaya). In France, it is called the Gulf of Gascony (French: Golfe de Gascogne [ɡɔl.f(ə) də ɡas.kɔɲ]; Occitan: Golf de Gasconha; Breton: Pleg-mor Gwaskogn; Basque: Gaskoiniako Golkoa). In Latin, the bay was known as Sinus Cantabrorum (Cantabrian Gulf); the name Cantabrian Sea is still used locally for the southern area of the Bay of Biscay that washes over the northern coast of Spain (Cantabria). The English name comes from Biscay on the northern Spanish coast, probably standing for the western Basque districts (Biscay up to the early 19th century).

== Geography ==
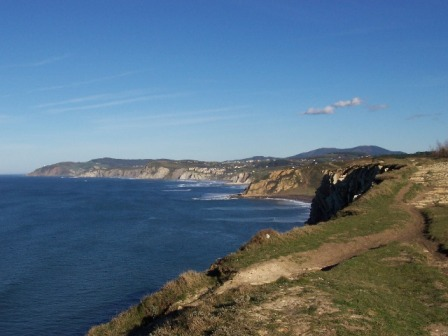
Cliffs in Biscay along the Bay of Biscay

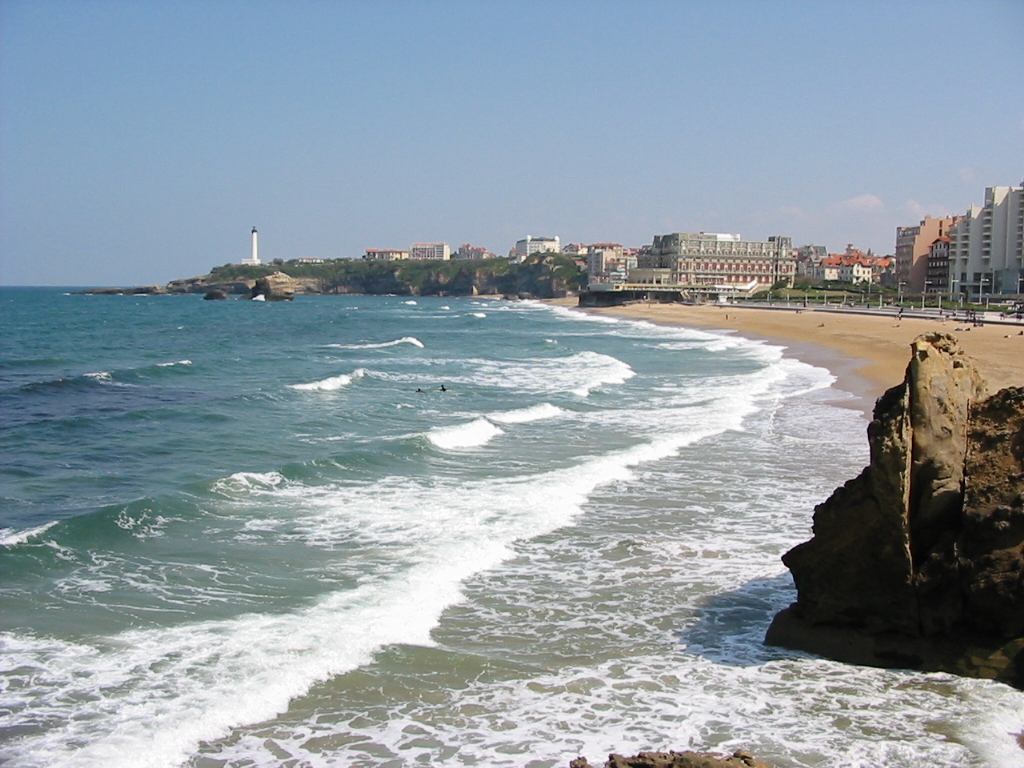
Biarritz Beach (French Basque Country)

Parts of the continental shelf extend far into the bay, resulting in fairly shallow waters in many areas and thus the rough seas for which the region is known. Heavy storms occur in the bay, especially during the winter months. The Bay of Biscay is home to some of the Atlantic Ocean's fiercest weather; abnormally high waves occur there. Up until recent years it was a regular occurrence for merchant vessels to founder in Biscay storms.

=== Extent ===
The International Hydrographic Organization defines the limits of the Bay of Biscay as "a line joining Cap Ortegal (43°46′N 7°52′W) to Penmarch Point (47°48′N 4°22′W)".

The southernmost portion is the Cantabrian Sea.

=== Rivers ===
The main rivers that empty into the Bay of Biscay are Odet, Aven, Laïta, Scorff, Blavet, Vilaine, Loire, Lay, Sèvre Niortaise, Charente, Seudre, Garonne, Dordogne, Eyre, Adour, Nivelle, Untxin, Bidasoa, Oiartzun, Urumea, Oria, Urola, Deba, Artibai, Lea, Oka, Nervión, Agüera, Asón, Miera, Pas, Saja, Nansa, Deva, Sella, Nalón, Navia, Esva, Eo, Landro and Sor.

=== Climate ===
In late spring and early summer, a large fog triangle fills the southwestern half of the bay, extending a few kilometres inland.

As winter begins, weather becomes severe. Depressions frequently enter from the west, and either move north to the British Isles or enter the Ebro Valley, dry out, and are finally reborn in the form of powerful thunderstorms as they reach the Mediterranean Sea. These depressions cause severe weather at sea and bring light but constant rain to its shores (known as orballo, sirimiri, morrina, orbayu, orpin or calabobos). Powerful windstorms may form if the pressure falls rapidly (galerna), traveling along the Gulf Stream at great speed, resembling a hurricane, and finally reaching the bay with their maximum power, such as Cyclone Klaus.

The Gulf Stream enters the bay following the continental shelf's border anti-clockwise (the Rennell Current), keeping temperatures moderate all year long.

=== Main cities ===
The main cities on the shores (or close to) of the Bay of Biscay are Lorient, Vannes, Saint-Nazaire, Bordeaux, Bayonne, Biarritz, Nantes, La Rochelle, San Sebastián, Bilbao, Santander, Gijón and Avilés.

== History ==
The southern end of the gulf is also called "Mar Cantábrico" in Spanish (Cantabrian Sea), from the Estaca de Bares, as far as the mouth of Adour river, but this name is not generally used in English. It was named by Romans in the 1st century BC as Sinus Cantabrorum (Bay of the Cantabri) and also, Mare Gallaecum (the Sea of the Galicians). On some medieval maps, the Bay of Biscay is marked as El Mar del los Vascos (the Basque Sea).

The Bay of Biscay has been the site of many famous naval engagements over the centuries. In 1592 the Spanish defeated an English fleet during the Battle of the Bay of Biscay. The Biscay campaign of June 1795 consisted of a series of manoeuvres and two battles fought between the British Channel Fleet and the French Atlantic Fleet off the southern coast of Brittany during the second year of the French Revolutionary Wars. The USS Californian sank here after striking a naval mine on 22 June 1918. In 1920 the SS Afrique sank after losing power and drifting into a reef in a storm with the loss of 575 lives. On 28 December 1943, the Battle of the Bay of Biscay was fought between HMS Glasgow and HMS Enterprise, and a group of German destroyers as part of Operation Stonewall during World War II. The area became known as the "Valley of Death" by U-boat crews following a series of repeated losses from RAF attacks on U-boats from 1943 until the end of the war. The U-667 sank on 25 August 1944 in position 46°00′N 01°30′W, when she struck a mine. All hands were lost.

On 12 April 1970, Soviet submarine K-8 sank in the Bay of Biscay due to a fire that crippled the submarine's nuclear reactors. An attempt to save the sub failed, resulting in the death of forty sailors and the loss of four nuclear torpedoes. Due to the great depth (15,000 ft or 4,600 m), no salvage operation was attempted.

== Wildlife ==
=== Plaiaundi Ecological Park ===
The Plaiaundi Ecological Park is a 24-hectare coastal wetland lying where the Bidasoa River meets the sea in the Bay of Biscay. Plaiaundi consists of a wide variety of flora (visitors view them mainly in the spring) and fauna (visitors with binoculars arrive all during the year, because of the birds' migratory habits). This nature park contains a variety of birds, reptiles, mammals and insects.

=== Marine mammals ===
The car ferries from Gijón to Nantes/Saint-Nazaire, Portsmouth to Bilbao and from Plymouth, Portsmouth and Poole to Santander provide one of the most convenient ways to see cetaceans in European waters. Often specialist groups take the ferries to collect more information. Volunteers and employees of ORCA regularly observe and monitor cetacean activity from the bridge of the ships on Brittany Ferries' Portsmouth to Santander route. Many species of whales and dolphins can be seen in this area. Most importantly, it is one of the few places in the world where the beaked whales, such as the Cuvier's beaked whale, have been observed relatively frequently. Biscay Dolphin Research monitored cetacean activity from the P&O Ferries cruise ferry Pride of Bilbao, on voyages from Portsmouth to Bilbao.

North Atlantic right whales, one of the most endangered species of whales, once came to the bay for feeding and probably for calving as well, but whaling activities by Basque people almost wiped them out sometime prior to the 1850s. The eastern population of this species are considered to be almost extinct, and there has been no record of right whales in the Bay of Biscay except for a pair in 1977 (possibly a mother and calf) at 43°00′N 10°30′W, and another pair in June 1980. Other records in the late 20th century include one off Galicia at 43°00′N 10°30′W in September 1977 reported by a whaling company and another one seen off the Iberian Peninsula.

The best areas to see the larger cetaceans are in the deep waters beyond the continental shelf, particularly over the Santander Canyon and Torrelavega Canyon in the south of the Bay.

The alga Colpomenia peregrina was introduced and first noticed in 1906 by oyster fishermen in the Bay of Biscay.

Grammatostomias flagellibarba (scaleless dragonfish) are native to these waters.

== See also ==
- Asturias
- Basque Country (greater region)
- Cantabria
- On the Bay of Biscay
