= My Sweetheart Is Somewhere in France =

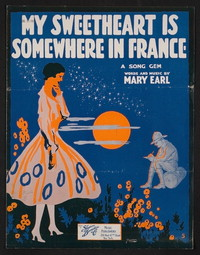
- Sheet music cover

Song
- Released: 1917
- Songwriter(s): Mary Earl

"My Sweetheart Is Somewhere in France" is a World War I era song first released in 1917. Mary Earl composed the music and wrote the lyrics. Shapiro, Bernstein & Co. Inc. of New York City published the song. Elizabeth Spencer performed a version of the song that was released by the Victor record label.

It was written for voice and piano. On the cover is a woman looking down at a soldier writing a letter. Between them are the moon and stars.

The song is told from the point of view of a person whose significant other is in France, fighting the war. The chorus is as follows:

My sweetheart is far across the ocean
My sweetheart is somewhere in France
When he whispered "Good-Bye"
I tried not to cry
Because he said,
"I'm taking a soldier's chance"
Could I see him, I'd tell him that I love him
And I'd put all my heart in one fond glance
Ev'ry night I say a pray'r
For the boy who's over there
My sweetheart is somewhere in France

The sheet music can be found at Pritzker Military Museum & Library.
