= Beautiful Ohio =

Regional anthem of the US state of Ohio

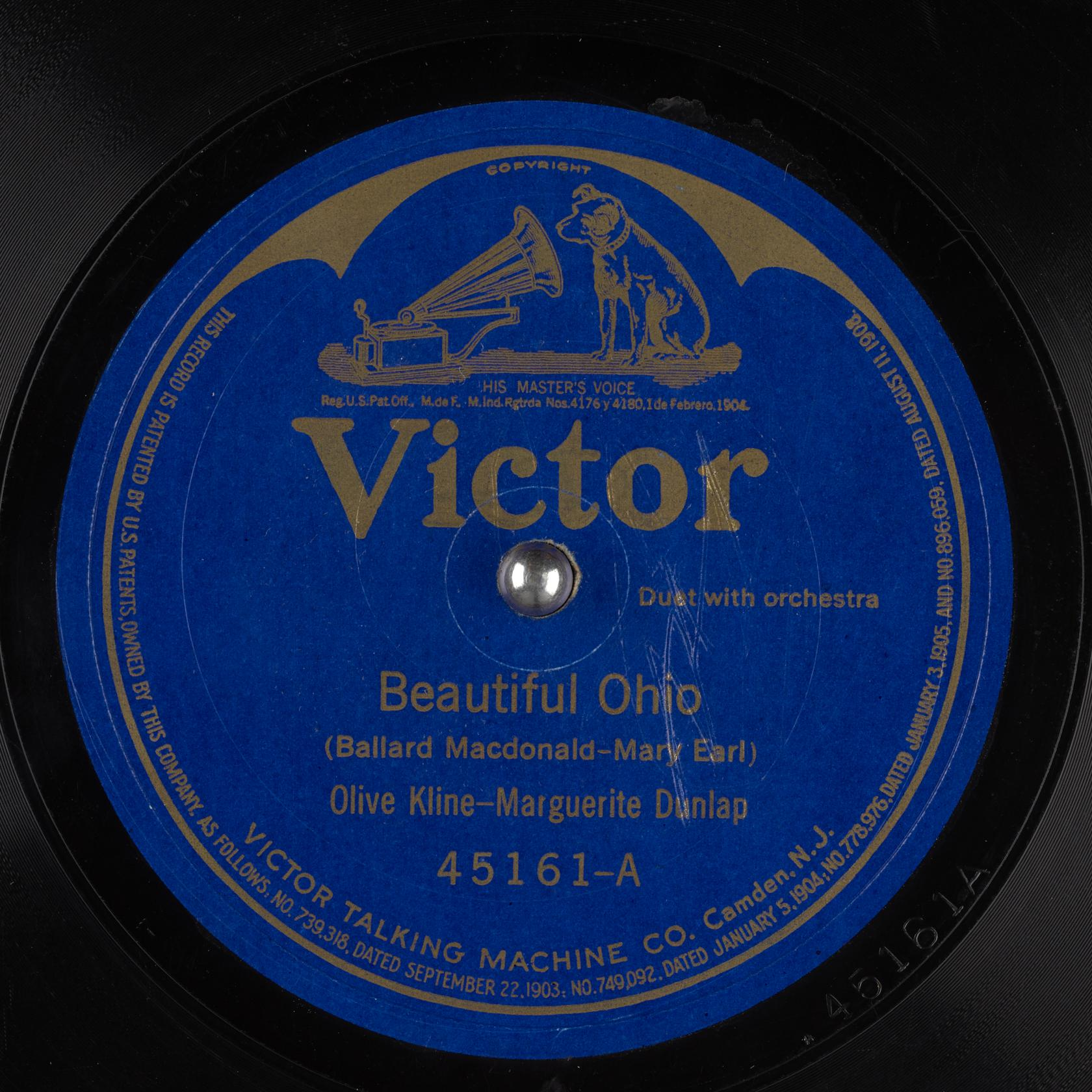
- 78 record of "Beautiful Ohio", a ballad sung by Olive Kline and Marguerite Dunlap
- Regional anthem of Ohio
- Lyrics: Wilbert McBride, 1989
- Music: Robert A. King, 1918
- Published: 1918
- Adopted: 1969
- Readopted: 1989

Audio sample
- "Beautiful Ohio", sung by Ruth Lenox (Pseudonym for Marie Morrisey) and Henry Burr, published c. January 1919.: file; help

"Beautiful Ohio" is the regional anthem of the U.S. state of Ohio, adopted in 1969 as the official state song.

== History ==
The first lyrics were written in 1918 by Ballard MacDonald and the music by Robert A. "Bobo" King, who used the pseudonym Mary Earl. The melody is partly based on "Song of India" by Rimsky-Korsakov and "Beautiful Dreamer" by Stephen Foster. The original 1918 publication also featured a second obbligato voice, using the tune "Love's Old Sweet Song".

A bill passed by the Ohio General Assembly in 1969 made it the state's official song, and in 1989 adopted an amendment to section 5.09 of the Ohio Revised Code which changed the original words to a new set, written by Wilbert McBride.

"Beautiful Ohio" was originally written as a love song by Ballard MacDonald whose lyrics depict a "paradise of love divine." When McBride rewrote the lyrics for the 1989 version, he gave a much more accurate portrayal of Ohio by including things such as the state's cities and factories rather than two imaginary lovers.

== Recordings ==
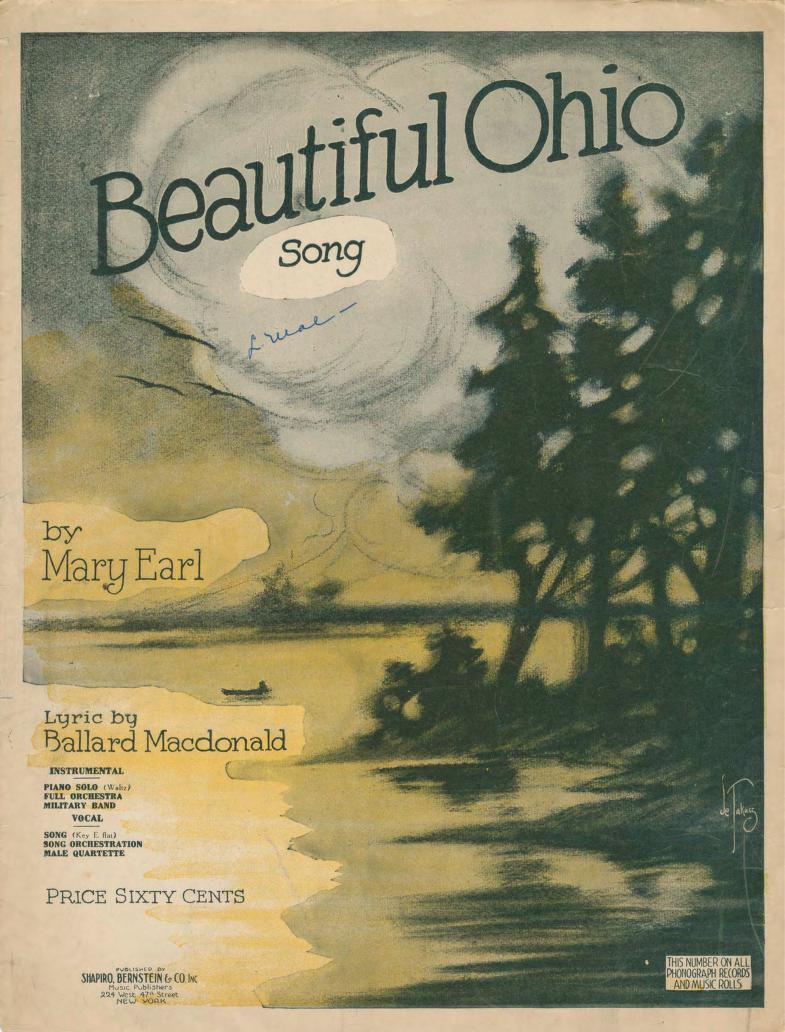
Sheet music cover, 1918

Popular versions in 1919 were by:

- Henry Burr
- Waldorf-Astoria Dance Orchestra
- Prince's Orchestra
- Olive Kline & Marguerite Dunlap
- Fritz Kreisler
- Sam Ash

== Later recordings ==
- Jo Stafford included the song on her 1966 album Do I Hear a Waltz?

== Modern use ==
Though "Beautiful Ohio" was originally written as a waltz, one version of the song is a march, arranged by Richard Heine. It is commonly performed by the Ohio State University Marching Band when traveling, including their appearance in the 2005 Inaugural Parade of President George W. Bush and at the 2009 Inauguration of President Barack Obama.

The original waltz version of the song is performed by the All Ohio State Fair Band (which holds shows multiple times a day during the Ohio State Fair) at the beginning of every performance.

The original waltz version of the song has been played at the end of cavern tours at Ohio Caverns in West Liberty, Ohio, since 1928.

== Original lyrics ==
Long, long ago
Someone I know
Had a little red canoe,
In it room for only two.
Love found its start
Then in my heart,
And like a flower grew.

Chorus:

Drifting with the current down a moonlit stream,
While above the Heavens in their glory gleam,
And the stars on high
Twinkle in the sky,
Seeming in a paradise of love divine,
Dreaming of a pair of eyes that looked in mine.
Beautiful Ohio, in dreams again I see
Visions of what used to be.

== 1989 lyrics ==
I sailed away;
Wandered afar;
Crossed the mighty restless sea;
Looked for where I ought to be.
Cities so grand, mountains above,
Led to this land I love.

Chorus:

Beautiful Ohio, where the golden grain
Dwarf the lovely flowers in the summer rain.
Cities rising high, silhouette the sky.
Freedom is supreme in this majestic land;
Mighty factories seem to hum a tune, so grand.
Beautiful Ohio, thy wonders are in view,
Land where my dreams all come true!

== See also ==
- "Hang On Sloopy", official state rock song of Ohio
