= Galerna =

Sudden violent storm in the Bay of Biscay

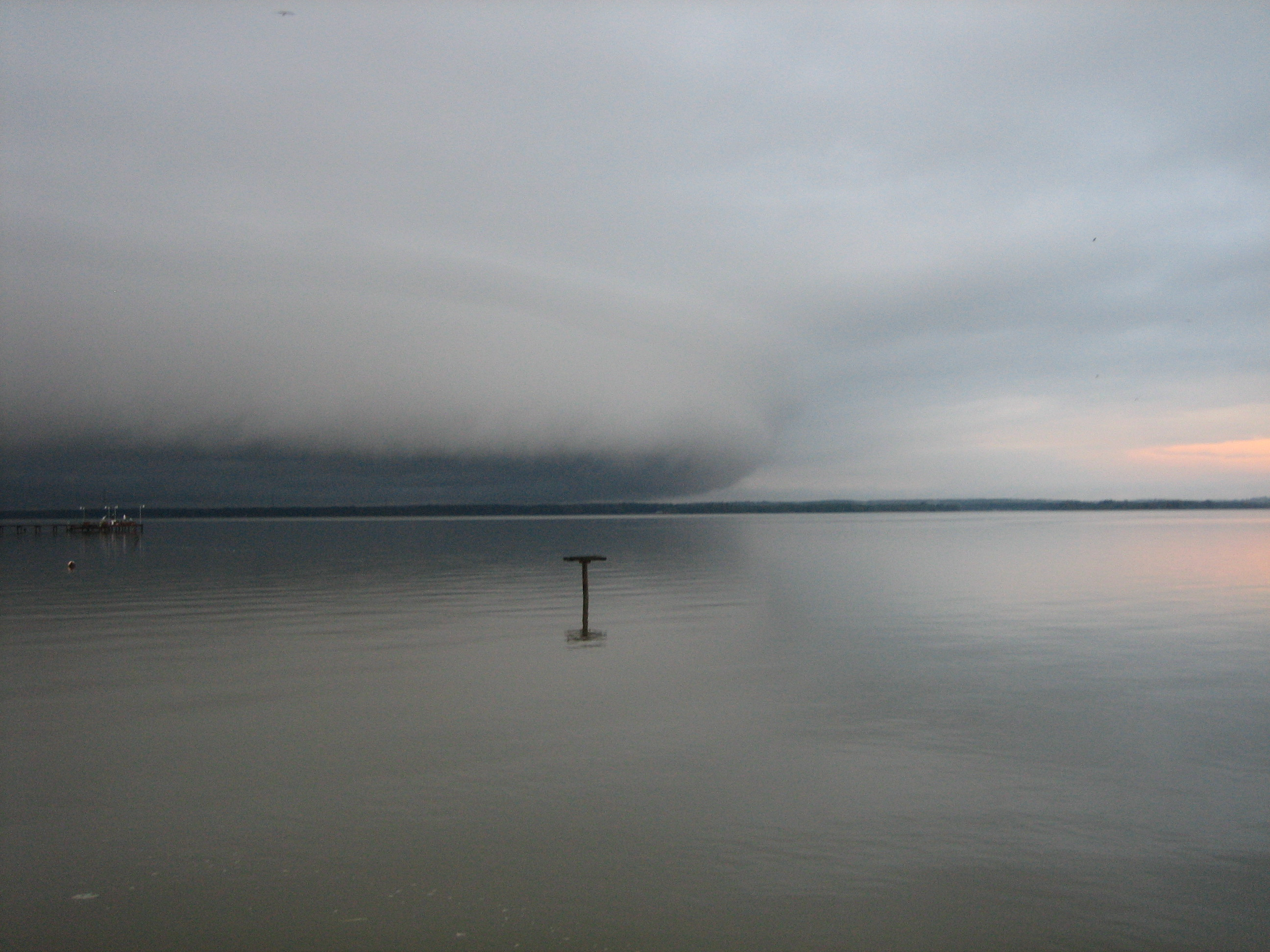
Sudden advance of a cold front, a similar situation to the one triggering a galerna.

A galerna (Basque: enbata) is a sudden and violent storm with strong wind gusts from the west or northwest that affects coastal areas of the Cantabrian Sea and the Bay of Biscay, predominantly from spring to fall. It especially affects the central and eastern part of the Spanish north coast provinces (Asturias, Cantabria, Biscay and Gipuzkoa) and the southwestern region of France (French Basque Country, Quercy, Touraine, Berry, Deux-Sèvres, Vendée, and Brittany). The name comes from French galerne and that originates from Breton (gwalarn), a wind from the northwest.

== Description ==
They usually occur during warm and calm days when a cold front causes a sudden change in wind direction and intensity that can exceed 100 km/h. The sky darkens and there is a sudden decrease in temperature of up to 12 °C in 20 minutes, rapid increase in atmospheric pressure, and a rise in relative humidity. The resulting wave heights in the coastal ocean range from rough to very high on the Douglas Sea scale. Precipitation is not usually associated with galernas, although it can occur occasionally.

It is included within the so-called coastally-trapped disturbances (CTD). Most of the galernas have a local origin inside the Bay of Biscay, and only a few ones are directly caused by oceanic fronts initiated out of the region. The local frontogenesis is more frequently initiated by the relatively cold marine southwesterly pre-frontals preceding a parent oceanic front and blowing against the warm continentals inside the Bay of Biscay. The stably stratified marine boundary layer behind this new galerna front may become trapped in the coastal strip against the Cantabrian Mountains and ducted along the coast under synoptic and/or locally driven pressure gradients.

Wind vectors and fronts on 03 July 2015 during the development of a galerna in the Bay of Biscay. The fronts are depicted by an automatic front identification scheme: blue and red shaded colors in ms^{−1} represent SW-to-NW and E-to-W wind shifts, respectively. The galerna reached their maximum intensity between 18:00 and 20:00 UTC on the Basque Coast. Blue contours represent 1000 hPa-wind convergence above a reference value (3·10^{5} s^{−1})

If this is the case, the front is enhanced by favorable west-east coastal pressure gradients developed after lee troughing caused by the intense Foehn at the coast, ahead of the galerna front. The observed lee trough has both a thermal (adiabatic warming) and dynamic origin (horizontal convergence associated with the increase of relative vorticity and vertical stretching of air columns passing over the ridge and descending the lee slope). The local front enhancement appears to be the reason for the apparent jump of the primary front, which may eventually weaken, and even disappear, as the galerna front sharpens, as observed on 3 July 2015 with the hourly winds of the ERA5 reanalysis of the European Centre for Medium-Range Weather Forecasting (ECMWF). In this case, as in many others, this front is not accompanied by appreciable cloudiness, with sufficient thickness and/or breadth, and consequently it remains hidden in the images of meteorological satellites.

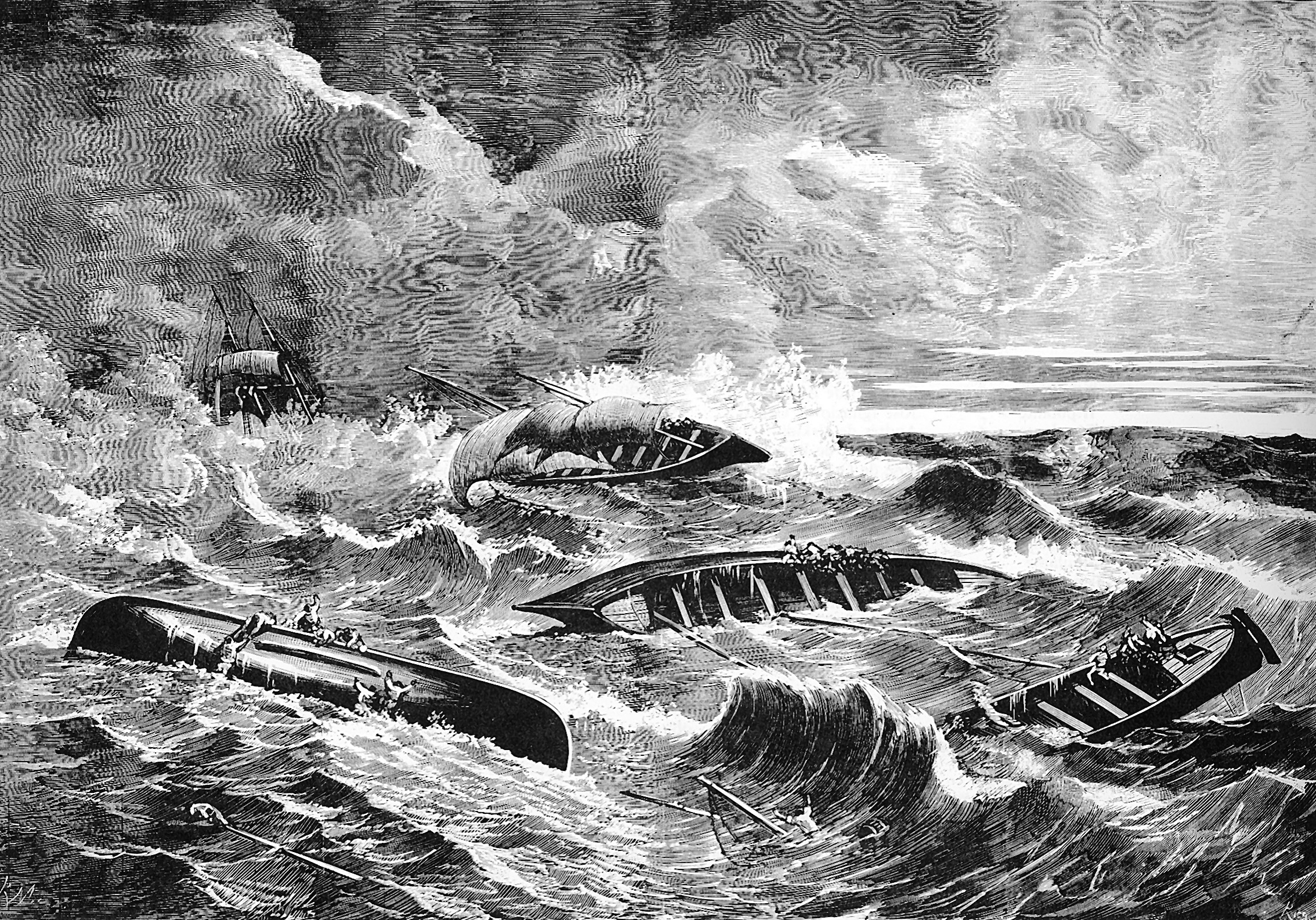
Painting of a galerna affecting Bermeo.

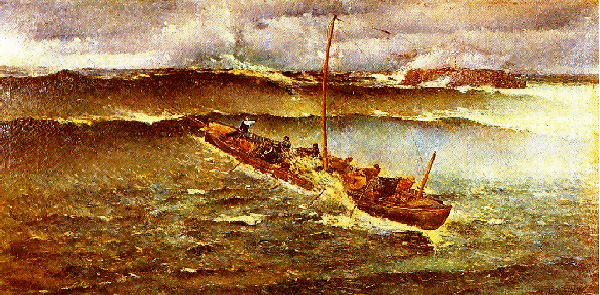
¡Jesús y adentro!, painting from the end of the 19th century by Fernando Pérez del Camino. ¡Jesús y adentro!, "Jesus Christ and onward!" was the prayer used by fishermen from Santander during storm conditions such as galernas.

The area receives an average of four to five relatively intense galernas (Vmax > 50 km/h) per year: their number shows a great interannual variability and a marked seasonality with a maximum in May and June and a winter minimum. They occur more frequently between noon and the late afternoon, where the most intense wind records concentrate. Because galernas cause a sudden and abrupt change in weather and sea conditions, they are some of the meteorological events most feared by mariners and fishermen in the Bay of Biscay, especially historically. Currently, weather forecast models are able to predict the precursor conditions to galernas, reducing their potential risks, but predicting the exact timing of their occurrence remains a challenge.

== Galernas throughout history ==
Galernas have caused many fatalities throughout history. One of the most damaging events occurred on April 20, 1878 and it was known as the "Galerna of Easter Saturday". It is featured in the novel Sotileza by José María de Pereda. During that day, fishermen tried to reach the coast in their launch boats to no avail, while their families watched from shore. 322 fishermen died along the Cantabrian coast (132 from Cantabria and 190 from the Basque Country), causing a great commotion. The response to this disaster caused the introduction of several maritime safety improvements (e.g., flush deck, weather reports, search and rescue operations). Even with these improvements, many galernas continued causing fatalities.

Date	Deaths	Notes
1842		It affected mostly Laredo.
1873		Almost 50 boats lost along the coast all the way to Bayonne.
April 20, 1878	322	Known as the Easter Saturday Galerna.
1879		Over two dozen fishing boats sunk.
1882		Several boats lost in Santander.
April 26, 1890	54	Four boats sunk in Santander: Santa Catalina, San Pedro, Nuestra Señora del Carmen y Buenas Noches.
1899		The boat Josefita sunk in Santoña and the fishermen were saved by the yacht Goizeko Izarra, owned by Ramon de la Sota.
July 12, 1908	49	Several boats disappeared along the coast of Asturias, Cantabria and Biscay: Carmen Margarita, Josefa; Jesús, María y José; San Ignacio; San Jerónimo; Concepción; Antigua; Santa Bárbara and Salomé.
August 12 – 13, 1912	141	119 fishermen died in Bermeo: one in every 10 fishermen from the town died.
December 20, 1914		Four boats sunk in Suances and Comillas: Encarnación, Santa Cecilia, María and Landasun.
July 12 – 13, 1961	83	The fishing fleet of skipjack tuna was caught far from shore by the galerna.
June 7, 1987	8	Frontal galerna that affected Asturias, Cantabria, the Basque Country and the southwest coast of France. Wind gusts of 140 km/h were measured in Gijón.

== See also ==
- List of local winds
