= Olive Kline =

American opera singer

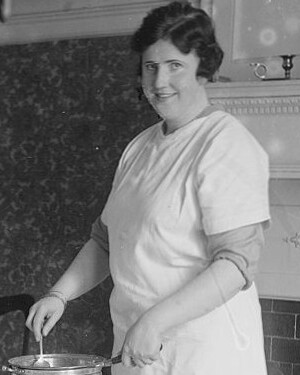
- Kline in 1917
- Born: July 7, 1887; Amsterdam, New York
- Died: July 9, 1976 (aged 89); Pelham, New York
- Other names: Olive Kline Hulihan; Alice Green
- Spouse: Dr. John Walter Hulihan (1884-1957) (m. 1919; died 1957)

Olive Kline (sometimes given as Olive Kline Hulihan or the pseudonym Alice Green; July 7, 1887 – July 29, 1976) was an American soprano who is chiefly remembered for her recordings for Victor Records from 1912 to 1935. She recorded a wide range of music from operas and Broadways musicals to sacred music, popular music, and songs from the classical concert repertoire.

== Biography ==
Kline was born on July 7, 1887, in Amsterdam, New York, to Martha D. and Oliver S. Kline. Her family moved to Schenectady, New York, around 1897, when her father went to work at General Electric.

She attended Saint Agnes Girls' School in Albany, New York. Her first vocal teachers were Herbert Wilbur Green whose surname she borrowed for her occasional recording pseudonym Alice Green. She later studied singing with Herbert Witherspoon.

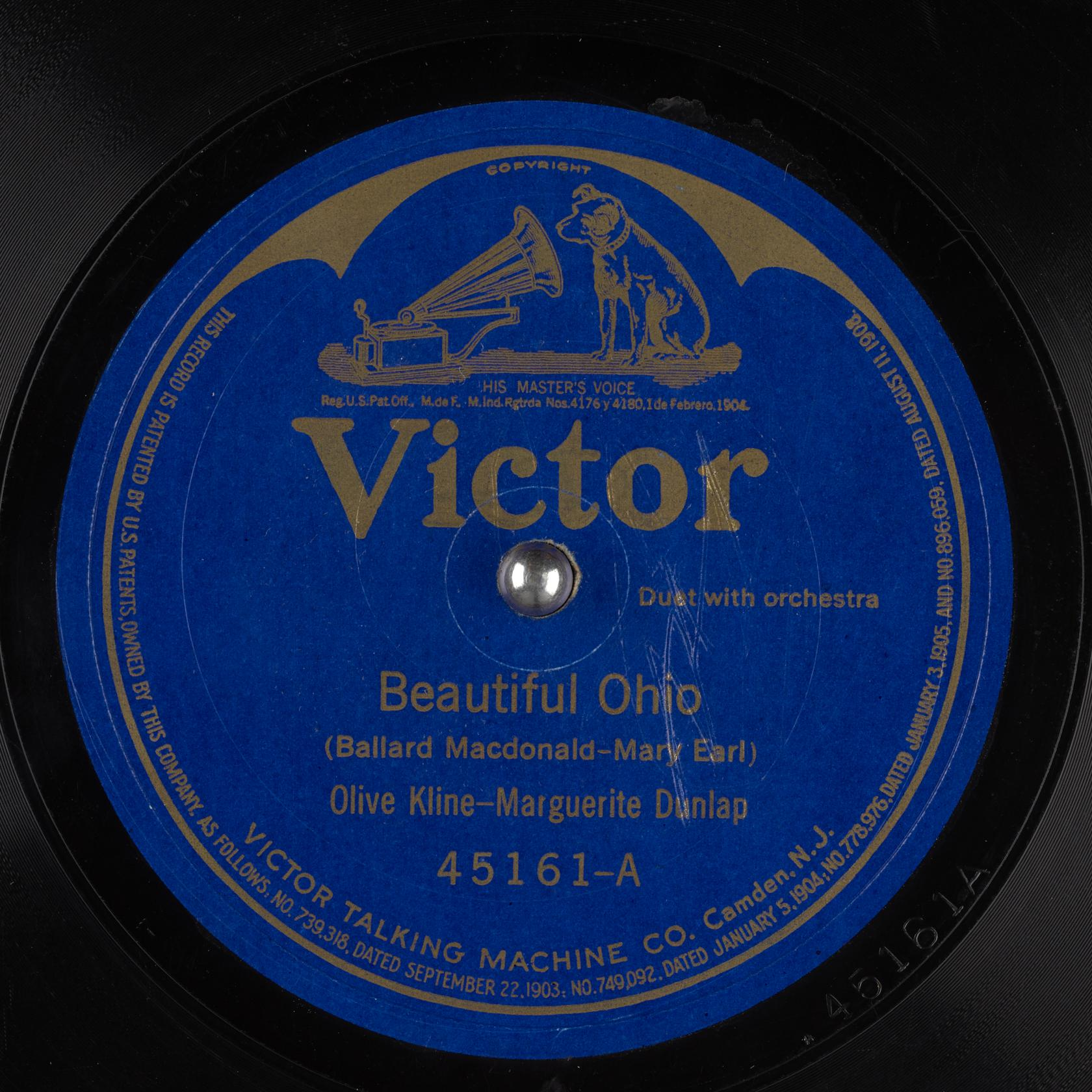
78 record of the Beautiful Ohio ballad sung by Kline and Marguerite Dunlap

Kline performing "The Japanese Sandman" in 1920, with Josef Pasternack conducting.

Kline began her career as a paid soloist with several churches in New York City, including the Madison Avenue Reformed Church (now Central Presbyterian Church), Plymouth Church of the Pilgrims, and the Collegiate Reformed Protestant Dutch Church. She recorded for Victor Records starting in 1912. In 1914 she made her professional concert debut in Detroit in a program which also featured baritone Titta Ruffo.

She married Dr. John Walter Hulihan in 1919. Her last recording for Victor Records was in 1935.

She died on July 29, 1976, in Pelham, New York. She is buried at Calvary Cemetery in Rutland, Vermont.

== Recordings ==
- "Bring Back My Soldier Boy to Me" (January 1919)
