= Bring Back My Soldier Boy to Me =

1918 war song by Frank Magine and Walter Hirsch

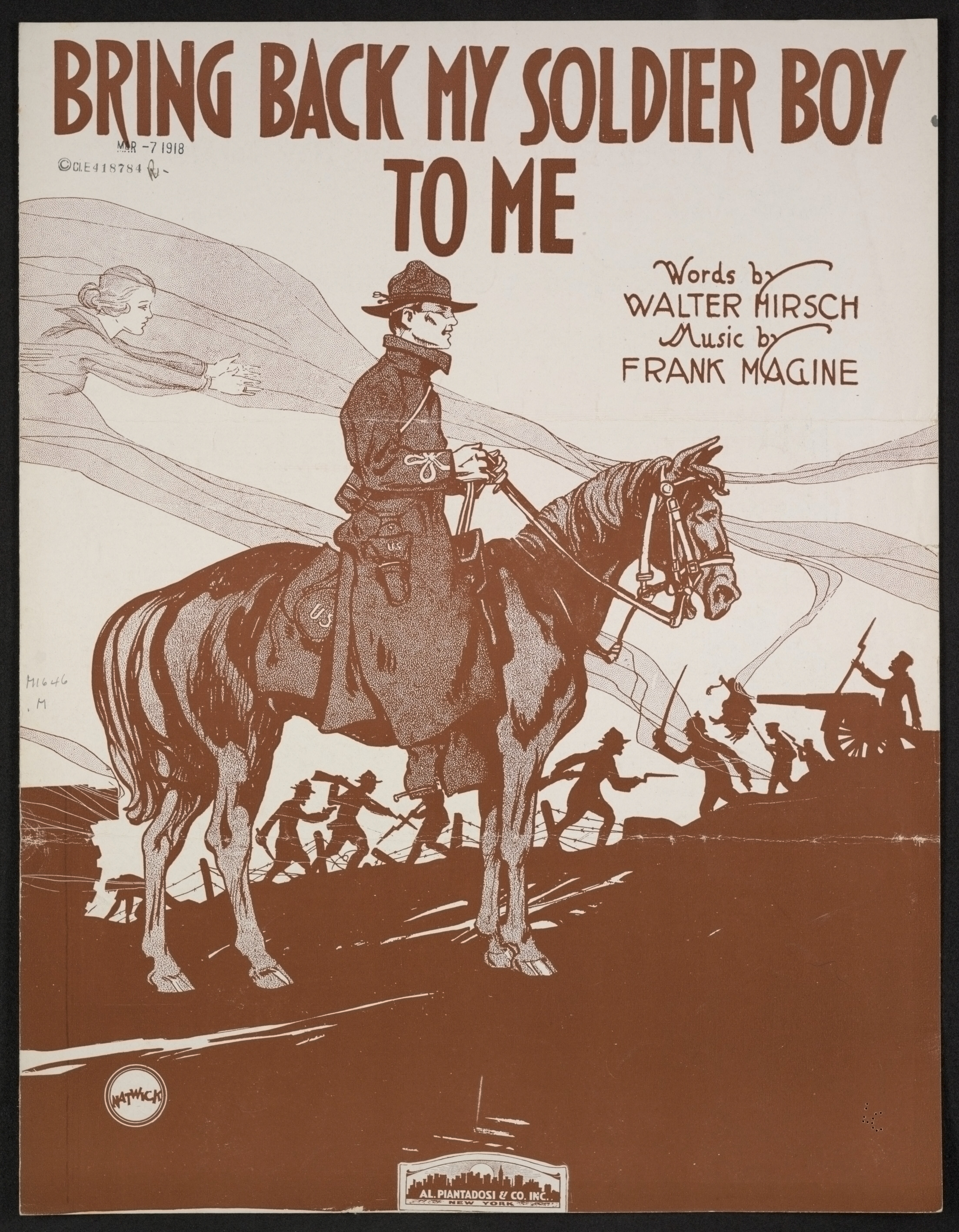
- Early sheet music cover

Song
- Published: 1918
- Genre: War song
- Composer: Frank Magine
- Lyricist: Walter Hirsch

"Bring Back My Soldier Boy to Me" is a World War I era song written by Walter Hirsch and composed by Frank Magine. The song was copyrighted by Al Piantadosi & Co., Inc., New York in 1918.

== Reception ==
"Bring Back My Soldier Boy to Me" was released by Olive Kline in January 1919. The song peaked at number eight on song charts in the US.

== Lyrics ==
First verse

Soldier boy, you've gone away,
In my heart I hope and pray
That you will return some day.
My soldier boy,
While you're over there,
There will be my prayer

Chorus

Oh! bring back,
Oh! bring back my soldier boy to me;
Watch him, protect him while he's across the sea.
I'm lonesome,
Each night I'm longing and praying constantly
That God will bring back my soldier boy to me

Second verse

Though you go, I know it's best,
You must go with all the rest,
Put your courage to test.
My soldier boy,
Ev'ry night and day
I will always pray
