= Thomas Cadmus =

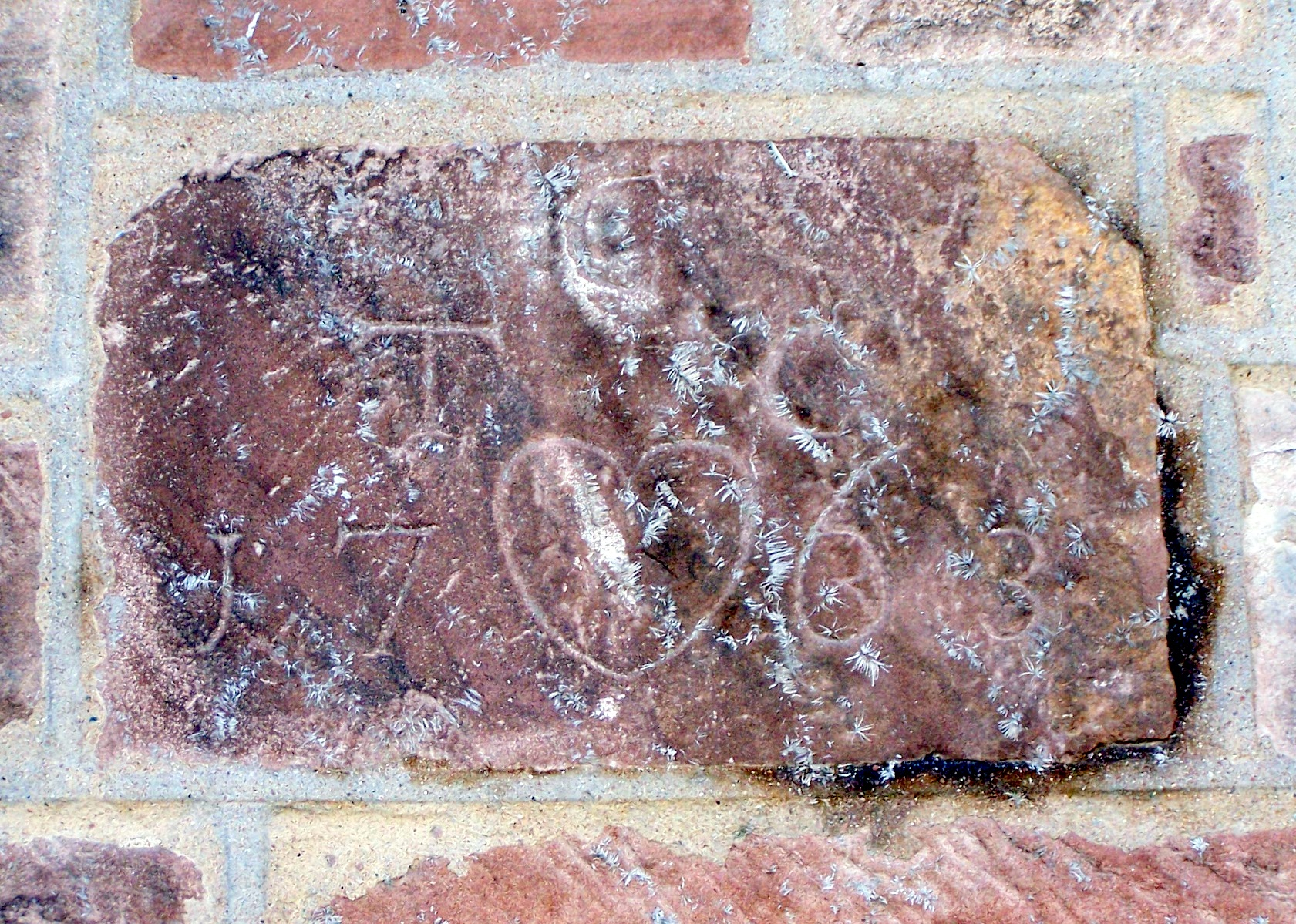
Datestone carved with Thomas Cadmus' initials, year (1763), and symbols.

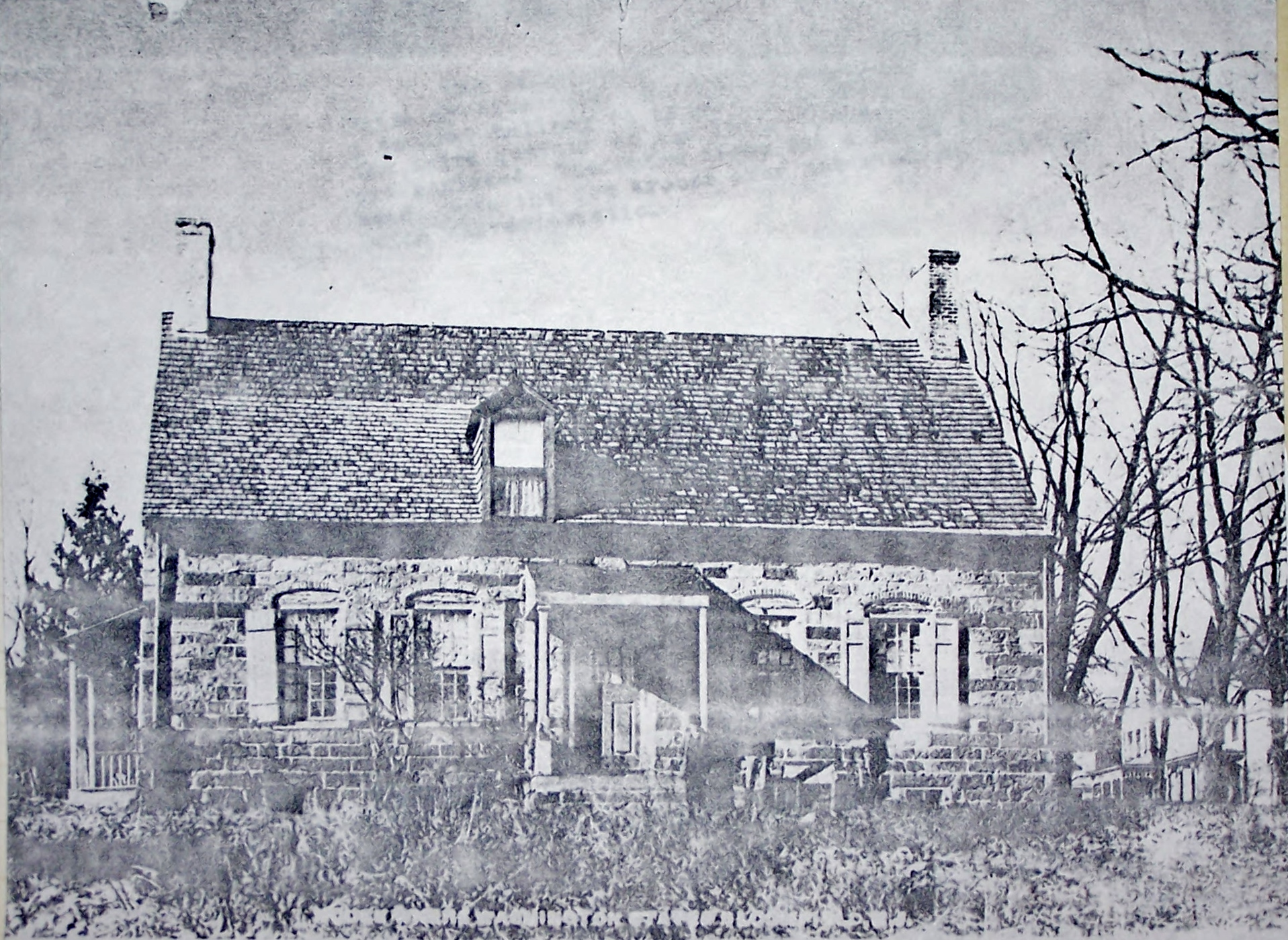
Cadmus House, from east

Thomas Cadmus (1736–1821) was a businessman, Revolutionary War officer and community leader in early Bloomfield, Essex County, New Jersey.

== Early life ==
Cadmus was born about 1736, and was baptized at the Reformed Church of Second River in Newark Township (now Belleville), New Jersey, the sixth child of Geertie Bras (1699-) and third child of her second husband, Abraham Cadmus (1708-1759), a lumber and stone merchant and storekeeper.

== Pre-Revolutionary Life ==
Unlike most 18th century northern New Jersey colonists of Dutch descent, Cadmus lived in the midst of an area primarily populated by settlers of Puritan (English) heritage in what is now the Watsessing neighborhood of Bloomfield. His business interests included farming, grist milling, real estate, and possibly quarrying.

On June 29, 1760, Thomas married his cousin, Pieterje Cadmus (1740-), daughter of Thomas Cadmus (1707-) and Cornelia Jeralemon (1711-); they had eleven children.

Cadmus built his residence in 1763, as indicated on the datestone. It replaced a logging cabin erected by Thomas’ grandfather Johannes Cadmus (1666-1759). The house was built of locally quarried brownstone, with four rooms on the first floor; a gable-ended loft; fireplaces on both ends; a cedar shingle roof; and a small entry stoop. The extant foundation consists of a fieldstone basement, massive hand-hewn joists, and flooring planks, some of which exceed 16 inches in width. A detached kitchen in the rear of the house contained a kitchen with a Dutch oven on one wall and slave quarters in the loft.

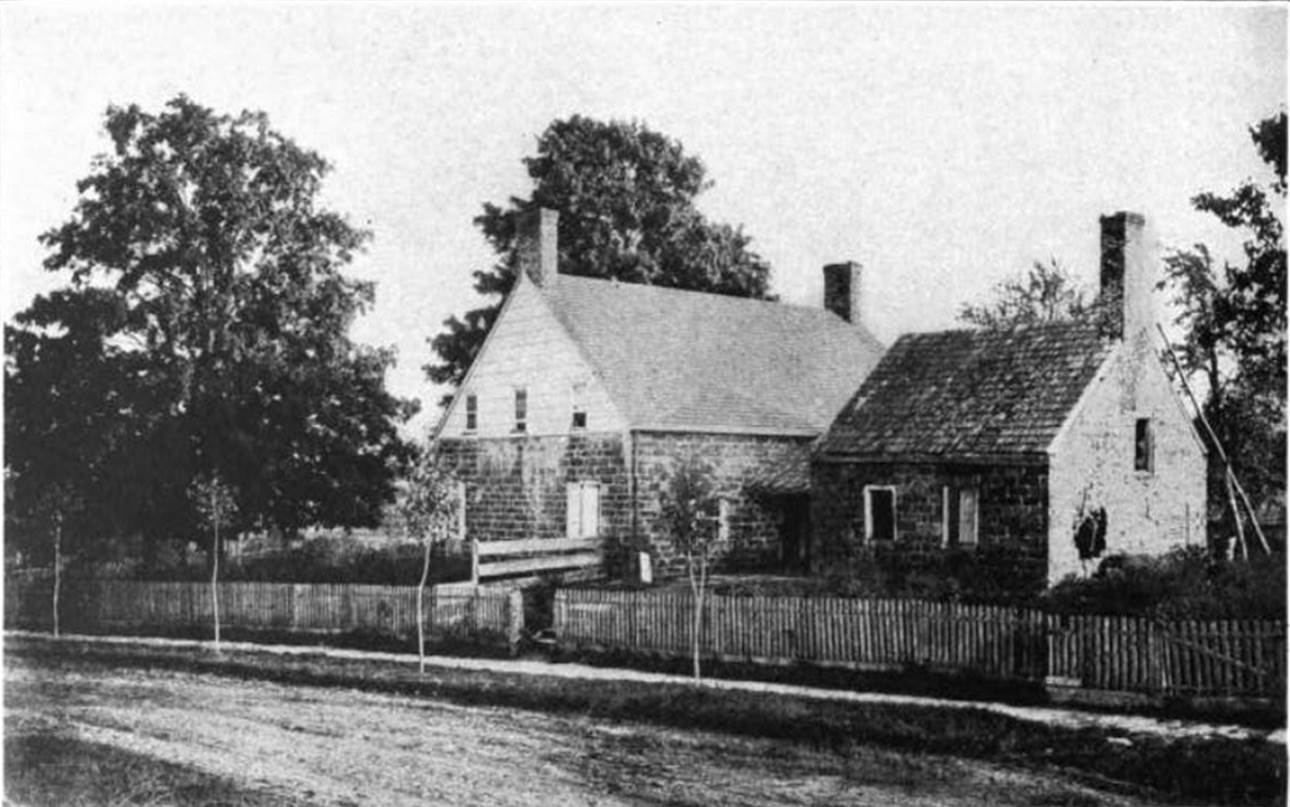
Picture of back of house, including kitchen/slave quarters.

== Revolutionary War ==
Cadmus served in the Revolutionary War as a lieutenant colonel of Essex militia. He led a contingent of New Jersey troops in the fortification of New York City and commanded a battalion in the Battle of Long Island. Suffering from gout, he resigned his line unit command, but continued to serve in logistics, notably during the Continental Army’s encampment at Jockey Hollow in Morristown, New Jersey.

Cadmus reportedly housed General George Washington's headquarters at his home during the American Revolutionary War. Washington held a court-martial for Captain Ambrose Lipscomb and Lieutenant Ebenezer West. The nature and extent of any other military planning conducted at the Cadmus House are not known. Cadmus also supported the Revolution financially, and his house was ransacked by British troops.

== Later life and death ==
In 1793, Cadmus was appointed as an Overseer of the Highways for Newark Township. He served as an elder of the Reformed Dutch Church of Second River from 1794 to 1797, and donated fourteen acres of land as a parsonage. He was also involved in the founding of the Presbyterian Society of Bloomfield (now the Bloomfield Presbyterian Church on the Green). He presided over its foundation-laying ceremony in 1796, reportedly placing a silver dollar into the mortar. He also led local farmers in the procession at the Society’s dedication ceremony the following year.

Thomas Cadmus died November 2, 1821. His remains, along with his wife’s and those of several of their children, were relocated from a family graveyard to Bloomfield Cemetery.

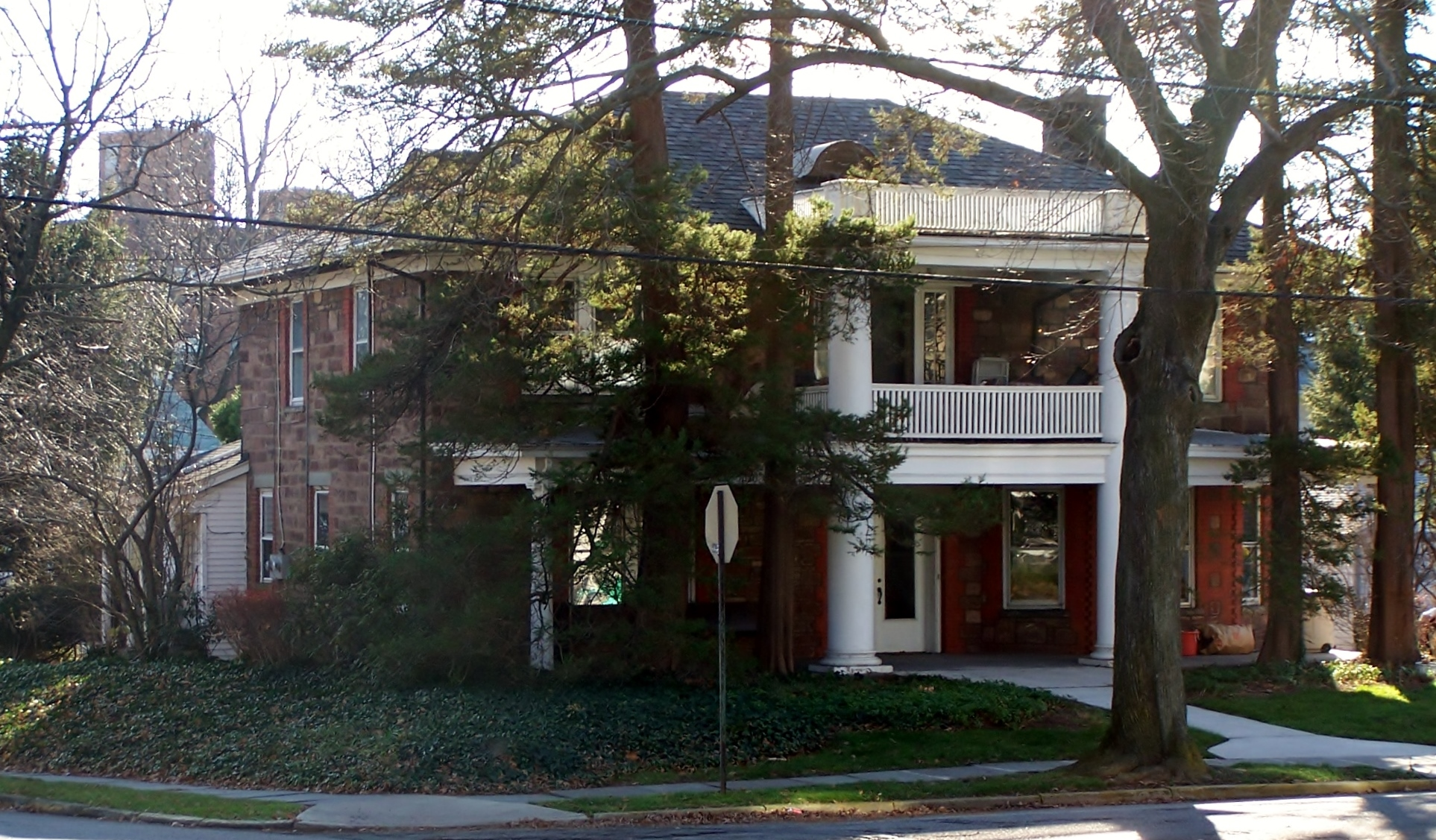
Cadmus House from the northwest
