= The Welcome Home =

- Origin: Athens, Georgia, United States
- Genres: indie rock
- Years active: 2014–present
- Members: Ryan Steffes; Ethan Langston; Lane Langston
- Past members: Ally Brady; Alec Parrish
- Website: www.thewelcomehomeband.com

The Welcome Home is an American indie rock band from Athens, Georgia composed of Ryan Steffes and brother duo Ethan and Lane Langston.

== History ==
=== Early years and formation ===
The band's founding members, Ryan Steffes and Ethan Langston, met in Athens, GA during their first year attending the University of Georgia in 2013. Steffes had lined up an opening gig at the local Athens venue "New Earth Music Hall" (now called Live Wire Athens) and put together a band to back him up which included Ethan Langston and Ally Brady. Following the show, Steffes asked the group if they would be interested in forming a band, which led to its creation. For several months, the band debated numerous names before finally deciding on The Welcome Home, a title formulated by Steffes. A few months later, in November 2014, the group officially added Ethan’s brother, Lane Langston, as its lead electric guitarist. And after working with temporary drummers for several months, the band added local Athens drummer, Alec Parrish, to its official lineup.

=== 2014-2015: A Land Outside of This ===
In the summer of 2015, the band recorded its first studio EP, titled “A Land Outside of This,” consisting of 5 original songs, preceded by an intro track. The release was accepted exceptionally online, as the band saw streaming numbers grow quickly on music platforms such as Spotify and Apple Music. This led to fan bases starting elsewhere in the country, and in some cases outside the country, as they saw reviews coming in from elsewhere in the world. Somewhat constrained by their university-related commitments, the band mostly played shows in Atlanta and Athens during the A Land Outside of This album cycle. This led to several opportunities in their hometown, such as being featured on the University of Georgia’s primary hype video for senior day, the final home football game of the 2015 season.

=== 2016-Present: Remember the Monarchs (Acoustic), New Studio Releases, and Lineup Changes ===
As the band’s following continued to grow, they joined bigger acts in Athens’ premier venues such as the Georgia Theatre and the 40 Watt Club. In the summertime of 2016, the group was featured on the main stage at the Athens based festival, Athfest, and on the festival’s annual compilation CD along with legendary Athens bands such as R.E.M. and Drive-By Truckers. They also self-recorded and released an acoustic version of their biggest hit and single from the first EP, Remember the Monarchs. Since then, the band has been working on writing and recording new music, which is set to release in the next several months. In mid 2017, the band experienced two major personnel changes. In May, the group announced that their long-time keyboardist and vocalist, Ally Brady, would be leaving the band for personal reasons, as she transitioned into a new stage of life. In October, the band's long-time drummer, Alec Parrish, announced that he would be leaving the band to pursue other drumming-related goals, leaving the band's lineup solely consisting of Steffes and the Langston brothers.

== Discography ==
- A Land Outside of This (2015)
- Remember the Monarchs (Acoustic) (2016)

== Members ==
- Ryan Steffes - lead vocals, guitar
- Ethan Langston - bass guitar, keys, vocals
- Lane Langston - lead electric guitar, vocals
