= Albert Wilfred Barbelle =

American illustrator (1887–1957)

- Born: February 15, 1887; Fall River, Massachusetts
- Died: February 3, 1957 (aged 70); New York City, New York
- Education: Art

Albert Wilfred Barbelle (1887–1957) was an American artist known well for his work in advertising, particularly cover art for sheet music of Tin Pan Alley. He also illustrated the first Mickey Mouse book.

== Early life ==
Albert Wilfred Barbelle was born on February 15, 1887, in Fall River, Massachusetts, to Wilfred and Marie Barbelle. He was of French Canadian and American descent. Barbelle was one of five children.

As a teenager, he began formal art study in Paris and London, and studied traditional and commercial art. In the 1910s, he returned from Europe to attend the Art Student League in New York City. He was contracted as an advertising and sheet music cover artist.

== Career ==
From 1912, Barbelle's covers started to be published, and he became a commercial artist and designer for the publishing house, Waterson, Berlin & Snyder. By the 1920s, Barbelle became a studio artist.

Albert Wilfred Barbelle became involved with music after marrying the composer and pianist, Paula Fuchs. She composed Dusting Stars Around the Moon, and Barbelle provided the cover art.

He was an active artist in the community and with the Staten Island Museum in New York City. Barbelle's career as a cover artist spanned for forty-four years.

== Personal ==
Barbelle was married three times. His first marriage in 1920 to a woman named Irene ended in divorce by the mid-1920s. In 1930, he married Franck Barbelle. They soon divorced. His final marriage to Paula Fuchs lasted until his death. Throughout their marriage, they lived in Manhattan and Richmond, New York. After marrying Fuchs, the couple remained in New York, later moving to Staten Island.

After two months of illness, Barbelle died on February 3, 1957, at age 69.

== Style and works ==
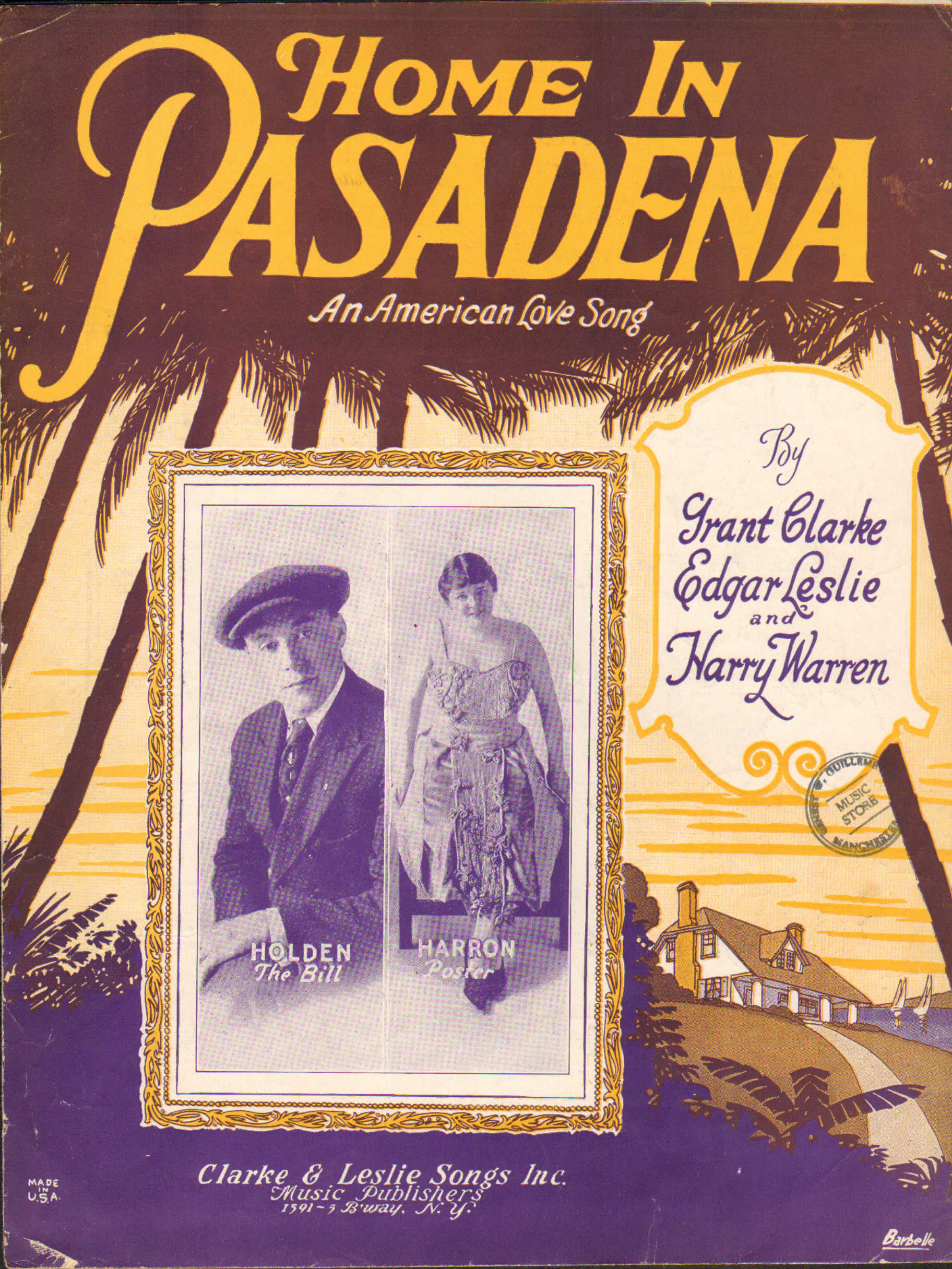
Barbelle's cover for "Home in Pasadena" (1922)

Barbelle's career spanned over forty years, and had a massive collection of works. Examples of his work include cover art for Cheer Up, Mother, On the Bay of Biscay, Gee! What a Wonderful Time We'll Have When the Boys Come Home, When the Yanks Come Marching Home, Welcome Home, When the Boys from Dixie Eat the Melon on the Rhine, and Big Chief Killahun.

His works were very versatile as they included various subjects and styles. While Barbelle's works included enhancing photographic subjects, fantasy creations, and silhouettes, his main subjects were women. Barbelle was very conscious of style, fashion, and color; he kept his works contemporary as possible, and he used more subtle color than his colleagues. Although he used subtle colors, he used the colors to highlight an element in a picture.

Today, many libraries, including the Pritzker Military Museum & Library, hold sheet music with his designs.

The Staten Island Museum holds an oil on canvas entitled A Corner of Staten Island.
