= Gee! What a Wonderful Time We'll Have When the Boys Come Home =

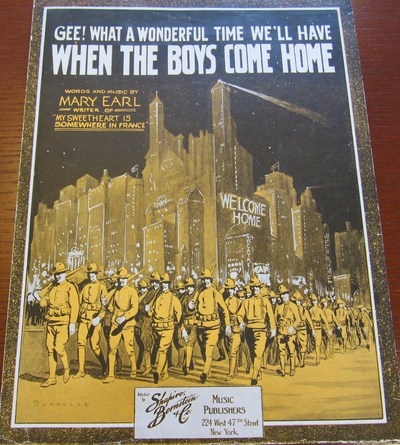

Song
- Released: 1917
- Label: Shapiro, Bernstein & Co.
- Songwriter: Mary Earl

"Gee! What a Wonderful Time We'll Have When the Boys Come Home" is a World War I era song released in 1917. Lyrics and music were written by Mary Earl. The song was published by Shapiro, Bernstein & Co. of New York, New York. It was written for both voice and piano. The sheet music cover was designed by artist Albert Wilfred Barbelle. On the cover are soldiers marching down a city street. A skyline is behind them, and the lights spell out, "Welcome Home."

The song calls for a celebration when the soldiers return home from war. The chorus is as follows:

Gee! What a wonderful time we'll have
When the boys come home
The girls will be dressed in their Sunday best
When the boys come home
The flags will fly and the bands will play
We'll all turn out with a smile so gay
And ev'ry one shouting, "Hip Hip Hooray:
When the boys come home

The sheet music can be found at Pritzker Military Museum & Library.
