= Welcome Home, Arkansas =

- Unincorporated community
- Location within Arkansas Location within the United States
- Coordinates: 35°45′55″N 92°46′22″W
- Country: United States
- State: Arkansas
- County: Searcy
- Elevation: 1,883 ft (574 m)
- Time zone: UTC-6 (Central (CST))
  - Summer (DST): UTC-5 (CDT)
- Area code: 870
- GNIS feature ID: 59395

Welcome Home is an unincorporated community in Searcy County, Arkansas, United States.
