= Welcome Home (1918 song) =

Song
- Language: English
- Published: 1918
- Songwriter(s): Lyricist: Bud Green; Composer: Edward G. Nelson

"Welcome Home" is a World War I song written by Bud Green and composed by Edward G. Nelson. The song was first published in 1918 by A.J. Stasny Music Co., in New York, NY. The sheet music cover depicts soldiers being welcomed home by men and women.

The sheet music can be found at the Pritzker Military Museum & Library.

== Bibliography ==
- Parker, Bernard S. World War I Sheet Music Vol 2. Jefferson: McFarland & Company, Inc., 2007. ISBN 0-7864-2799-X. OCLC 71790113
- Vogel, Frederick G. World War I Songs: A History and Dictionary of Popular American Patriotic Tunes, with Over 300 Complete Lyrics. Jefferson: McFarland & Company, Inc., 1995. ISBN 0-89950-952-5. OCLC 32241433
