= 2023 in American public domain =

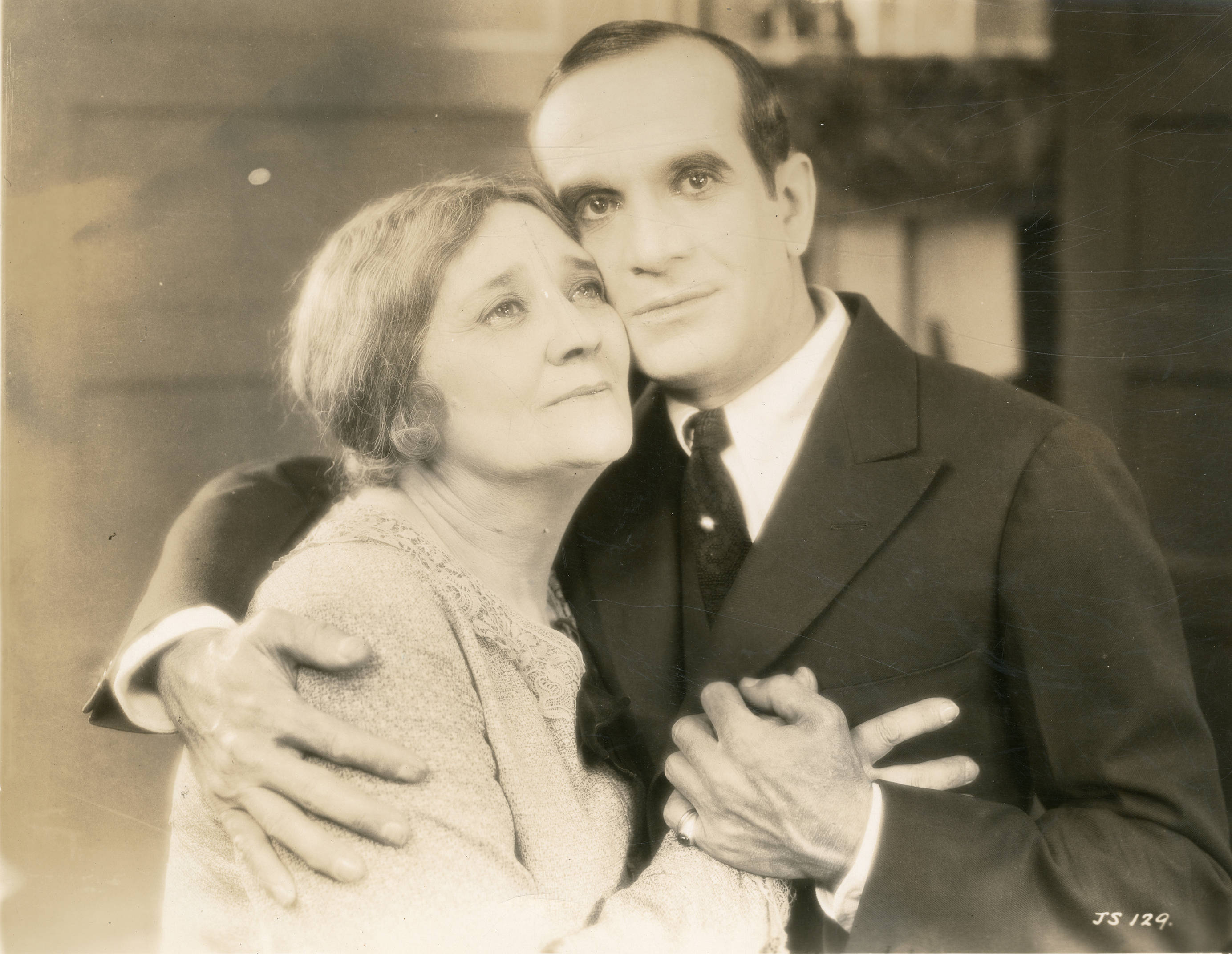
- The Jazz Singer, the first feature-length film with synchronized sound, became public domain in 2023.
- Nickname: Public Domain Day
- Date: January 1, 2023
- Frequency: Annually
- Country: United States
- Previous event: 2022 in American public domain
- Next event: 2024 in American public domain

Under the Copyright Term Extension Act, books published in 1927, films released in 1927, and other works published in 1927, entered the public domain in 2023. Unpublished works whose authors died in 1952 entered the public domain.

== Background ==
The Copyright Term Extension Act provides that works published in 1927 enter the public domain on January 1, 2023. Works that are published in 1927 and then translated in a later year may still be copyrighted. Sound recordings, however, are treated differently. Under the Music Modernization Act, all sound recordings published between the late 1800s (the earliest days of sound recording technology) and 1922 had entered the public domain in 2022, and sound recordings that were first published after 1922 would not enter the public domain until 100 years after their respective dates of publication. Therefore, no sound recordings entered the public domain in 2023.

== Films ==
Notable films that entered the public domain in 2023 included the following:

- Metropolis, directed by Fritz Lang
- The Jazz Singer, the first feature film with synchronized dialogue
- Wings, the winner of the first Academy Award for Best Picture
- Sunrise: A Song of Two Humans
- The Lodger: A Story of the London Fog, Alfred Hitchcock's first thriller
- The King of Kings, directed by Cecil B. DeMille
- London After Midnight, a lost film directed by Tod Browning
- The Way of All Flesh, a lost film directed by Victor Fleming
- 7th Heaven, the inspiration for the ending of the 2016 film La La Land
- The Kid Brother, starring Harold Lloyd
- The Battle of the Century, a Laurel and Hardy comedy
- Upstream, directed by John Ford
- Walt Disney's first nine Oswald the Lucky Rabbit cartoons
- Chicago
- The Unknown
- It
- The Great Leap
- The Cat and the Canary
- The Underworld
- The Beloved Rogue
- The Mystery of the Louvre
- Uncle Tom's Cabin
- Casey at the Bat
- Tarzan and the Golden Lion

== Literature ==
Notable literary works that entered the public domain in 2023 included:

- To the Lighthouse, by Virginia Woolf
- The Case-Book of Sherlock Holmes, by Arthur Conan Doyle
- Death Comes for the Archbishop, by Willa Cather
- Copper Sun, by Countee Cullen
- Now We Are Six, by A. A. Milne
- The Bridge of San Luis Rey, by Thornton Wilder
- Men Without Women, a collection of short stories by Ernest Hemingway
- Mosquitoes, by William Faulkner
- The Big Four, a Hercule Poirot story by Agatha Christie
- Twilight Sleep, by Edith Wharton
- The Gangs of New York, by Herbert Asbury
- The original editions of the first three Hardy Boys books (The Tower Treasure, The House on the Cliff, and The Secret of the Old Mill) by Franklin W. Dixon (pseudonymous author)
- Steppenwolf by Hermann Hesse, in its original German
- Amerika by Franz Kafka, in its original German
- The final installments of In Search of Lost Time by Marcel Proust, in their original French
- Emily's Quest, by Lucy Maud Montgomery
- Aspects of the Novel, by E. M. Forster
- The Colour Out of Space, by H. P. Lovecraft
- The Treasure of the Sierra Madre, by B. Traven
- The Tuesday Night Club, the first Miss Marple story, by Agatha Christie
- The Killers, by Ernest Hemingway
- Freddy Goes to Florida, by Walter Rollin Brooks
- In Another Country, also by Hemingway
- The Future of an Illusion, by Sigmund Freud
- Gentlemen Prefer Blondes, by Anita Loos

The Case-Book of Sherlock Holmes contained the last two short stories in the Canon of Sherlock Holmes, and was subject to a copyright dispute by Doyle's estate before its entry into the public domain.

In September 2023, comic book writer Bill Willingham released the Fables intellectual property into the public domain. Publisher DC Comics continues to claim ownership of the franchise and had an intent to enforce its copyright, but it has not attempted legal action against Willingham or any unauthorized uses of Fables since.

== Music ==
Notable musical compositions entering the public domain in 2023 included the following:

- "The Best Things in Life Are Free" by George Gard De Sylva, Lew Brown, and Ray Henderson; from the musical Good News
- "I Scream, You Scream, We All Scream for Ice Cream" by Howard Johnson, Billy Moll, and Robert A. King
- "Puttin' on the Ritz" by Irving Berlin
- The musical Funny Face by Ira and George Gershwin, including the titular song and "S' Wonderful"
- The musical Show Boat by Oscar Hammerstein II and Jerome Kern, including the song "Ol' Man River"
- "Backwater Blues", "Preaching the Blues", and "Foolish Man Blues" by Bessie Smith
- "Potato Head Blues" and "Gully Low Blues" by Louis Armstrong
- "Rusty Pail Blues", "Sloppy Water Blues", and "Soothin' Syrup Stomp" by Fats Waller
- "Black and Tan Fantasy" and "East St. Louis Toodle-O" by Bub Miley and Duke Ellington
- "Billy Goat Stomp", "Hyena Stomp", and "Jungle Blues" by Jelly Roll Morton
- "My Blue Heaven" by George Whiting and Walter Donaldson
- "Diane" by Erno Rapee and Lew Pollack
- "Mississippi Mud" by Harry Barris and James Cavanaugh
- "Blue Skies" by Irving Berlin
- "Dew-Dew-Dewey Day" by Al Sherman, Howard Johnson, and Charles Tobias
- "He Loves and She Loves" by Ira and George Gershwin
- "Me and My Shadow" by Al Jolson, Billy Rose, and Dave Dreyer
- Oedipus rex by Igor Stravinsky
