= Bob Rothberg =

American songwriter (1901–1938)

Bob Rothberg (October 28, 1901, New York City, New York – February 1, 1938, New York City, New York) was a Tin Pan Alley songwriter and lyricist. ASCAP 1936. Educ: New York public schools 1915; DeWitt Clinton High School, New York 1919; accountancy and law, New York Law School, Bachelor of Laws 1928. Educated in music and violin with private instructors. Rothberg is interred at United Hebrew Cemetery on Staten Island.

== Songwriting highlights ==
=== Popeye the Sailor cartoon songs ===
The Popeye Song Folio songbook is a collection of Popeye songs used in cartoons and movies.

- Why Am I So Beautiful (Bob Rothberg, Sammy Timberg). From "Morning, Noon and Night Club. 1937.

=== Betty Boop cartoon songs ===
- Be Human - Used in the cartoon "Be Human".
- Down in Our Alley - Used in the cartoon "Pudgy Takes a Bow-Wow".
- Every Little Nobody Is Somebody to Someone - Used in the cartoon "Little Nobody".
- Nothing To-day, Kind Sir - Used in the cartoon "The Hot Air Salesman".
- I've Got Those House Cleaning Blues - Used in the cartoon "House Cleaning Blues".
- I Want a Cowboy for a Sweetheart - Used in the cartoon "Whoops! I'm a Cowboy".
- Ya Gotta Have Pep - Used in the cartoon "More Pep".
- New Deal for Pets - Used in the cartoon "The New Deal Show".
- Service with a Smile - Used in the cartoon "Service With a Smile".
- Vote for Grampy - Used in the cartoon "The Candid Candidate".
- We Did It (Sammy Timberg and Bob Rothberg) - Used in the cartoon "We Did It".

=== Color Classics cartoon songs ===
- Bunny Mooning - Song title is "Everybody's Getting Ready for the Wedding".
- Chicken a la King - Song title is "Ducky Wucky".
- Christmas Comes But Once a Year - Song title is "X-mas Comes But Once a Year".
- The Cobweb Hotel - Song title is "Spend the Night at the Cobweb Hotel".
- Greedy Humpty Dumpty - Song title is "Humpty Dumpty".
- Hawaiian Birds - Song title is "Birds of a Feather in Hawaii".
- The Little Stranger - Song title is "Little Stranger".
- Peeping Penguins - Song title is "Curiosity Killed a Cat". Also used in the 1995 film Dangerous Minds.

=== Other cartoons ===
- Mickey Mouse's Birthday Party (Charles Tobias, Bob Rothberg and Joseph Meyer) - 1936 by Irving Berlin, Inc.

=== Songs ===
- A Little Robin Told Me So (Benny Davis, J. Fred Coots and Bob Rothberg). 1936 by Schuster & Miller, Inc. Recorded by Jack Shilkret & His Orchestra.
- All Through the Night (Bob Rothberg, Robert Bagar and Vincent Rose).
- And Then They Called It Love (Bob Rothberg, Joseph Meyer). 1937 by Irving Berlin, Inc.
- Are You Lovable? (Bob Rothberg, Terry Shand). 1933 by Leo. Feist, Inc.
- Bolero Madness (Bob Rothberg, Dick Leibert). 1934 by Donaldson, Douglas & Gumble, Inc.
- Candle-Light (Henry Halstead, Lionel G. Moran and Bob Rothberg). 1936 by Southern Music Pub. Co., Inc. Signature song of Henry Halstead and his Orchestra.
- Close To Me (Bob Rothberg, John Klenner). 1933 by Olman Music Corporation. Featured by Bing Crosby.
- Congratulate Me (Lou Handman, Bob Rothberg). 1934 by Remick Music. Included on the soundtrack to the 1974 feature film The Front Page (film) starring Jack Lemmon and Walter Matthau.
- The Debutante Waltz (Bob Rothberg, George W. Meyer and Peter Tinturin). 1934 by Famous Music Corp.
- Did She Ask For Me (Bob Rothberg, Alan Grey). 1934 by Remick Music.
- Hello Helen (Bob Rothberg, Terry Shand). 1934 by DeSylva, Brown and Henderson, Inc.
- I Couldn't Be Mad At You (Bob Rothberg, Joseph Meyer). 1936 by Irving Berlin, Inc.
- I Want To Be With You (Bob Rothberg, Adrian Nomis and Ray Bloch). 1936 by Superior Music Inc.
- I'm Gonna Put You In Your Place (and Your Place is in My Arms) (Bob Rothberg, and Joseph Meyer). 1937 by Joe Davis, Inc. Recorded by Fats Waller.
- It Ain't Right (Bob Rothberg, Joseph Meyer). 1936 by Irving Berlin, Inc.
- It Only Goes To Show You (Bob Rothberg, Joseph Meyer). 1936 by Crawford Music Corporation.
- Let's Begin Again (Bob Rothberg, Milton Berle and Doris Tauber). 1937 by Exclusive Publications Inc.
- Lonely Waltz (Bob Rothberg, Terry Shand and Freddy Martin). 1936 by Irving Berlin, Inc. Theme song of Freddy Martin and his Orchestra.
- Modernistic Mood (Bob Rothberg, Robert Bagar and Vincent Rose).
- Nice Goin' (Bob Rothberg, Joseph Meyer). 1936 by Chappell & Co. Inc.
- Night Wind (Bob Rothberg, Dave Pollock). 1934 by Donaldson, Douglas & Gumble Inc. Recorded by Fats Waller and His Rhythm 1035-01-05 with Fats on organ. Recorded by the American jazz singer Ella Fitzgerald and included on the 1957 album Like Someone in Love. Recorded by Taft Jordan and the Mob. Recorded by Janet Klein and included on her 2004 release Living in Sin.
- Rhumba-Man(Start Shakin' Those Shakers) (Bob Rothberg, Nat Simon and Harold Raymond). 1935 by Superior Music, Inc.
- Summer Serenade (Bob Rothberg, Robert Bagar and Vincent Rose). 1934.
- There's a Silver Moon on the Golden Gate (Charles Tobias, Bob Rothberg and Joseph Meyer). 1936 by Irving Berlin, Inc.
- There's a Yellow Moon on the Purple Sage (Bob Rothberg, Alan Grey). 1934 by Keit Music Corp.
- What Do I Have to Do? (Bob Rothberg, Joseph Meyer). 1937 by Marlo Music Corp.
- What's the Use of Getting Used to You? (Bob Rothberg, Ned Miller and Charles Rinker). 1934 by Donaldson, Douglas & Gumble, Inc.
- When It's Lullaby Time in the Hills (Bob Rothberg, Vincent Rose). 1934 by Donaldson, Douglas & Gumble, Inc.
- Why Don't You Try? (Bob Rothberg, Joseph Meyer). 1937 by Irving Berlin, Inc.
- You Or No One (Bob Rothberg, Peter Tinturin). 1933 by Olman Music Corporation. Performed by Recorded by Guy Lombardo and The Royal Canadians.
- You Painted Pictures (Bob Rothberg, John Klenner). From the songbook House of Soul/House of Blues (No. 111).
- You're The Picture (I'm the Frame) (Bob Rothberg, Jack Golden). 1935 by Ager, Yellen & Bornstein, Inc. Recorded by Fats Waller.
- You've Been Reading My Mail (Bob Rothberg, George W. Meyer). Recorded by Fats Waller.
