= 2024 in American public domain =

- One of the most notable works that entered the public domain in 2024 is the Steamboat Willie depiction of Mickey Mouse. The Walt Disney Company had previously lobbied for the extension of copyright length in the United States in order to prevent its characters, especially Mickey, from entering the public domain, resulting in the Copyright Term Extension Act.
- Nickname: Public Domain Day
- Date: January 1, 2024
- Frequency: Annually
- Country: United States
- Previous event: 2023 in American public domain
- Next event: 2025 in American public domain

Under the Copyright Term Extension Act, books published in 1928, films released in 1928, and other works published in 1928, entered the public domain in the United States in 2024. Sound recordings that were published in 1923 entered the public domain.

The most famous work to enter the public domain in 2024 is Walt Disney and Ub Iwerks's animated film Steamboat Willie, which was the first released cartoon, and third overall appearance, of Mickey Mouse, the flagship character and mascot of The Walt Disney Company. Prior to 2024, the short film had been under Disney's ownership. Other famous characters' original iterations such as A. A. Milne's Tigger and J. M. Barrie's Peter Pan also entered the public domain.

Notable films such as Charlie Chaplin's The Circus and Harold Lloyd's Speedy and notable literature such as Lady Chatterley's Lover by D. H. Lawrence also entered the public domain. Notable songs entering the public domain included "I Can't Give You Anything but Love, Baby", "Makin' Whoopee", and "You're the Cream in My Coffee".

== Background ==
The Copyright Term Extension Act provides that works published in 1928 enter the public domain on January 1, 2024. Works that are published in 1928 and then translated in a later year may still be copyrighted. Sound recordings are treated differently and sound recordings from 1923 entered the public domain in 2024.

== Films ==
Steamboat Willie is one of the most discussed entrants to the public domain in 2024.

The earliest incarnation of Mickey Mouse as well as Minnie Mouse entered the public domain in 2024. The most famous early media featuring these characters is Steamboat Willie, which is notable not only as their public debut, but also as one of the first animated short films with synchronized sound. Two earlier-produced cartoons starring Mickey and Minnie, Plane Crazy and The Gallopin' Gaucho, also entered the public domain in their silent versions the same year; the sound versions of these shorts did not enter the public domain until 2025.

Other notable films that entered the public domain in the United States in 2024 include The Cameraman starring Buster Keaton, Lights of New York (the first all-talking full-length feature film), Charlie Chaplin's The Circus, Carl Theodor Dreyer's The Passion of Joan of Arc, Lloyd Bacon's The Singing Fool starring Al Jolson (the follow-up to Jolson's earlier feature The Jazz Singer), Harold Lloyd's final silent theatrical release Speedy, the all-singing cowboy film In Old Arizona, Paul Leni's The Man Who Laughs, the Laurel and Hardy comedy Should Married Men Go Home?, The Wind with Lillian Gish, Erich von Stroheim's The Wedding March, King Vidor's The Crowd and Show People, The Last Command and Street Angel (whose respective stars, Emil Jannings and Janet Gaynor, were the recipients of the first Academy Awards for Best Actor and Best Actress), Walt Disney's remaining Oswald the Lucky Rabbit cartoons, Sergei Eisenstein's October: Ten Days That Shook the World, George B. Seitz's The Circus Kid, John Ford's Four Sons, Beggars of Life with Wallace Beery, Ernst Lubitsch's The Patriot, and Josef von Sternberg's The Docks of New York.

== Literature ==
The House at Pooh Corner by A. A. Milne, introducing the character Tigger, entered the public domain in the United States in 2024, as did Peter Pan; or, the Boy Who Wouldn't Grow Up by J. M. Barrie. The original German language publications of The Threepenny Opera by Bertolt Brecht, All Quiet on the Western Front by Erich Maria Remarque, and Urformen der Kunst by Karl Blossfeldt also entered the public domain in the United States. However, the English-language translations of Remarque's novel and Brecht's play would remain copyrighted until 2025 and 2029, respectively.

Additional notable literary works that entered the American public domain in 2024 include, among other books, Lady Chatterley's Lover by D. H. Lawrence, Orlando by Virginia Woolf, Dark Princess by W.E.B. Du Bois, Home to Harlem by Claude McKay, The Well of Loneliness by Radclyffe Hall, Millions of Cats by Wanda Gág (the oldest American picture book still in print), Decline and Fall by Evelyn Waugh, The Mystery of the Blue Train by Agatha Christie, West-Running Brook by Robert Frost, The Front Page by Ben Hecht and Charles MacArthur, Tarzan, Lord of the Jungle by Edgar Rice Burroughs, Coming of Age in Samoa by Margaret Mead, The Unpleasantness at the Bellona Club by Dorothy L. Sayers, Point Counter Point by Aldous Huxley, Meet the Tiger by Leslie Charteris introducing "The Saint" (Simon Templar), The Trumpeter of Krakow by Eric P. Kelly, Last Post by Ford Madox Ford, The Tower by W. B. Yeats, Mr. Blettsworthy on Rampole Island by H. G. Wells, Nadja by André Breton, Memoirs of a Fox-Hunting Man by Siegfried Sassoon, Gypsy Ballads by Federico García Lorca, the Argentine comic strip Las Aventuras de Don Gil Contento by Dante Quinterno introducing the character Patoruzú, and the original editions of The Missing Chums, Hunting for Hidden Gold, and The Shore Road Mystery from The Hardy Boys series by pseudonymous author Franklin W. Dixon.

== Music ==
=== Musical compositions ===
The Duke Center for the Study of the Public Domain list of musical compositions entering the public domain included:

- Animal Crackers by Bert Kalmar and Harry Ruby
- Beau Koo Jack lyrics by Walter Melrose and music by Alex Hill and Louis Armstrong
- Empty Bed Blues by J. C. Johnson
- I Can't Give You Anything but Love, Baby lyrics by Dorothy Fields and music by Jimmy McHugh
- I Wanna Be Loved by You music by Harry Ruby and Herbert Stothart with lyrics by Bert Kalmar
- Let's Do It, Let's Fall in Love by Cole Porter
- Mack the Knife music by Kurt Weill and lyrics by Bertolt Brecht
- Makin' Whoopee music by Walter Donaldson and lyrics by Gus Kahn
- Pick Pocket Blues by Bessie Smith
- Ramona lyrics by L. Wolfe Gilbert and music by Mabel Wayne
- Sonny Boy by Buddy DeSylva, Ray Henderson, and Lew Brown
- There's a Rainbow 'Round My Shoulder by Al Jolson, Billy Rose, and Dave Dreyer
- When You're Smiling by Mark Fisher, Larry Shay, and Joe Goodwin
- You're the Cream in My Coffee by George Gard DeSylva, Lew Brown, and Ray Henderson

=== Sound recordings ===
The Duke Center for the Study of the Public Domain list of sound recordings entering the public domain included:

- Bambalina recorded by the Ray Miller Orchestra
- Charleston recorded by James P. Johnson
- Dipper Mouth Blues recorded by King Oliver’s Creole Jazz Band, featuring Louis Armstrong
- Downhearted Blues recorded by Bessie Smith and the Tennessee Ten
- Down South Blues recorded by Hannah Sylvester and The Virginians
- Froggie More recorded by King Oliver’s Creole Jazz Band, featuring Louis Armstrong
- Lawdy, Lawdy Blues recorded by Ida Cox
- Moonshine Blues recorded by Ma Rainey
- Parade of the Wooden Soldiers recorded by Paul Whiteman and his orchestra
- Southern Blues recorded by Ma Rainey
- Swingin’ Down the Lane recorded by the Isham Jones Orchestra, The Shannon Four, and The Columbians
- That American Boy of Mine recorded by Paul Whiteman and his orchestra
- Tin Roof Blues recorded by the New Orleans Rhythm Kings
- Who's Sorry Now recorded by Lewis James, The Happy Six, and the Original Memphis Five
- Wolverine Blues recorded by the Benson Orchestra of Chicago
- Yes! We Have No Bananas recorded by Billy Jones, Furman and Nash, Eddie Cantor, Belle Baker, and The Lanin Orchestra

== Art ==
- Tower of Babel, woodcut by M. C. Escher

Publication records for other artworks created in 1928 have not been located, so their copyright status is unknown.

== Reception ==
Public Domain Day 2024 attracted more media interest than any Public Domain Day before it. It was discussed by multiple media outlets including CBS News, NPR's Morning Edition, the Associated Press, Variety, The New York Times, The Washington Post, the Los Angeles Times, Marketplace, The Wall Street Journal, the BBC, and local radio stations WBUR-FM and WNYC.

== See also ==
- 2024 in public domain
