= When You're a Long, Long Way from Home =

1914 song written by Sam M. Lewis and composed by George W. Meyer

Song
- Language: English
- Published: 1914
- Composer(s): George W. Meyer
- Lyricist(s): Sam M. Lewis

"When You're a Long, Long Way from Home" is a World War I song written by Sam M. Lewis and composed by George W. Meyer. This song was published in 1914 by Broadway Music Corp.

The sheet music can be found at the Pritzker Military Museum & Library.
