= Just Like Washington Crossed the Delaware, General Pershing Will Cross the Rhine =

1918 song by George Meyer and Howard Johnson

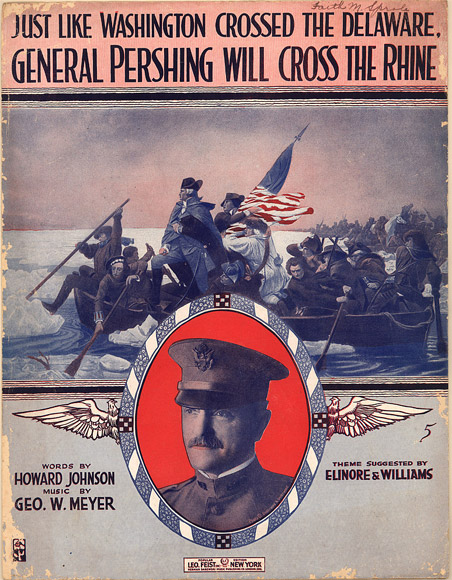
- Sheet music cover

Song
- Published: 1918
- Composer: George W. Meyer
- Lyricist: Howard Johnson

"Just Like Washington Crossed the Delaware, General Pershing Will Cross the Rhine" is a 1918 song composed by George W. Meyer, with lyrics written by Howard Johnson and published by Leo Feist, Inc.

Based upon sheet music sales estimates from 1918, it is believed that "Just Like Washington Crossed the Delaware, General Pershing Will Cross the Rhine" would have reached number four of the top 100 songs of 1918 with a recording by the Peerless Quartet. A later recording by Prince's Orchestra would have been number seven of the top 100 songs of 1918.

== Sheet music and analysis ==
The 1918 publication features a cover illustration by Rosenbaum Studios of a painting of George Washington crossing the Delaware River with a picture of General Pershing below it. The sheet music was reprinted thrice.

The song describes the American effort in Germany during World War I and draws a direct parallel to the American Revolution. It describes the hope that General Pershing will have the same success as George Washington.
