= Popeye Song Folio =

1936 album

The Popeye Song Folio is a collection of 24 songs issued by Popular Melodies, Inc. 1619 Broadway, New York City in 1936. They contain the tunes played in the various Popeye cartoon short series directed by Dave Fleischer.

== Popeye Song Folio preface ==
When Vee and I were little girls, of course we played with toys
But we were not as fortunate as all you girls and boys
A doll—a game—and Mother Goose--a sled—a big tin horn
We had to be content with these, 'cause Popeye wasn't born
Today we meet him everywhere, and so we can't complain
'Cause even tho we're both grown up, we feel like kids again
We see him in the funnies, on the screen, in picture books
He's strong, and brave, and loyal, tho he isn't much for looks
But Vee and I decided there's one place he belongs
That's why we go together and wrote these little songs
We showed them all to Popeye, who gave us his okay
He said, "Ahoy there kids! Come on--let's hear you sing and play"
So open up the pages, and you will find a lot
Of little tingle jingle songs from Popeye"--Vee and Tot

There isn't much that we can add except a line or two,
to say that we have written songs that Popeye sang to you,
You've heard them on the screen, no doubt, and now you'll find them here,
So give'er sail and heave away in voices aloud and clear--
If you should ever find that being happy's quite a job,
Just open up this book and call on Popeye"--Sam and Bob

== The songs ==
1. "I'm Popeye the Sailor Man" – Words and Music by Sammy Lerner. Theme song of all Paramount's "Popeye the Sailor" cartoons
2. "Sing a Song of Popeye" – Words by Tot Seymour and Music by Vee Lawnhurst
3. "Moving Man" – Words by Bob Rothberg and Music by Sammy Timberg. Featured in Paramount-Fleischer's cartoon Let's Get Movin'
4. "I'm One of the Jones Boys" – Words by Tot Seymour and Music by Vee Lawnhurst
5. "Pooey To You From Me" – Words by Tot Seymour and Music by Vee Lawnhurst
6. "I Wanna Be a Lifeguard" – Words by Bob Rothberg and Music by Sammy Timberg. Featured in Paramount-Fleischer's cartoon I Wanna Be a Life Guard
7. "I'm King of the Mardi Gras" – Words by Bob Rothberg and Music by Sammy Timberg. Featured in Paramount-Fleischer's cartoon King of the Mardi Gras
8. "I'll Be Seein' Ya In The Movies" – Words by Tot Seymour and Music by Vee Lawnhurst
9. "Brotherly Love" – Words by Bob Rothberg and Music by Sammy Timberg. Featured in Paramount-Fleischer's cartoon Brotherly Love
10. "I Want a Clean Shaven Man" – Words by Dave Fleischer and Music by Sammy Timberg. Featured in Paramount-Fleischer's cartoon A Clean Shaven Man
11. "Hamburger Mine" – Words by Bob Rothberg and Music by Sammy Timberg. Featured in Paramount-Fleischer's cartoon What-No Spinach?
12. "The Looney Goon" – Words by Tot Seymour and Music by Vee Lawnhurst
13. "Won't You Come and Climb the Mountain With Me" – Words by Bob Rothberg and Music by Sammy Timberg# "Featured in Paramount-Fleischer's cartoon I-Ski Love-Ski You-Ski
14. "Popeye on Parade" – Words by Tot Seymour and Music by Vee Lawnhurst
15. "Olive Oyl's Family Reunion" – Words by Tot Seymour and Music by Vee Lawnhurst
16. "I Spy a Spy" – Words by Tot Seymour and Music by Vee Lawnhurst
17. "I Wants What I Wants When I Wants It" – Words by Tot Seymour and Music by Vee Lawnhurst
18. "Let's Build a Bridge Today" – Words by Bob Rothberg and Music by Sammy Timberg. Featured in Paramount-Fleischer's cartoon Bridge Ahoy!
19. "Strike Me Pink Do I See Red" – Words by Tot Seymour and Music by Vee Lawnhurst.
20. "I'm Sindbad the Sailor" – Words by Bob Rothberg and Music by Sammy Timberg. Featured in Paramount-Fleischer's cartoon Popeye the Sailor Meets Sinbad the Sailor. Included on the soundtrack to the 2001 feature film Baby Boy
21. "Ain'tcha Got No Ettyket" – Words by Tot Seymour and Music by Vee Lawnhurst
22. "Popeye's Eye Popped Out of His Head" – Words by Tot Seymour and Music by Vee Lawnhurst
23. "The Land of Popeye" – Words by Tot Seymour and Music by Vee Lawnhurst
24. "Jump Jeep I Give You Orchids" – Words by Tot Seymour and Music by Vee Lawnhurst
