= I Ain't Got Weary Yet! =

1918 song written by Howard Johnson and composed by Percy Wenrich

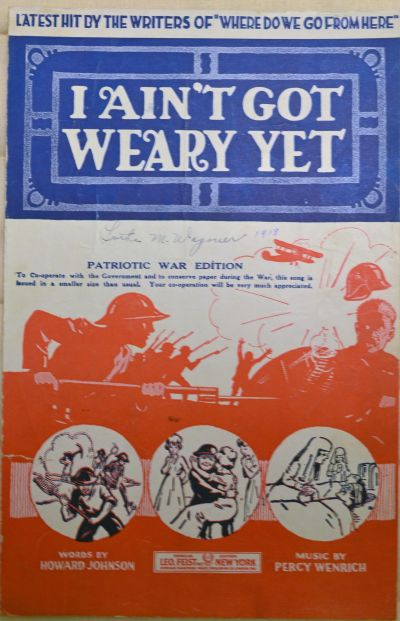
- Sheet music cover

Song
- Language: English
- Published: 1918
- Composer(s): Percy Wenrich
- Lyricist(s): Howard Johnson

"I Ain't Got Weary Yet!" is a World War I song written by Howard Johnson and composed by Percy Wenrich. It was published in 1918 by Leo Feist Inc., in New York City. The sheet music cover depicts Americans overtaking Germans while a plane flies overhead. Three vignettes depict soldiers digging, a soldier holding his bride, and a nurse tending to a wounded soldier.

The sheet music can be found at the Pritzker Military Museum & Library.
