= It Ain't Right =

"It Ain't Right" is a popular song written by Bob Rothberg and Joseph Meyer. It was recorded by Stuff Smith in July 1936 at Vocalion Records. Smith performed at the Onyx Club on 52nd Street in New York City during the 1930s.

Others to record the song include:

- The Red Clay Ramblers, included on their 1986 release It Ain't Right
- The Red Stick Ramblers, included on their 2005 release Right Key, Wrong Keyhole
- The electro-swing band Caravan Palace features samples from this piece in their song "Rock It For Me", from their 2012 album titled "Panic".
- British Electro-Swing DJ Jamie Berry remixed it in 2016 as part of the “Bombinate EP”, and again in 2022 for the “Antiquity EP”.
- The Austrian electro-swing DJ Parov Stelar features samples from this piece in his song "Mama Talking", from his 2017 album "The Burning Spider".
- Italian Electro-Swing DJ and member of the Swingrowers, Pisk, remixed it in 2018.
- New Zealand Electro-Swing DJ, Odd Chap, remixed it in 2020.
