= Steamboat Willie =

1928 film by Walt Disney and Ub Iwerks

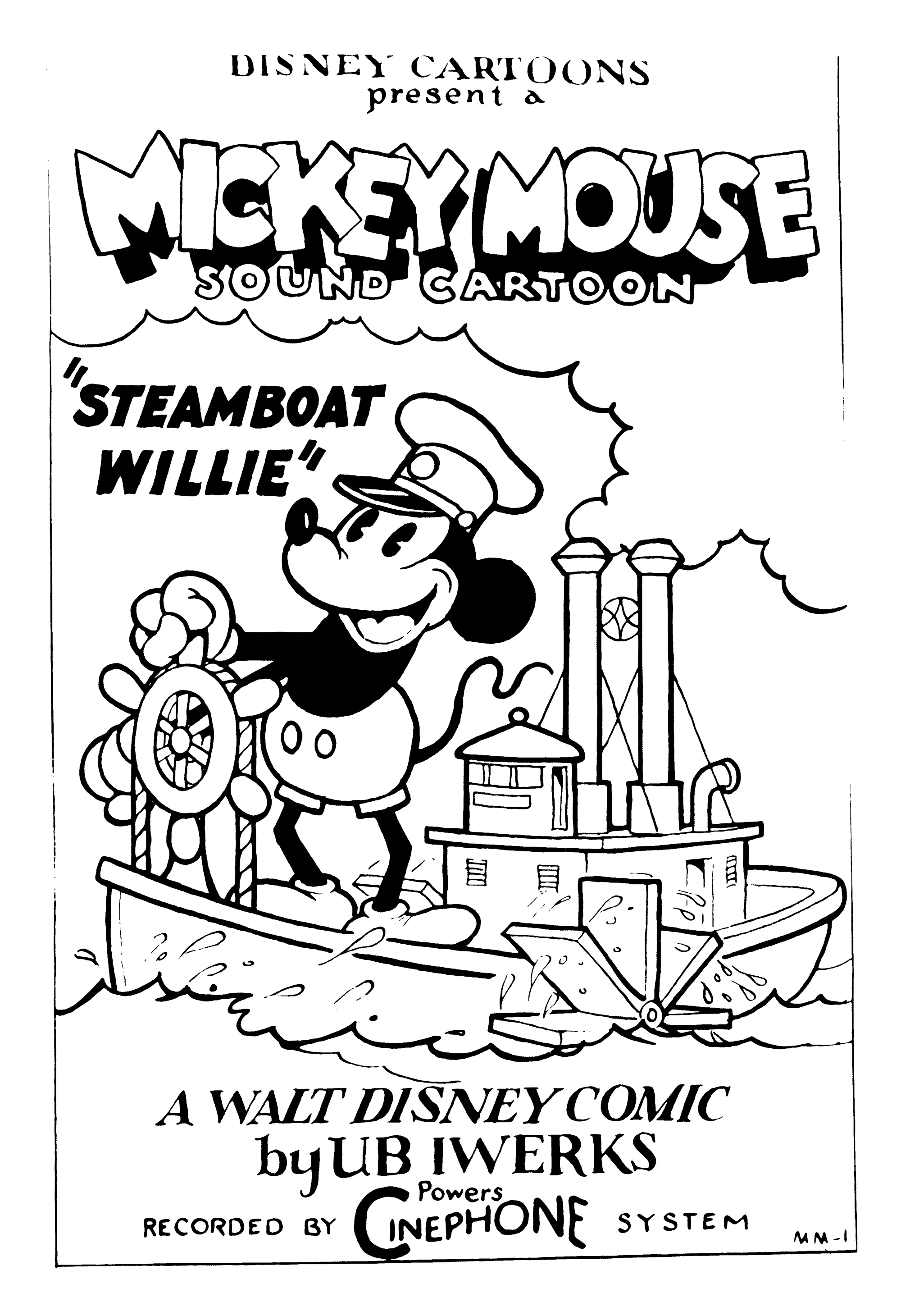
- Theatrical release poster
- Directed by: Walt Disney; Ub Iwerks
- Story by: Walt Disney; Ub Iwerks
- Produced by: Walt Disney
- Starring: Walt Disney
- Music by: Wilfred Jackson; Bert Lewis
- Animation by: Ub Iwerks; Wilfred Jackson; Johnny Cannon
- Color process: Black-and-white
- Production company: Disney Cartoons
- Distributed by: Celebrity Productions
- Release date: November 18, 1928 (US)
- Running time: 7:47
- Country: United States
- Language: English
- Budget: $4,986.69

Steamboat Willie is a 1928 American animated short film directed by Walt Disney and Ub Iwerks. It was produced in black-and-white by Disney Cartoons and was released by Pat Powers' Celebrity Productions. The cartoon is considered the official debut of Mickey Mouse and Minnie Mouse, although both appeared months earlier in a test screening of Plane Crazy and the then-unreleased The Gallopin' Gaucho. Steamboat Willie is the third film in the Mickey Mouse series to have been produced, but it is the first to have been officially distributed, because Disney had seen The Jazz Singer (1927) and became determined to produce one of the first fully synchronized sound cartoons.

Steamboat Willie is one of the first cartoons with synchronized sound, and one of the first cartoons to feature a fully post-produced soundtrack, which distinguished it from earlier sound cartoons, such as Inkwell Studios's Song Car-Tunes (1924–1926), My Old Kentucky Home (1926), and Van Beuren Studios's Dinner Time (1928). Disney believed that synchronized sound was the future of film.

The soundtrack was arranged by Wilfred Jackson and Bert Lewis, and it included the songs "Steamboat Bill", a composition popularized by baritone Arthur Collins during the 1910s, and the popular 19th-century folk song "Turkey in the Straw". The film's title may be a parody of the Buster Keaton film Steamboat Bill, Jr. (1928), which is a reference to the song by Collins. Disney performed all of the voices in the film's little intelligible dialogue. (Note: The only spoken words are when the parrot says "Help! Man overboard!" and "Hope you don't feel hurt, big boy!")

Steamboat Willie became the most popular cartoon of its time. It has received wide critical acclaim, for introducing one of the world's most popular cartoon characters and for its technical innovation. It is often considered one of the most influential and greatest cartoons ever made. Animators voted it the 13th-greatest cartoon of all time in the 1994 book The 50 Greatest Cartoons, and in 1998, the film was selected by the United States Library of Congress for preservation in the National Film Registry. After having its copyright previously extended multiple times by the United States Congress following extensive lobbying by The Walt Disney Company, Steamboat Willie entered the U.S. public domain on January 1, 2024.

== Background ==
Mickey Mouse was created as a replacement for Oswald the Lucky Rabbit, an earlier character created by Disney for Winkler Pictures but owned at the time by Universal Pictures. The first two Mickey Mouse films produced, silent versions of Plane Crazy and The Gallopin' Gaucho, had failed to gain a distributor. According to Roy O. Disney, Walt Disney was inspired to create a sound cartoon to greatly increase its appeal, after watching The Jazz Singer (1927). The character of Pete predates Steamboat Willie by three years, having appeared as the villain to both Oswald and Disney's first ever cartoon hero, Julius the Cat (a character similar to Felix the Cat) starting with Alice Solves the Puzzle (1925), though he was originally depicted as a bear.

Steamboat Willie became erroneously and widely recognized as the first cartoon with fully synchronized sound. From May 1924 to September 1926, Dave and Max Fleischer's Inkwell Studios produced 19 sound cartoons, part of the Song Car-Tunes series, using the Phonofilm sound-on-film process. However, the Song Car-Tunes failed to keep the sound fully synchronized, whereas Steamboat Willie was produced using a click track to keep his musicians on the beat. Only one month before Steamboat Willie was released, Paul Terry's Fables Pictures released Dinner Time, which has a soundtrack but was not a financial success.

In June 1927, producer Pat Powers made an unsuccessful takeover bid for Lee de Forest's Phonofilm Corporation. In the aftermath, Powers hired a former DeForest technician, William Garrity, to produce a cloned version of the Phonofilm system, which Powers dubbed "Powers Cinephone". By then, de Forest was in too weak a financial position to mount a legal challenge against Powers for patent infringement. Powers convinced Disney to use Cinephone for Steamboat Willie.

== Plot ==
Steamboat Willie (1928)

Mickey Mouse is piloting a side-wheeler paddle steamer, cheerfully whistling "Steamboat Bill" and sounding the boat's three whistles. Soon, captain Pete appears and orders Mickey off of the bridge. Annoyed, Mickey blows a raspberry at Pete who attempts to kick him, but Mickey rushes away in time and Pete accidentally kicks himself in the rear. Mickey falls down the stairs, slips on a bar of soap on the boat's deck, and lands in a bucket of water. A parrot laughs at him for that's what he gets, and Mickey throws the bucket on his head in retaliation.

Pete has been watching the occurrence, and pilots the steamboat himself. He bites off some chewing tobacco and spits into the wind. The spit flies backward and rings the boat's bell. Amused, Pete spits again, but this time the spit hits him in the face, to his dismay.

The steamboat makes a stop at "Podunk Landing" to pick up a cargo of various livestock. Mickey has trouble getting one of the slimmer cows with a FOB tag onto the boat attached to a harness. To solve this, Mickey fills the cow's stomach up with hay to fatten the slim cow into the harness. Just as they set off again, Minnie Mouse appears, running to catch the boat before it leaves. Mickey does not see her in time, but is unaware that she runs after the boat along the shore calling out Mickey's name. Mickey hears Minnie's calls and he takes her on board by hooking the cargo crane to her bloomers.

Landing on the deck, Minnie accidentally drops a ukulele and sheet music for the song "Turkey in the Straw", which are eaten by a goat. After a brief tug of war with the goat over the partially eaten ukulele, Mickey loses his grip and lets it go to land inside the goat. The force from the ukulele makes the goat begin to play musical notes. Mickey is interested, and orders Minnie to begin using the goat's body as a phonograph by turning his tail like a crank. Music begins to play which delights the two mice. Mickey uses various objects on the boat as percussion accompaniment, and later on begins to "play" the animals like musical instruments via pulling the tail of a cat, stretching a goose's throat, tugging on the tails of a nursing sow's piglets and using the sow as an accordion, and using a cow's teeth and tongue as a xylophone to play the song.

Captain Pete is unamused by the musical act and puts Mickey to work peeling potatoes. Out of spite, Mickey uses a knife to peel the potatoes wastefully, discarding most of the potato along with the skin. In the potato bin, the same parrot that laughed at him earlier appears in the porthole and laughs at him again for that's what he gets. Fed up with the bird's heckling, Mickey throws a half-peeled potato at him, knocking him back into the river below. Mickey then laughs as he sits next to the potatoes and hears the parrot squawking.

=== Dialogue ===
Mickey, Minnie, and Pete perform in near-pantomime, with growls and squeaks but no intelligible dialogue. The only true dialogue in the film is spoken by the ship's parrot. When Mickey falls into a bucket of soapy water, the bird says, "Hope you don't feel hurt, big boy! Ha ha ha ha ha!". After Mickey throws the bucket onto the parrot's head, he cries "Help! Help! Man overboard!". He repeats the phase at the end of the short, after which Mickey throws a potato at the parrot and sends him falling into the water.

== Production ==
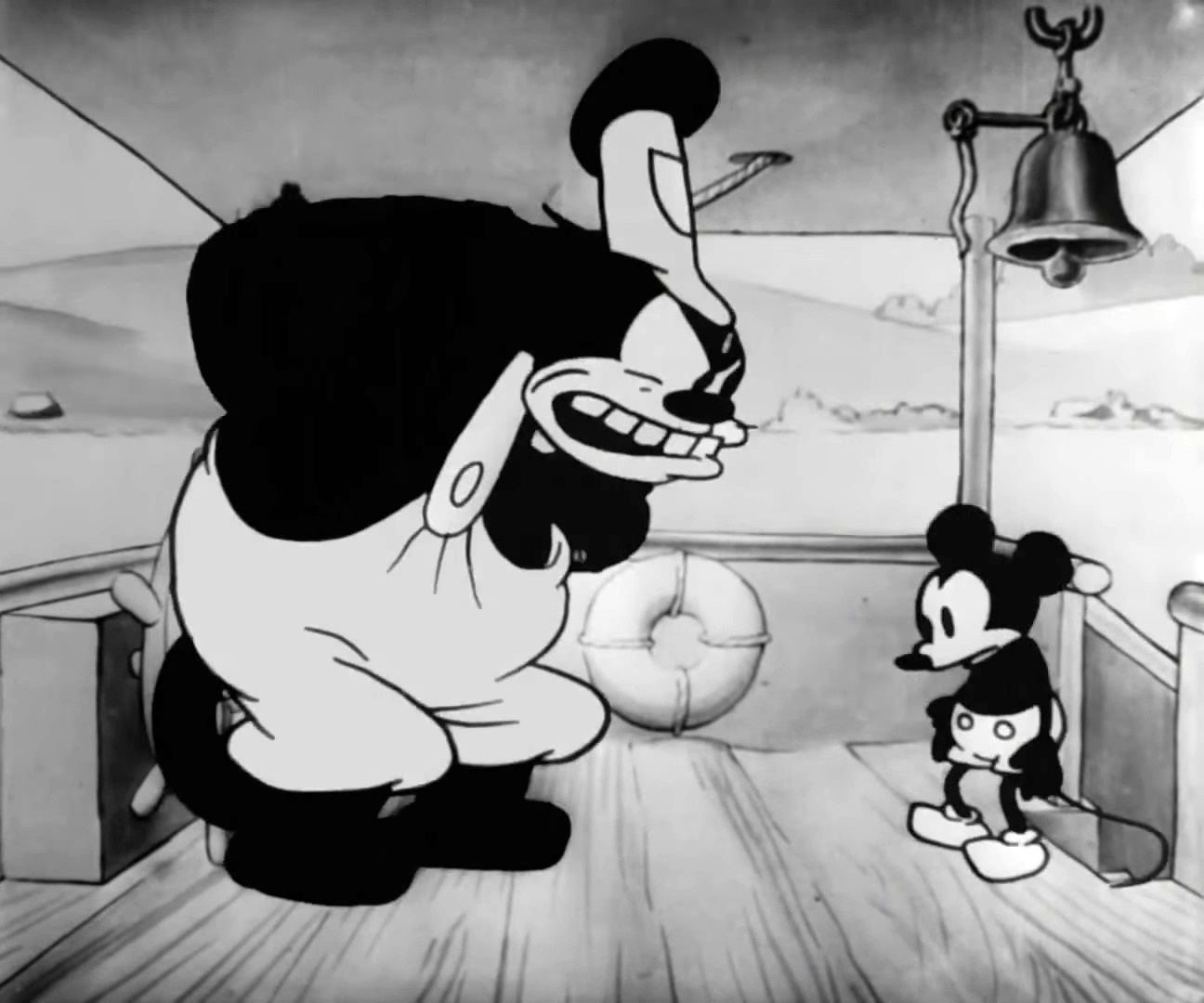
Pete confronts Mickey on the bridge of the steamboat at the beginning of the short film

Steamboat Willie was produced between July and September 1928, which according to Roy O. Disney's personal notes had a budget of US$4,986.69 (equivalent to about $94,000 in 2025), including the prints for movie theaters. There was initially some doubt among the animators that a sound cartoon would appear believable enough, so before a soundtrack was produced, Disney arranged for a screening of the film to a test audience with live sound to accompany it. This screening took place on July 29, with Steamboat Willie only partly finished. The audience sat in a room adjoining Walt Disney's office. Roy projected the film from outdoors and through a window, to hide the projector's mechanical sound. Ub Iwerks hung a bedsheet for a movie screen, behind which he placed a microphone connected to speakers where the audience would sit. The live sound was produced from behind the bedsheet. Wilfred Jackson played the music on a mouth organ, Ub Iwerks banged on pots and pans for the percussion segment, and Johnny Cannon provided sound effects with various devices, including slide whistles and spittoons for bells. Walt Disney provided the short's little dialogue, mostly grunts, laughs, and squawks. After several practices, they were ready for the performance for Disney employees and their wives.

The audience's response was extremely positive, and it gave Walt Disney the confidence to move forward and complete the film. He recalled this first viewing: "The effect on our little audience was nothing less than electric. They responded almost instinctively to this union of sound and motion. I thought they were kidding me. So they put me in the audience and ran the action again. It was terrible, but it was wonderful! And it was something new!" Iwerks said: "I've never been so thrilled in my life. Nothing since has ever equaled it."

Walt Disney traveled to New York City to hire a company to produce the soundtrack, since no such facilities existed in Los Angeles. He eventually settled on Pat Powers's Cinephone system, created by Powers using a bootlegged and updated version of Lee De Forest's Phonofilm system.

The music in the final soundtrack was performed by the Green Brothers Novelty Band and was conducted by Carl Edouarde. Joe and Lew Green from the band also assisted in timing the music to the film. The first attempt to synchronize the recording with the film, done on September 15, 1928, was a disaster. Disney had to sell his Moon roadster in order to finance a second recording. This was a success, with the addition of a filmed bouncing ball to keep the tempo.

== Release and reception ==
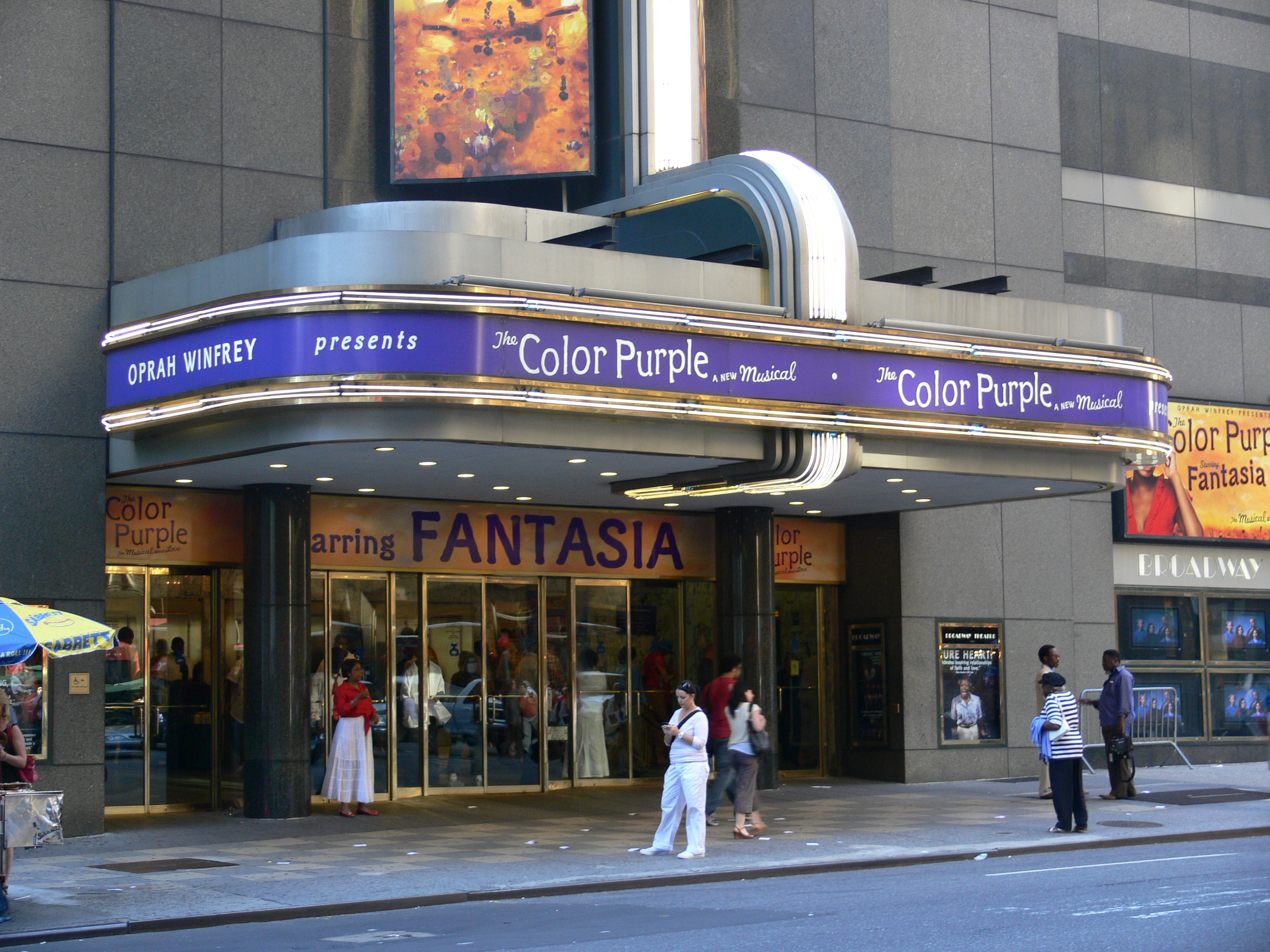
The Broadway Theatre in New York (2007) was known in 1928 as Universal's Colony Theatre, when it premiered Steamboat Willie.

Steamboat Willie premiered at Universal's Colony Theater in New York City on November 18, 1928. The film was distributed by Celebrity Productions, and its initial run was played five times daily for two weeks. Disney was paid $500 (equivalent to about $9,000 in 2025) per week. It played ahead of the independent feature film Gang War. Steamboat Willie was an immediate hit, but Gang War became a lost film.

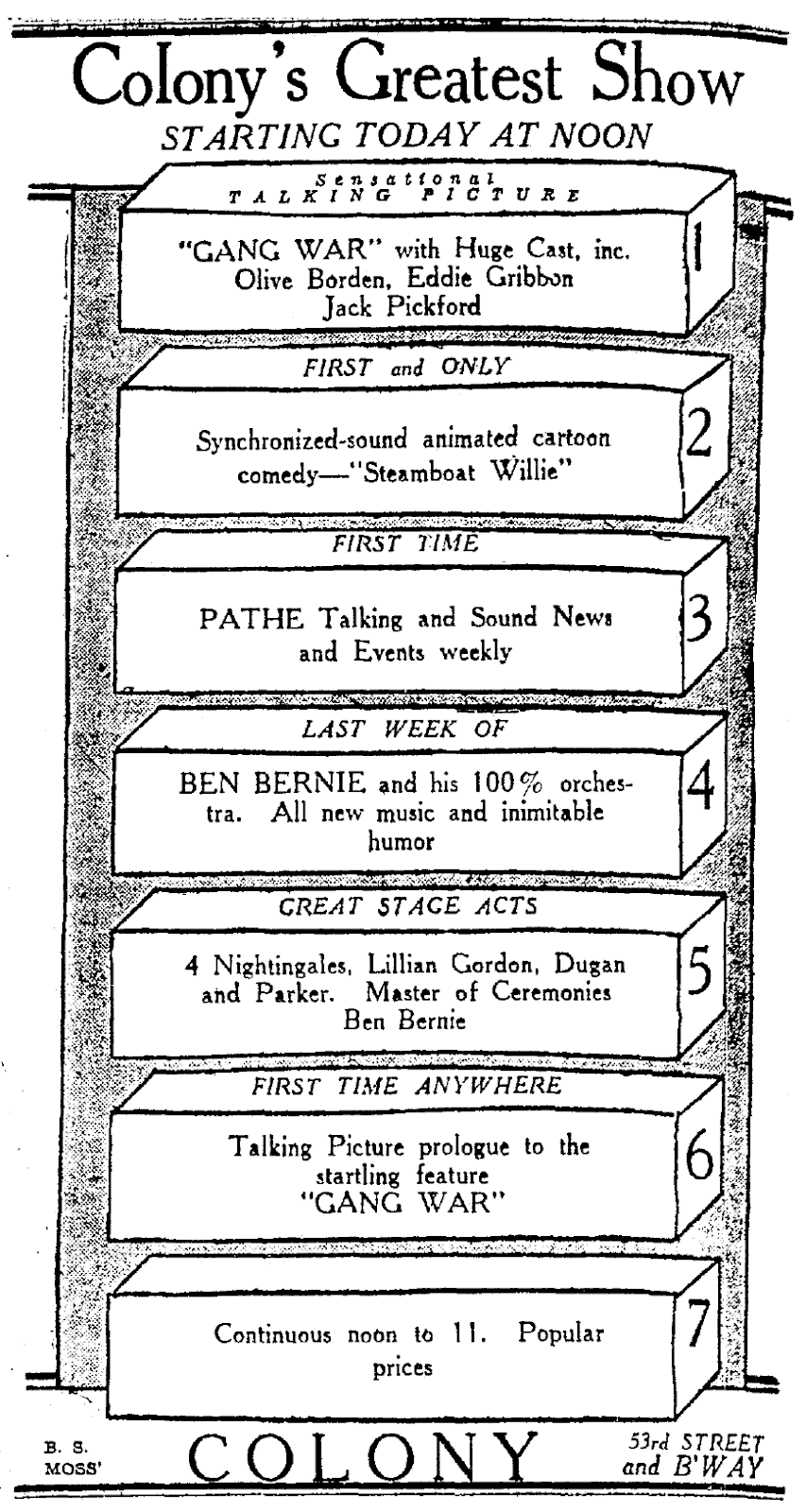
A Colony theater bill from November 18, 1928, promoted Steamboat Willie in the second row

The success of Steamboat Willie led to international fame for Walt Disney and Mickey Mouse.

Variety magazine's issue on November 21, 1928, said:

Not the first animated cartoon to be synchronized with sound effects, but the first to attract favorable attention. This one represents a high order of cartoon ingenuity, cleverly combined with sound effects. The union brought forth laughs galore. Giggles came so fast at the Colony [Theater] they were stumbling over each other. It's a peach of a synchronization job all the way, bright, snappy, and fit the situation perfectly. Cartoonist, Walter Disney. With most of the animated cartoons qualifying as a pain in the neck, it's a signal tribute to this particular one. If the same combination of talent can turn out a series as good as Steamboat Willie they should find a wide market if the interchangeability angle does not interfere. Recommended unreservedly for all wired houses.

The Film Daily on November 25, 1928, said:

This is what Steamboat Willie has: First, a clever and amusing treatment; secondly, music and sound effects added via the Cinephone method. The result is a real tidbit of diversion. The maximum has been gotten from the sound effects. Worthy of bookings in any house wired to reproduce sound-on-film. Incidentally, this is the first Cinephone-recorded subject to get a public exhibition and at the Colony [Theater], New York, is being shown over Western Electric equipment.

Columbia Pictures reissued the film after Walt Disney Productions switched distributors.

=== Legacy ===
In 1994, members of the animation field voted Steamboat Willie 13th in the book The 50 Greatest Cartoons, which listed the greatest cartoons of all time. In 1998, the short was selected for preservation in the United States National Film Registry by the Library of Congress as being deemed "culturally, historically, or aesthetically significant". The Australian Perth Mint released a 1 kilogram (2.2 lb) gold coin in honor of Steamboat Willie in 2015. In 2024, Time Out magazine ranked it as the best animated short film of all time.

In the 21st century, some have characterized the film as depicting animal cruelty.

== Copyright status ==
=== United States ===
The Walt Disney Animation Studios production logo since 2007 is based on an excerpt from Steamboat Willie.

Prior to its entrance into the public domain on January 1, 2024, the film had been the center of a variety of general controversies regarding copyright. Its copyright was extended multiple times by acts of the United States Congress. Since the copyright was filed in 1928, three days after its initial release, it was repeatedly extended for nearly a century.

Steamboat Willie could have entered the public domain in four different years: first in 1955, at which point it was renewed to 1986, then extended to 2003 by the Copyright Act of 1976, and finally to 2023 by the Copyright Term Extension Act of 1998 (also known pejoratively as the "Mickey Mouse Protection Act"). It has been claimed that these extensions were a response by Congress to extensive lobbying by The Walt Disney Company.

In the 1990s, former Disney researcher Gregory S. Brown determined that the film was likely in the U.S. public domain already due to errors in the original copyright formulation. In particular, the original film's copyright notice had two additional names between Disney and the copyright statement. Thus, under the rules of the Copyright Act of 1909, all copyright claims would be null. Arizona State University professor Dennis Karjala suggested that one of his law school students look into Brown's claim as a class project. Lauren Vanpelt took up the challenge and produced a paper agreeing with Brown's claim. She posted her project on the Internet in 1999. Disney later threatened to sue a Georgetown University law student who wrote a paper confirming Brown's claims, alleging that publishing the paper could be slander of title, but Disney chose not to sue after its publication.

Beginning in 2022, several Republican lawmakers vowed to oppose any future attempt to extend the copyright term due to Disney's opposition of the Florida Parental Rights in Education Act. Legal experts noted that later versions of Mickey Mouse created after Steamboat Willie will remain copyrighted, and Disney's use of the Steamboat Willie version as a logo in its films since 2007 may allow the company to claim protection for the 1928 version under trademark law, because active trademarks can be renewed in perpetuity if the owner can prove ongoing usage.

In April 2023, John Oliver announced his intention to use the Steamboat Willie version of Mickey Mouse as the new mascot for Last Week Tonight with John Oliver as soon as the cartoon entered the public domain in 2024, and debuted the "brand new character".

Not affecting trademark status, Steamboat Willie entered the U.S. public domain on January 1, 2024, more than 95 years after its release.

Although it was believed that only the black-and-white depiction of Mickey Mouse (lacking the red shorts and gloves) would enter the public domain, it has been pointed out that a promotional poster created in 1928 features Mickey Mouse wearing red shorts and yellow gloves, meaning those attributes might also have entered the public domain. However, though the poster was created in 1928, it is unclear whether it was published that year; thus, its copyright status is unknown, and Mickey Mouse's red shorts and yellow gloves are not definitively in the public domain (whether such details reach a threshold of originality is another unresolved issue).

=== Japan ===
The copyright status of Steamboat Willie has been more complicated in Japan. Many people believed that the copyright expired in May 1989, based on the regular copyright term of 50 years after publication plus the wartime extension of 10 years and 5 months. In 2003, Japan extended the copyright length for films to 70 years, but it did not revive already expired copyrights. However, films released before 1971 remain under copyright until 38 years after the director dies if it is longer than 70 years after publication. Ub Iwerks, the last surviving director, died in 1971, and counting from 38 years after his death plus the wartime extension, Mickey Mouse entered the public domain in Japan in May 2020. Still, some people alleged that Mickey Mouse would remain protected until 2052 due to the complex nature of the protection for films.

However, according to the Copyright Act of Japan, once the cinematographic work's copyright expires, the original work also loses copyright protection, and the protection for the author's life plus 70 years does not apply to anonymous, corporate or cinematographic works, so it is most likely that the film entered the public domain in May 2020.

== In other media ==
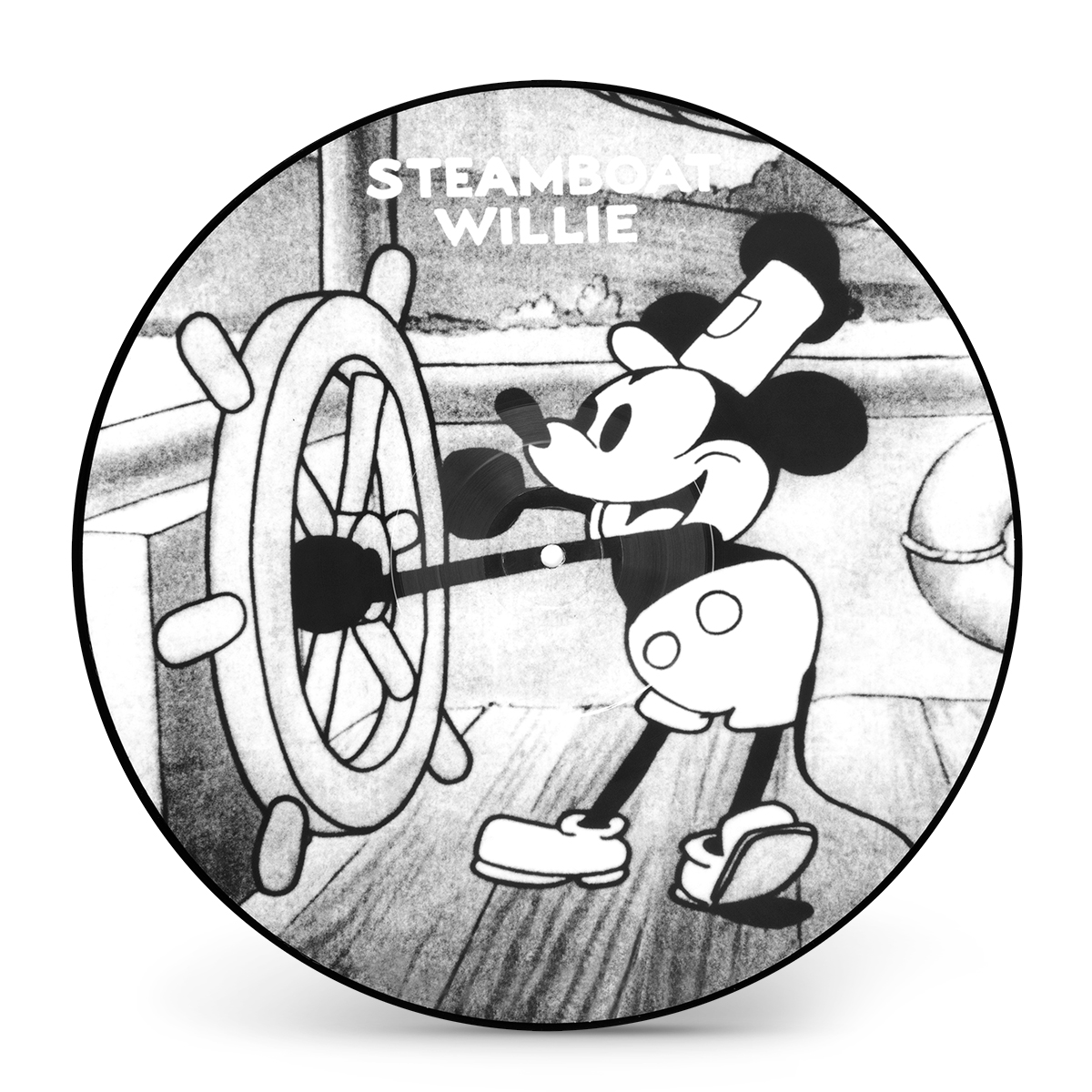
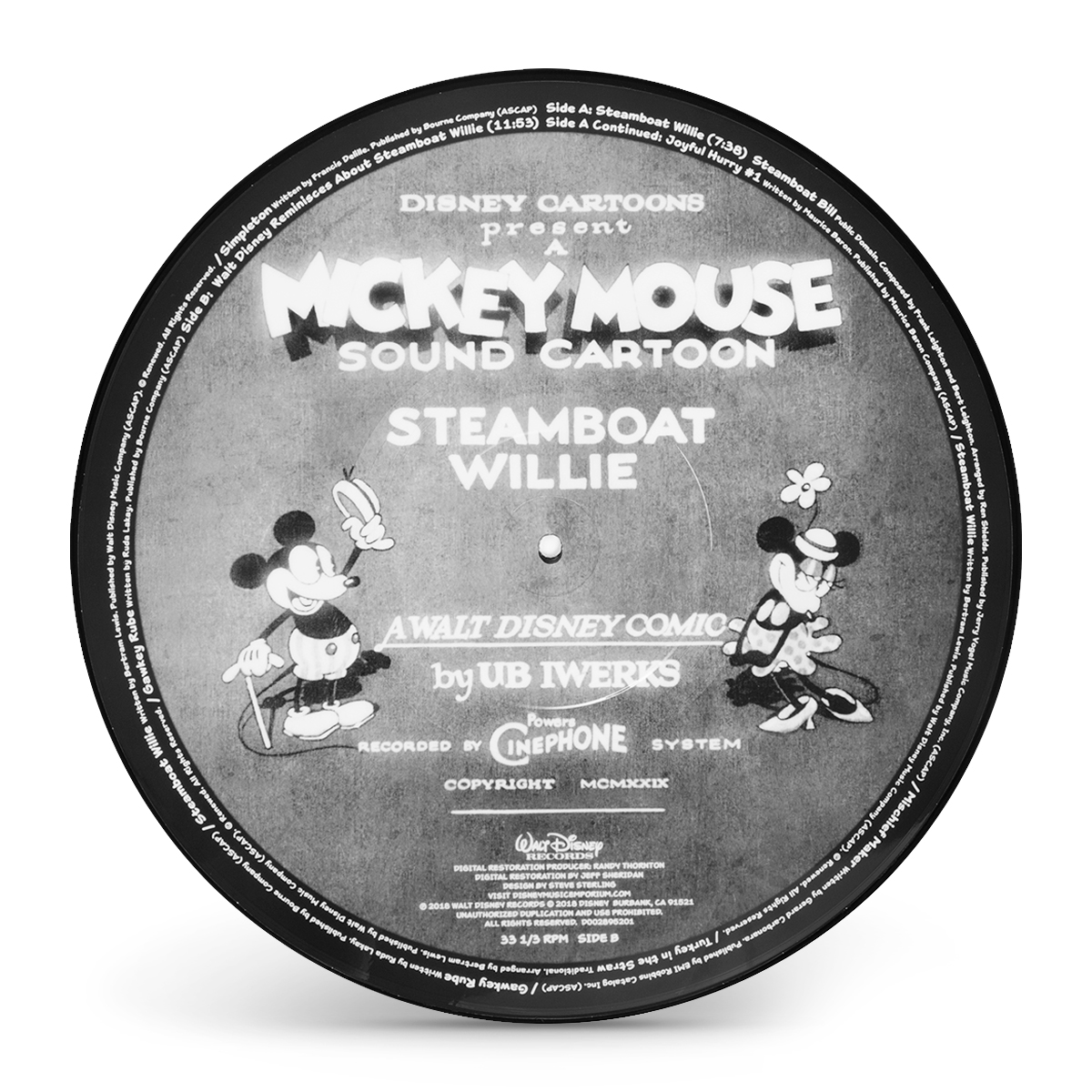
Disney Music Group released a vinyl record with the music score of "Steamboat Willie" in 2018.

=== Television and film ===
The fourth-season 1992 episode of The Simpsons "Itchy & Scratchy: The Movie" features a short parody of the opening scene of Steamboat Willie, titled Steamboat Itchy.

In the 1998 film Saving Private Ryan, set in 1944, a German prisoner of war, nicknamed "Steamboat Willie", tries to win the sympathy of his American captors by talking about Mickey Mouse.

In the 2008 film spinoff The Beast with a Billion Backs from the TV series Futurama, the opening is a parody of Steamboat Willie.

As part of its 100-year anniversary, in July 2023, Disney released a The Wonderful World of Mickey Mouse special and series finale titled Steamboat Silly featuring multiple copies of vintage Mickey.

The first cinematic adaptation of Steamboat Willie since its entry to public domain is the live-action art film Social Imagineering by multidisciplinary artist Sweætshops released at midnight on January 1, 2024, which was filmed on the PS Waverley paddle steamer.

=== Video games ===
Steamboat Willie–themed levels are featured in the video games Mickey Mania (1994), Kingdom Hearts II (2005), and Epic Mickey (2010). An alternate Steamboat Willie-themed costume of Kingdom Hearts' Sora is featured in Super Smash Bros. Ultimate (2018). The Steamboat Willie versions of Mickey Mouse and Pete are featured as playable racers in Disney Speedstorm (2023).

=== Other use by Disney ===
In 1993, to coincide with the opening of Mickey's Toontown in Disneyland, a shortened cover of the cartoon's music was arranged to be featured in the land's background ambiance.

In 2007, a Steamboat Willie clip of Mickey whistling started being used in the production logo of Walt Disney Animation Studios.

In 2019, Lego Ideas released an official Steamboat Willie set to commemorate the 90th anniversary of Mickey Mouse.

The whistle in the film has been used to make sound, and the ship's wheel is a prop, in the Mickey & Minnie's Runaway Railway attraction, which opened at Disneyland in January 2023.

=== Works based on Steamboat Willie ===
Following the cartoon entering the public domain, several unofficial media were announced, including survival horror game Infestation: Origins. The Mouse Trap (2024) is a slasher film where a mass murderer in a Mickey Mouse mask hunts down a group of teenagers inside an amusement arcade, and Screamboat (2025) is a comedy horror film where Mickey Mouse turns into a mutated creature that starts a murderous rampage on a ferry. Screamboat was directed by Steven LaMorte, who previously worked on the 2022 Grinch slasher film The Mean One. Media compared both films to Winnie-the-Pooh: Blood and Honey which was enabled by Winnie-the-Pooh entering the public domain the previous year.

After Disney declined to acknowledge whether the company would pursue litigation regarding a planned advertisement by law firm Morgan & Morgan based on the film, the law firm sued Disney in September 2025 in the US Florida Middle District Court. Two months later, Morgan & Morgan dropped their lawsuit.

== Release history ==
=== Theatrical ===
- July 1928 – first sound test screening (silent with live sound)
- September 1928 – first attempt to synchronize the recording on the film
- November 1928 – original theatrical release with final soundtrack
- 1972 – The Mouse Factory, episode #33: "Tugboats" (TV)
- 1990s – Mickey's Mouse Tracks, episode #45 (TV)
- 1996 – Mickey's Greatest Hits
- 1997 – Ink & Paint Club, episode #2 "Mickey Landmarks" (TV)
- Ongoing – Main Street Cinema at Disneyland

=== Cuts ===
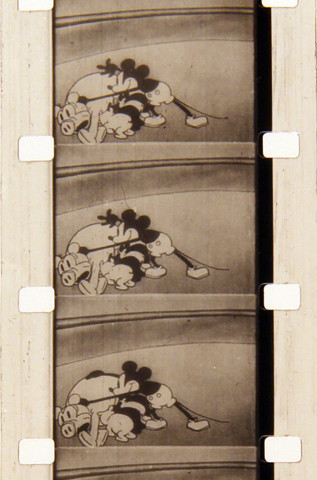
This segment of film was cut from a Steamboat Willie reel by a 1930s cinema.

In the 1950s, Disney removed a scene in which Mickey tugs on the tails of the baby pigs, and then picks up the mother and kicks them off her teats, and plays her like an accordion, because television distributors deemed it inappropriate. A variant of this censored version is featured on the 1998 VHS/Laserdisc compilation special The Spirit of Mickey, where the first part of the scene with Mickey pulling on the piglets' tails is reinstated. Since then, the full version of the film was included on the Walt Disney Treasures DVD set "Mickey Mouse in Black and White", and on Disney+ and the Disney website.

=== Home media ===
- 1984 – Cartoon Classics: Limited Gold Editions: Mickey (VHS)
- 1998 – The Spirit of Mickey (VHS/Laserdisc)
- 2001 – The Hand Behind the Mouse: The Ub Iwerks Story (VHS)
- 2002 – Walt Disney Treasures: Mickey Mouse in Black and White
- 2005 – Vintage Mickey (DVD)
- 2007 – Walt Disney Treasures: The Adventures of Oswald the Lucky Rabbit
- 2009 – Snow White and the Seven Dwarfs (Blu-ray)
- 2018 – Celebrating Mickey 90th-anniversary compilation (Blu-ray/DVD/Digital)
  - Celebrating Mickey was reissued in 2021 as part of the U.S. Disney Movie Club exclusive The Best of Mickey Collection along with Fantasia and Fantasia 2000 (Blu-ray/DVD/Digital).
- 2019 – Disney+ (streaming online)
- 2023 – Mickey & Minnie: 10 Classic Shorts – Volume 1 95th-anniversary compilation (Blu-ray/DVD/Digital)

== See also ==
- History of animation
- 2024 in public domain
- Mickey Mouse (film series)
