= Some Lonesome Night =

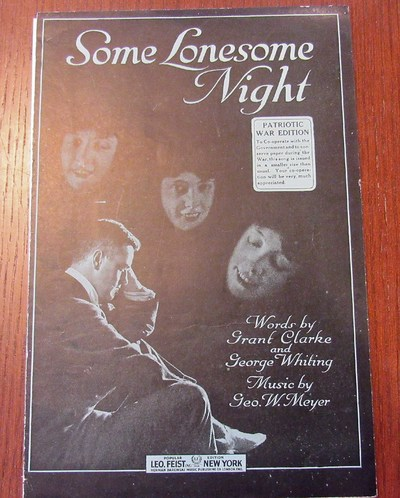
- Sheet music cover

Song
- Published: 1918
- Songwriter(s): Composer: George W. Meyer; Lyricist: Grant Clarke and George Whiting

Some Lonesome Night is a song by George W. Meyer with lyrics by Grant Clarke and George Whiting. It was published in 1918 by Leo Feist Inc.
