= Homeward Bound (1917 song) =

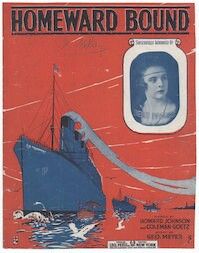

Song by Rosenbaum Studios
- Published: 1917
- Composer(s): George W. Meyer
- Lyricist(s): Howard Johnson and Coleman Goetz
- Producer(s): Leo. Feist, Inc.

Homeward Bound is a World War I era song that says the war will soon be over, and the soldiers will be able to return home. It has a hopeful message and was meant to comfort both soldiers and the family and friends of soldiers. It was composed by George W. Meyer, written by Howard Johnson and Coleman Goetz, and produced by Leo. Feist, Inc. in 1917.

== Lyrics ==
Somewhere far away, Somewhere in the fray, Many boys are over the sea, Fighting for you, fighting for me. They're all proud to carry a gun. Their work will soon be done.

CHORUS "Homeward Bound" Someday they'll hear that welcome sound, For while the shot and the shell are flying, For the ones at home they're sighing: And tho' the skies seem grey, There's bound to be a brighter day, For when the dove of peace flies over the land, They all will hear the general give the command, "We are "Homeward Bound'." That's a wonderful, wonderful sound.

When the moon looks down On the battleground, By the campfires' flickering gleams, They think of home in all their dreams. Of the future naught can they learn. Let's pray for their return.

REPEAT CHORUS

AD LIB: RECITATION: "Homeward Bound" There's so much meaning in the sound. To all those faithful one, those noble sons, upon the battleground, For tho' their minds are on their duty And the fight that must be won, There are times they can't help but wishing, That their mighty tasks were done. Even tho' you're not a soldier, tho' you're not across the sea, There is something in these words that takes you back to mother's knee So let's keep the home fires burning, with the hope in every heart, That they'll soon will be returning to us, nevermore to part.
