= Joy Eden Harrison =

American singer-songwriter

- Born: September 4, 1962 (age 63)
- Occupations: Singer, songwriter, musician
- Website: joyedenharrison.com

Joy Eden Harrison (born September 4, 1962) is an American singer, songwriter, and musician. She has released three critically acclaimed CDs, the late 1990s Angel Town, the 2002 Unspoken, and 2006's Blue Venus. She won Best Jazz Artist in the 2002 Independent Music Awards for Unspoken, selected by judges Tom Waits, Arturo Sandoval and Don Byron.

Harrison has had two of her songs featured in Hollywood films. The Love Beneath Your Lies is in the film Curtain Call. Marlene is in the film Suicide Kings.

Harrison claims that her lyrical complexity reflects a link to her great-aunt, novelist Anzia Yezierska, and that her musical gifts and connection to the jazz era come from her great-uncle Milton Ager, the composer of Happy Days Are Here Again.
