= Tom, Dick and Harry and Jack (Hurry Back) =

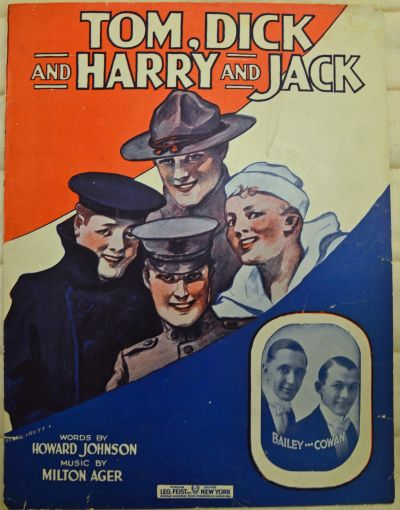

Song
- Released: 1917
- Length: 2:13
- Composer(s): Milton Ager
- Lyricist(s): Howard Johnson

"Tom, Dick and Harry and Jack (Hurry Back)" is a World War I era song released in 1917. Howard Johnson wrote the lyrics. Milton Ager composed the music. The song was published by Leo Feist, Inc. of New York City. Artist Henry Hutt designed the sheet music cover. It features four men in different service uniforms with an inset photo of either Jack Connors, Jr. or Bailey and Cowan. The inset photo varies by edition. It was written for both voice and piano.

In 1918, The Peerless Quartet recorded the song. It was released by Victor Records. In that same year, vocalist Arthur Fields also recorded the song. It was released under the Columbia Records label.

The sheet music can be found at Pritzker Military Museum & Library.

== Text ==
The song is about the people waiting at home for the servicemen fighting overseas. Although they are proud of their boys, the "sweethearts and mothers" are anxious to have them back. The chorus is their nightly prayer:

Tom, Dick and Harry and Jack
Hurry back, hurry back
Be quick, do the trick, get it over
Then don't even stop to pack
The tears that we've shed make an ocean
Home without you seems just like an empty shack
So Tom, Dick and Harry and Jack
Hurry back! Hurry back! Hurry back!
