= Bring Back My Daddy to Me =

"Bring Back My Daddy To Me"
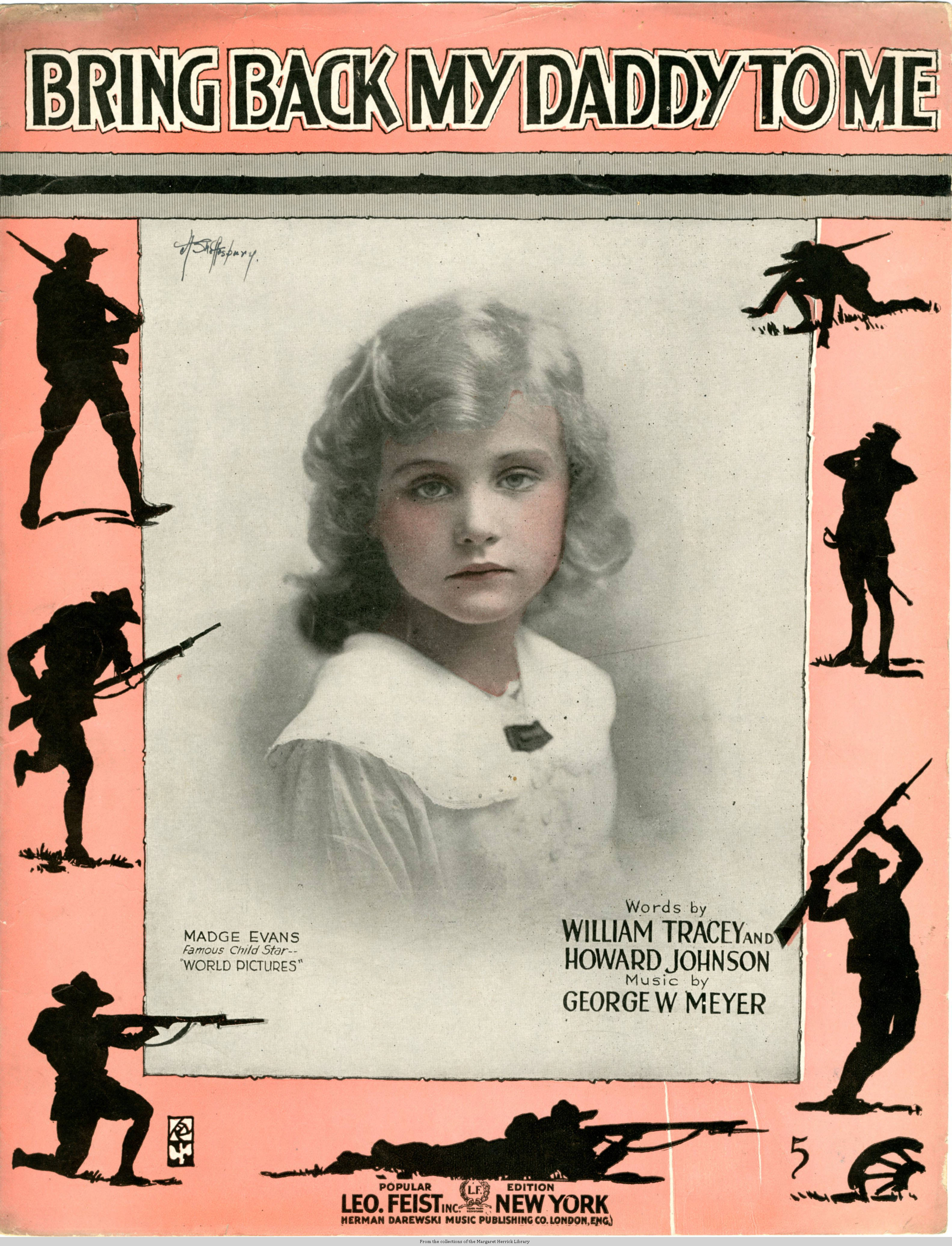

Song
- Released: 1917
- Composer(s): George W. Meyer
- Lyricist(s): William Tracey, Howard Johnson

"Bring Back My Daddy To Me" is a World War I era song released in 1917. William Tracey and Howard Johnson wrote the lyrics. George W. Meyer composed the music. Leo Feist, Inc. of New York, New York published the song.

== Sheet music ==
The sheet music cover was designed by Rosenbaum Studios. It features child star Madge Evans in the center. Surrounding her image are silhouettes of soldiers in various fighting positions. Evans would go on to become one of the leading actresses of her time, starring in films such as, Dinner at Eight (1933), David Copperfield (1935), Pennies from Heaven (1936). She performed, "Bring Back My Daddy To Me."

The sheet music can be found at Pritzker Military Museum & Library.

== Analysis ==
The song was written for both voice and piano. It is a waltz. The song was also published for band, orchestra, and male quartet. It sold well, which may be attributed to the fact that a high number of children were losing their fathers in the war. The story of the song was relatable to many.

The song begins with a young girl playing with her toys. Her birthday is approaching, and her mother asks her what she'd like as a present. The girl replies that all she wants is her father back. The mother begins to cry, and says, "There are more little girls/In this grief-stricken world,/All saying the same thing tonight:" The chorus is as follows:

"I don't want a dress or a dolly,
'Cause dollies get broken 'round here.
I don't want the skates,
The books or the slates
You bought for my birthday last year.
If you'll bring the present I ask for,
Dear mother, how happy I'll be;
You can give all my toys
To some poor girls and boys,
But bring back my daddy to me!

== Recordings ==
It was recorded both by Robert Lewis and Harry McClaskey.
