= Let's All Be Americans Now =

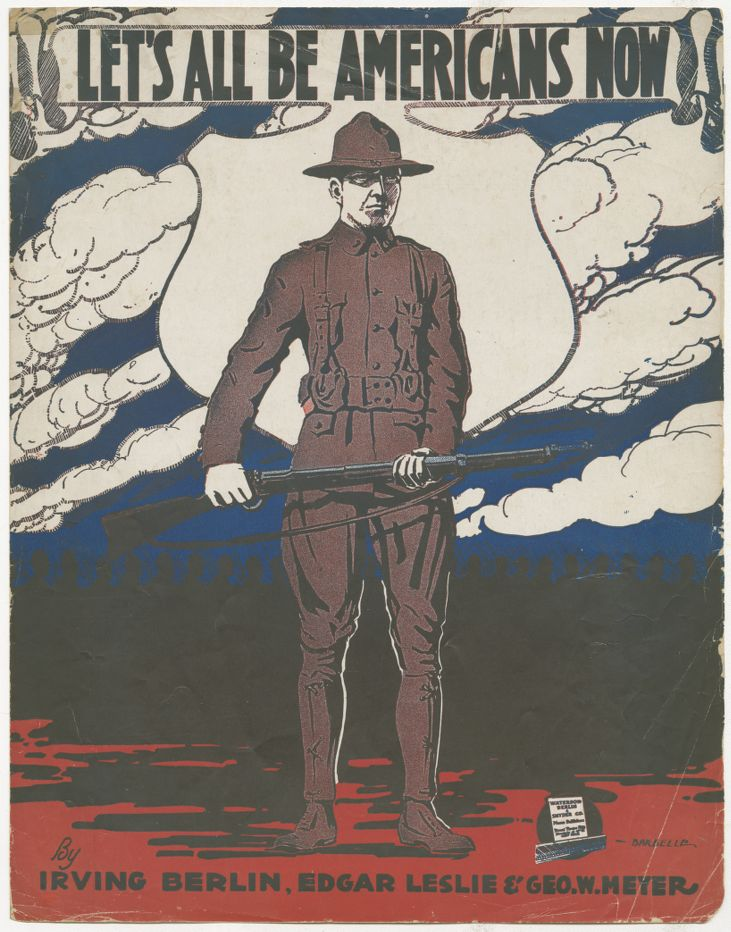
- Sheet music cover, 1917

Song
- Language: English
- Published: 1917
- Songwriter(s): Irving Berlin, Edgar Leslie, and George W. Meyer

Let's All Be Americans Now is a World War I song written and composed by Irving Berlin, Edgar Leslie, and George W. Meyer. The song was first published in 1917 by Waterson, Berlin & Snyder Co., in New York, NY, appearing in the Broadway musical, 'Dance and Grow Thin'. The sheet music cover depicts a soldier with his rifle and silhouetted marching soldiers in the background. A popular recording in 1917 was made by the American Quartet.

The sheet music can be found at the Pritzker Military Museum & Library.

== Bibliography ==
- Parker, Bernard S. World War I Sheet Music 1. Jefferson: McFarland & Company, Inc., 2007. ISBN 978-0-7864-2798-7. OCLC 71790113
- Paas, John Roger. 2014. America sings of war: American sheet music from World War I. ISBN 9783447102780. OCLC 892462420
- Vogel, Frederick G. World War I Songs: A History and Dictionary of Popular American Patriotic Tunes, with Over 300 Complete Lyrics. Jefferson: McFarland & Company, Inc., 1995. ISBN 0-89950-952-5. OCLC 32241433
