= Itchy & Scratchy: The Movie =

- The Simpsons episode
- Episode no.: Season 4 Episode 6
- Directed by: Rich Moore
- Written by: John Swartzwelder
- Production code: 9F03
- Original air date: November 3, 1992

Episode features
- Chalkboard gag: (first) Bart writes "I will not bury the new kid"/(second) Marge writes "I will try to raise a better child"
- Couch gag: The couch deflates after the family sits on it.
- Commentary: Matt Groening; Al Jean; Mike Reiss; Rich Moore

Episode chronology
← Previous "Treehouse of Horror III"	Next → "Marge Gets a Job"
- The Simpsons season 4

"Itchy & Scratchy: The Movie" is the sixth episode of the fourth season of the American animated television series The Simpsons. It originally aired on Fox in the United States on November 3, 1992. The plot follows Bart continually getting in trouble, and how Homer is unable to give him any suitable punishment. Marge gets Homer to agree to make a punishment stick, and he forbids Bart to see the new Itchy & Scratchy movie for not watching Maggie.

The episode was written by John Swartzwelder and directed by Rich Moore.

== Plot ==
Marge and Homer attend a parent-teacher conference at Springfield Elementary School. Although Miss Hoover tells Homer that Lisa is doing well, Mrs. Krabappel tells Marge that Bart is continually causing trouble. She urges Homer and Marge to enforce stronger discipline and suggests that Bart could grow up to become a Supreme Court Justice if his behavior improves. Marge and Homer return home to find that Bart has stolen and broken Grampa's dentures. As punishment, Marge sends Bart to bed without dinner; however, Homer later brings Bart a slice of pizza and makes Bart promise to behave. However, Bart continues to get in trouble, always managing to distract Homer from punishing him. Eventually, Homer vows to give Bart an effective penalty.

Bart buys himself a ticket for Itchy & Scratchy: The Movie, the highly anticipated film adaptation of The Itchy & Scratchy Show. While Bart is left home alone with Maggie, he watches television instead of paying attention to her. Maggie takes Homer's car for a joyride and crashes into the wall of Springfield Prison, releasing the prisoners. Homer then punishes Bart by tearing up Bart's ticket to Itchy & Scratchy: The Movie and banning him from ever seeing the movie under any circumstances. Bart begs for a different punishment, but Homer refuses. The film is released to wide acclaim, and every child in Springfield sees the film multiple times; since Bart is not allowed to see the film, his classmates shun him.

Bart tries to buy another ticket, but discovers Homer has instructed the movie theatre employees not to sell him a ticket. Two months after the film's release, Marge and Lisa try to convince Homer to change his mind, with Marge claiming Bart has been punished long enough, but Homer refuses. Eventually, after a run of eight months and sweeping the Academy Awards, the film is removed from theatres. Bart reluctantly confesses that the punishment deeply affected him, to which Homer responds that consequently, he will learn to accept responsibility for his actions and will have a better life as a result.

Forty years later, Bart, now Chief Justice of the United States, and Homer, a senior citizen, walk down the street and discover the film is back in the local theater as a classic re-release. Homer decides that Bart has officially learned from the experience, and the two happily watch the movie together.

== Production ==
This episode, like many other Itchy & Scratchy–themed episodes, was written by John Swartzwelder, although the plot was originally pitched by Sam Simon. During the table read of the script, the first act received many laughs, but the second act got little positive reaction, leading Al Jean to believe that the script would require a huge rewrite, although the third act also received a positive reaction. For The Itchy & Scratchy Movie shown at the end of the episode, Mike Reiss felt that it should top all other Itchy & Scratchy cartoons in terms of violence, and John Swartzwelder wrote the "most disturbing, horrible sequence", none of which was used in the final cut.

This was the first episode that Rich Moore directed at Film Roman. The shot of the Korean animation studio angered the Korean animators at Rough Draft Korea; Gregg Vanzo, the overseas director, felt insulted and nearly sent the scene back. While drawing the Steamboat Itchy sequence, the animators jokingly referred to it as "Steamboat Lawsuit". David Silverman explained that he did not know "why [they] weren't sued because there's a shot right out of Steamboat Willie in [the episode]."

The episode features the first appearance of Bumblebee Man, who is a caricature of "El Chapulín Colorado" ("The Red Grasshopper"), a character created and portrayed by Mexican television comedian Roberto Gómez Bolaños.

== Cultural references ==
The Itchy & Scratchy short Steamboat Itchy, parodies Steamboat Willie.

The opening Star Trek film is a parody of how old the crew of the original Star Trek cast looked in the later movies. Khachaturian's "Sabre Dance" plays while Bart runs amok. Mrs. Krabappel says that "even the poorest student can become Chief Justice of the Supreme Court." Homer muses that Bart could join "John Marshall, Charles Evans Hughes, Warren Burger..." His apparent familiarity with Supreme Court Justices became a running gag. The 1929 Itchy & Scratchy short Steamboat Itchy is a spoof of the 1928 Disney short Steamboat Willie, the debut of Mickey Mouse. Lisa says Dustin Hoffman and Michael Jackson make cameos in Itchy & Scratchy: The Movie, adding "They didn't use their real names, but you could tell it was them." Hoffman and Jackson had made cameos on The Simpsons using pseudonyms in "Lisa's Substitute" and "Stark Raving Dad", respectively. In flashback, Homer is seen listening to "Yummy Yummy Yummy" by The Ohio Express instead of watching the Moon landing. In the flash forward sequence, a man is purchasing Soylent Green in the lobby of the theater. A vehicle resembling a landspeeder from Star Wars (1977) is also shown. The marquee says Itchy & Scratchy: The Movie has been re-released on a bill with Beauty and the Beast (1991). Homer and Bart are seen silhouetted against the screen, a reference to Mystery Science Theater 3000.

Homer tries to take credit for Lisa's success, saying he read to her from TV Guide and emphasized the "three R's": “Reading TV Guide, writing to TV Guide, and renewing TV Guide!" The scene of a billboard for Itchy & Scratchy: The Movie splattering a bride with blood recalls the end of Carrie. Marge asks Homer, "Do you want your son to be Chief Justice of the Supreme Court, or a sleazy male stripper?" Homer responds: "Can't he both, like the late Earl Warren?" Marge points out that Warren wasn't a stripper, and Homer asks "Now who's being naive?" Lisa says Bart has "the demented melancholia of a Tennessee Williams heroine." Bart can be seen reading Itchy & Scratchy: The Movie: The Novel by Norman Mailer.

== Reception ==
During the fourth season, The Simpsons usually aired on a Thursday, but "Itchy & Scratchy: The Movie" aired on a Tuesday because the executives at Fox had wanted to air an episode during the 1992 presidential election results because they felt it would mean increased ratings. Instead, the episode dropped from its normal audience. "Itchy & Scratchy: The Movie" finished 25th in ratings for the week of November 2–8, 1992, with a Nielsen rating of 12.5, equivalent to approximately 11.6 million viewing households. It was the third highest-rated show on the Fox network that week, following The Simpsons episode "Marge Gets a Job", which aired in the same week on the usual Thursday, and Beverly Hills, 90210.

In the spring of 2002, the episode was released in the United Kingdom on a DVD collection titled The Simpsons Film Festival, along with the season eleven episode "Beyond Blunderdome", the season seven episode "22 Short Films About Springfield", and the season six episode "A Star Is Burns".

Gary Russell and Gareth Roberts, the authors of the book I Can't Believe It's a Bigger and Better Updated Unofficial Simpsons Guide called it a "superb episode", especially "[Homer]'s suggestion for punishing Bart's misbehaviour is to give him a present, and his trick for avoiding jury duty is 'to say you're prejudiced against all races.'"

"Steamboat Itchy" is one of Matt Groening's favorite moments in the history of the show. Nathan Ditum of Total Film ranked "Steamboat Itchy" as the show's 46th best film parody. In 2014, The Simpsons writers picked "Steamboat Itchy" from this episode as one of their nine favorite "Itchy & Scratchy" episodes of all time.

Nathan Rabin writes that "Itchy & Scratchy: The Movie" "isn’t just funny and sweet: It’s also the definitive parody of event-movie mania, though it’s as much a loving tribute to the hubbub and frenzy surrounding a truly epic event movie as it is a spoof", likening the release of the movie within the episode to the release of The Simpsons Movie fifteen years later.
