= He May Be Old, But He's Got Young Ideas =

"He May Be Old, But He's Got Young Ideas" was a popular song, originally published in 1916. It was written by Howard Johnson, Alex Gerber and Harry Jentes. It was published as sheet music and was recorded by several popular singers. Today, the most famous version is a 1916 version by Billy Murray, whose version has entered the public domain.

== Billy Murray Version ==
The Billy Murray version was released by Victor Records in 1916, and there appear to be two different versions of it, one known as the "rare" version. Both versions can be found on various websites such as the internet archive.

== See also ==
- Popular music
