= If He Can Fight Like He Can Love, Good Night Germany! =

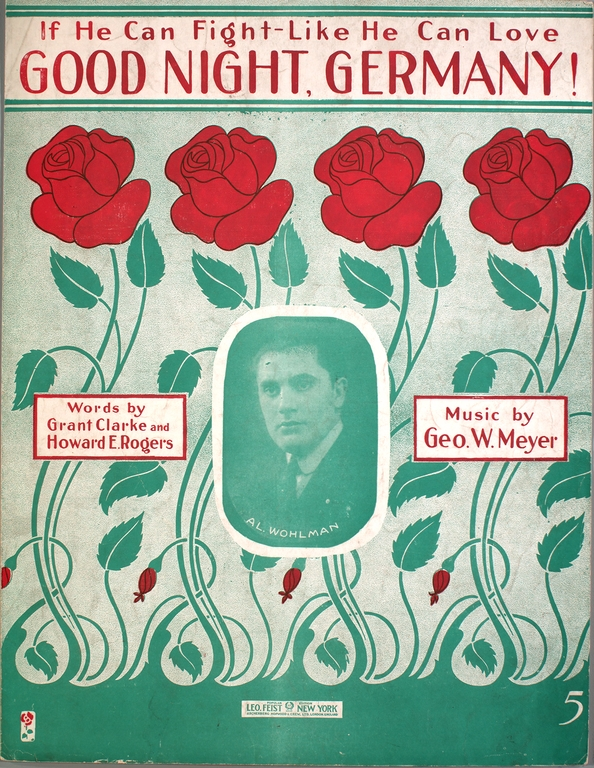

Song
- Published: 1918
- Composer: George W. Meyer
- Lyricists: Grant Clarke, Howard E. Rogers

"If He Can Fight Like He Can Love, Good Night Germany!" is a World War I song from the perspective of a woman confident that her boyfriend will be a good soldier because he was a good lover. It became a hit after it was released by The Farber Sisters in 1918.

The lyrics and cover art are in the public domain.

== Composition ==
The song was composed by George W. Meyer, with words by Grant Clarke and Howard E. Rogers. It was published by Leo Feist Inc in New York City in 1918.

== Performances ==
A top 20 song in 1918, the sheet music was repeatedly offered in a war edition with insets of the following performers Emma Carus, Flora Starr, Grace Wallace, and Rae Samuels.
