= The Gallopin' Gaucho =

1928 film by Ub Iwerks

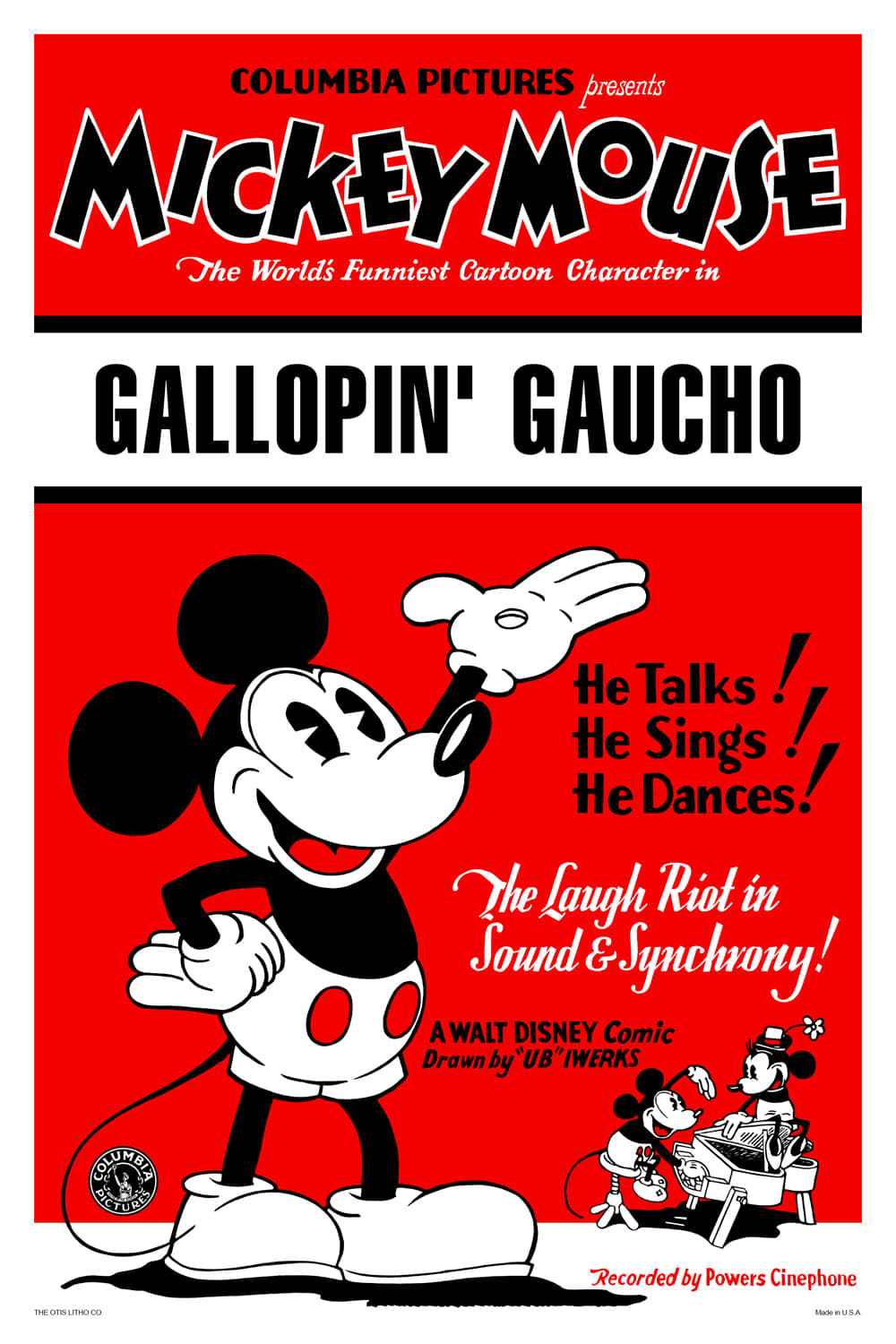
- Poster of 1929 reissue by Columbia Pictures
- Directed by: Ub Iwerks
- Produced by: Walt Disney
- Starring: Walt Disney
- Music by: Carl Stalling
- Animation by: Ub Iwerks
- Color process: Black and white Computer colorized (TV)
- Production company: Disney Cartoons
- Distributed by: Celebrity Productions
- Release date: December 30, 1928
- Running time: 6 minutes
- Country: United States
- Language: English

The Gallopin' Gaucho is a 1928 American animated short film directed by Ub Iwerks. It is the second short film featuring Mickey Mouse to be produced, following Plane Crazy and preceding Steamboat Willie. The Disney studios completed the silent version in August 1928, but did not release it in order to work on Steamboat Willie. The Gallopin' Gaucho was released, with sound, after Steamboat Willie on December 30, 1928 by Celebrity Productions. Columbia Pictures reissued the film after Walt Disney Productions switched distributors.

The short entered the US public domain on January 1, 2024. (Note: Some reporting has cited the short, or alternatively only the sound version, as entering the public domain on January 1, 2025, due to the copyright date on the title card of the sound version. The sound version of the short was released on December 30, 1928, per The Walt Disney Archives via D23, meaning regardless of the copyright year in the title card, both versions entered the public domain on January 1, 2024.)

== Plot ==
The full short.

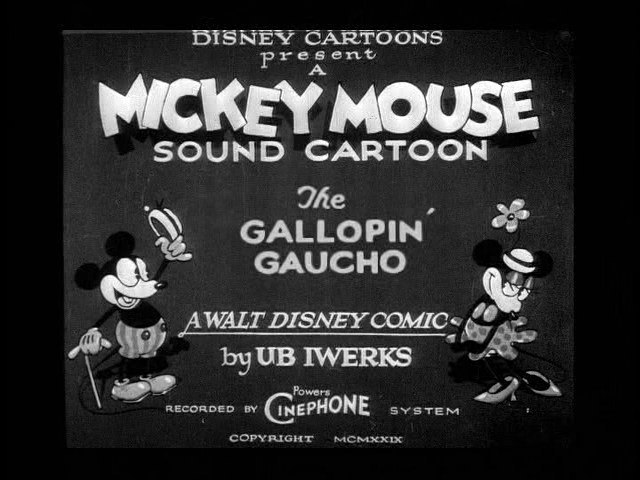
Title card of "The Gallopin' Gaucho".

Mickey is introduced riding on a rhea. He soon reaches local bar and restaurant Cantino Argentino [sic], entering the establishment with the apparent intent to relax with some drinking and smoking. On the wall, a wanted poster hangs, depicting Mickey as "El Gaucho." Already present are resident barmaid and dancer Minnie Mouse and other customers.

Minnie performs the tango with Mickey. Then the villan named Black Pete attempts to put an end to their dance by kidnapping her. He escapes on his donkey while Mickey gives chase on his drunk rhea, soon catching up to his rival. Pete and Mickey then challenge each other to a sword duel. Mickey emerges victorious, by covering Pete's head with a chamber pot he pulls out from under a bed. Having won Minnie's affection, the finale has the pair riding the rhea stage left until they are obscured entirely by trees in the foreground.

== Production ==
Mickey and Minnie Mouse first appeared in Plane Crazy on May 15, 1928, which failed to catch the attention of distributors when first produced as a silent film. The Gallopin' Gaucho was a second attempt at success by co-directors Walt Disney and Ub Iwerks. The latter also served as the sole animator for it. Roy O. Disney wrote down the total budget of the short in his ledger book, which ended up costing $4,249.73.

The short was intended as a parody of Douglas Fairbanks's The Gaucho, a film first released on November 21, 1927. Following the original film, the events of the short take place in the Pampas of Argentina with Mickey cast as the gaucho of the title. Pete makes his first appearance in the series, having already been established as an antagonist in both the Alice Comedies and the Oswald the Lucky Rabbit series. Unlike his previous appearances, he was redesigned as a cat as his previous design was owned by Universal Pictures and still being used in Walter Lantz's Oswald series. Mickey and Minnie retain their prototypical Plane Crazy designs until Pete appears, where they switch to their more familiar redesigns in future films.

== Reception ==
The Film Daily (January 6, 1929) said: "This features Mickey Mouse, the demon hero who has his ups and downs trying to rescue his sweetie who has been kidnapped by the villain Cat. In this one he takes a regular Doug Fairbanks part as a hard riding gaucho of the South American pampas. It is good burlesquing all the way, and the cartoon work of Walt Disney is clever in the extreme. It has some neat comedy effects through the addition of sound, which make the film far more enjoyable and laughable than it could possibly be in silent form."

Variety (January 9, 1929) said: "Good six minutes for the big programs because the animated drawings do some giggle getting stuff. This is Walt Disney penmanship, programmed as introducing a new cartoon character, 'Mickey Mouse', with Powers having synchronized via Cinephone. Sound effects won some laughs here on their own, but after it's all over the impression remains that any alert pit drummer can duplicate... Value in this one comes from the antics Disney makes his figures perform during a chase and a duel. Familiar enough as a plot, but some new wrinkles in body gymnastics and the fantastic means to gain numerous ends. Audience liked it and although enhanced by the effects the reel is strong enough to stand in the A houses plus just an organ or orchestra. If the musicians are smart enough to keep pace with it so much the better. An unusual cartoon in being good with or without sound."

== Music ==
The short's music was arranged by Carl Stalling and contains an instrumental version of Kingdom Coming by American composer Henry Clay Work (1862), followed by La paloma, by Spanish composer Sebastián Iradier Salaverri. La paloma is danced to by Minnie Mouse. The Gallopin' Gaucho is one of the earliest sound films to represent Latin American places and culture. Another song included in the score is For He's a Jolly Good Fellow.

== Home media ==
The short was released on December 2, 2002 on Walt Disney Treasures: Mickey Mouse in Black and White.

== See also ==
- Mickey Mouse (film series)
