= George W. Meyer =

American Tin Pan Alley songwriter (1884–1959)

- Born: January 1, 1884; Boston, Massachusetts, US
- Died: August 28, 1959; New York City, US
- Genres: popular music
- Occupation: songwriter

George William Meyer (January 1, 1884 – August 28, 1959) was an American Tin Pan Alley songwriter. He was born in Boston, Massachusetts, in 1884. He graduated from Roxbury High School, and began working in accountancy for Boston department stores, before moving to New York City in his mid-20s.

He wrote the music for the songs "For Me and My Gal", "In the Land of Beginning Again", "There Are Such Things", and many others. Meyer had a publishing company, Geo. W. Meyer Co., located at the Exchange Building, 143 West 45th Street, New York City, where he published his songs and the songs of other songwriters. He collaborated with eminent lyricists of his era, including Joe Young, Grant Clarke, Roy Turk, Arthur Johnston, Al Bryan, Edgar Leslie, E. Ray Goetz, Pete Wendling, Abel Baer and Stanley Adams.

Meyer also wrote the score for a Broadway show, Dixie to Broadway, the Blackbirds of 1926 revue that was a hit in Paris and London, and songs for films, such as Footlights and Fools (1929).

He died in New York City in 1959, aged 75. Meyer was inducted into the Songwriters Hall of Fame in 1970.

== Selected songs ==
- "Brass Band Ephraham Jones"
- "Bring Back My Daddy To Me" in 1917 (lyrics by William Tracey & Howard Johnson)
- "Cover Me Up with the Sunshine of Virginia"
- "Everything Is Peaches Down in Georgia" in 1918 with Milton Ager (lyrics by Grant Clarke)
- "For Me and My Gal" in 1917 (lyrics by Edgar Leslie and E. Ray Goetz)
- "Friends" in 1919 (lyrics by Howard Johnson & Joseph H. Santly)
- "The Girl I Left Behind Me" in 1935
- "Homeward Bound" in 1917 (lyrics by Howard Johnson & Coleman Goetz)
- "I Believe in Miracles" with Pete Wendling (lyrics by Sam M. Lewis) in 1934
- "If He Can Fight Like He Can Love, Good Night Germany!" in 1918 (lyrics by Grant Clarke & Howard E. Rogers)
- "I'm a Little Blackbird Looking for a Bluebird" in 1924
- "I'm Awfully Glad I Met You" in 1909
- "I'm Growing Fonder of You" in 1935
- "I'm Sure of Everything But You" in 1932
- "Johnny's in Town" in 1919 with Abe Olman (lyrics by Jack Yellen)
- "Just Like Washington Crossed the Delaware, General Pershing Will Cross the Rhine" in 1918 (lyrics by Howard Johnson)
- "Ki-Ki-Koo"
- "Let's All Be Americans Now" in 1917 with Irving Berlin & Edgar Leslie
- "Mandy, Make Up Your Mind" in 1924
- "My Song of the Nile" in 1929
- "Mother's Tears" in 1919 (lyrics by Sam M. Lewis & Joe Young)
- "Sittin' in a Corner" in 1923 with Gus Kahn
- "Some Lonesome Night" words by Grant Clarke and George Whiting; music by George W. Meyer
- "Someone Is Losin' Susan" in 1926
- "There Are Such Things"
- "There'll Be a Hot Time for the Old Men While the Young Men Are Away" in 1918 with Grant Clarke
- "There's a Dixie Girl Who's Longing for a Yankee Doodle Boy" (lyrics by Robert F. Roden)
- "There's a Little Lane Without a Turning on the Way to Home, Sweet Home" in 1915 (lyrics by Sam M. Lewis)
- "Tuck Me to Sleep in My Old 'Tucky Home"
- "When I First Met You"
- "Where Did Robinson Crusoe Go with Friday on Saturday Night?" (used in the musical Robinson Crusoe, Jr.) in 1916
- "You'll Find Old Dixieland in France" in 1918 (lyrics by Grant Clarke)
