= Dew-Dew-Dewey Day =

"(What Do We Do on a) Dew-Dew-Dewey Day" was a popular song dating from 1927. It was recorded by Clyde Doerr and his Orchestra. The song is a Fox Trot which contains a vocal refrain, hence the unconventional length of the record (4 minutes, 2 seconds). It was written by Tin Pan Alley tunesmiths Al Sherman, Howard Johnson and Charles Tobias. It was also recorded by Irving Kaufman and the Manhattan Dance Makers. Nearly 20 years after its release, Republican candidate Thomas Dewey revived the song for his campaign in the 1948 election. It was sung at the party's convention held in the summer of that year.

== Edison Acoustic Recordings ==
"Dew-Dew-Dewey Day" is the last of Edison's acoustically recorded selections. It was recorded on July 1, 1927, in the New York City studio. While most recording companies embraced electrical recording in the mid-1920s, Edison continued to perfect and embrace the acoustical techniques. Edison's first electrically recorded selection is generally believed to be "I'm Gonna Settle Up (Then I'm Gonna Settle Down), recording matrix number 11778. The"Dew-Dew-Dewey Day" recording matrix number is 11777.

== Technical specifications ==
- Edison Diamond Disc 52065-R Year 1927
- "Dew-Dew-Dewey Day" was transferred using a 2.7 mil truncated elliptical stylus in a Stanton 500 stereo cartridge at 80 rpm on a United Audio Dual 1219 turntable.

== Literary Sources ==
- Sherman, Robert B. Walt's Time: from before to beyond, Santa Clarita: Camphor Tree Publishers, 1998.
