= Milton Ager =

American composer (1893–1979)

Background information
- Born: October 6, 1893; Chicago, Illinois, U.S.
- Died: May 6, 1979 (aged 85) Inglewood, California
- Genres: Popular music
- Occupations: Composer, lyricist
- Instrument: Piano

Milton Ager (October 6, 1893 – May 6, 1979) was an American composer, regarded as one of the top songwriters of the 1920s and 1930s. His compositions include "Ain't She Sweet" and "Happy Days Are Here Again".

== Biography ==
Ager was born to Jewish couple Fannie Nathan and Simon Ager, who worked as a livestock dealer. in Chicago, Illinois, the sixth of nine children. He taught himself to play the piano, and attended McKinley High School, but left after only three years and embarked on a career in music.

He worked as a song plugger for music publishers Waterson, Berlin & Snyder in Chicago, and also accompanied touring singer Gene Greene and provided accompaniment to silent movies. He moved to New York City in 1914, as an arranger for the publishing firm, and began composing music in association with Pete Wendling. After some time in the US Army's Morale Division in Fort Greenleaf, Georgia, he returned to work in 1918 and wrote his first hit song, "Everything is Peaches Down in Georgia" with lyricist Grant Clarke, for Al Jolson. He then started working with lyricist Jack Yellen, and they wrote together for the 1920 Broadway show What's in a Name, featuring the song "A Young Man's Fancy". He continued to have success over the next few years with the songs "I'm Nobody's Baby" (1921, written with Benny Davis and Lester Santly), and "Who Cares?" (1922, written with Yellen).

In 1922, Ager and Yellen co-founded the publishing company of Ager, Yellen and Bornstein. He composed many hit songs over the next decade, many with lyrics by Yellen, including “The Last of the Red Hot Mamas!”, "Lovin' Sam (The Sheik of Alabam')” (1922), “Hard Hearted Hannah (The Vamp of Savannah)” (1924), "Ain't She Sweet” (1927), and “Happy Days Are Here Again” (1929). In 1930, he moved to Hollywood, and contributed to such films as Chasing Rainbows and King of Jazz (both 1930). Together with "A Bench in the Park", "Happy Days Are Here Again" was included in the latter film, and was adopted by Franklin D. Roosevelt in his 1932 presidential election campaign. After Warner Brothers bought the firm of Ager, Yellen and Bornstein, Ager continued to write lyrics successfully in Hollywood for several years, his later successes including "Auf Wiedersehen My Dear" (1932) and "Trust in Me" (1937). He effectively retired in the 1940s.

Ager was inducted into the Songwriters Hall of Fame in 1979. He died in Inglewood, California, in the same year, aged 85, and was interred in the Westwood Village Memorial Park Cemetery in Los Angeles.

In 2007, a revue of Ager's music called Vampin' Lady opened in New Hope, Pennsylvania, performed by singer Joyce Moody under the direction of Earl Wentz and transferred to New York City as part of the American Composer Series.

== Family ==
Ager's wife was columnist Cecelia Ager; the columnist Shana Alexander was their daughter. Ager's great-niece Joy Eden Harrison, a singer-songwriter, claimed that his work has been influential on her own musical career.

== Songs ==
Among the best known Milton Ager songs are:

- "Rockaway Hunt Fox Trot" (1915)
- "Erin Is Calling" (1916)
- "Tom, Dick and Harry and Jack (Hurry Back)" (1917)
- "Everything is Peaches Down in Georgia" (1918), With George W. Meyer
- "France We Have Not Forgotten You" (1918)
- "Anything is Nice" (1919)
- "Freckles" (1919)
- "There's a Lot of Blue-Eyed Marys Down in Maryland" (1919)
- "A Young Man's Fancy" (1920)
- "I'm Nobody's Baby" (1920), his first big hit
- "Lovin' Sam" (1920)
- "Who Cares?" (1920)
- "Stay Away From Louisville Lou" (1923) [also known as "Louisville Lou (That Vampin' Lady)"
- "Hard Hearted Hannah (The Vamp of Savannah)" (1924)
- "I Wonder What's Become of Sally" (1924)
- "Big Bad Bill (Is Sweet William Now)" (1924)
- "I Certainly Could" (1926)
- "Hard-To-Get Gertie" (1926)
- "Ain't She Sweet" (1927)
- "Vo-Do-De-O" (1927)
- "I Still Love You" (1928)
- "If You Don't Love Me" (1928)
- "Oh Baby" (1928)
- "Glad Rag Doll" (1928)
- "Happy Days Are Here Again" (1929)
- "I May Be Wrong" (1929)
- "Happy Feet" (1930) – a notable version is by Canadian children's entertainer Fred Penner
- "Some Day We'll Meet Again" (1932)
- ”If I Didn’t Care” (1934)
- "Trust in Me" (1937)
- "I Keep Coming Back for More" (1938)
- "Keep 'em Smiling" (1942)

Works for Broadway include:

- What's in a Name? (1920) – musical – composer
- Rain or Shine (1928) – musical – co-composer
- Murray Anderson's Almanac (1929) – revue – co-composer
