= Charles Tobias =

Musical artist (1898–1970)

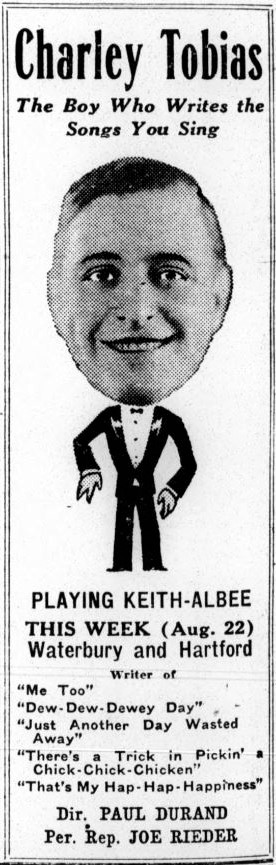
- 1927 advertisement

Background information
- Born: August 15, 1898; New York City, United States
- Died: July 7, 1970 (aged 71) Manhasset, Long Island, United States
- Occupation: Songwriter

Charles Tobias (August 15, 1898 – July 7, 1970) was an American songwriter. He was sometimes credited as Charley Tobias.

== Biography ==
Born in New York City, United States, Tobias grew up in Worcester, Massachusetts with brothers Harry Tobias and Henry Tobias, also songwriters. He started his musical career in vaudeville. In 1923, he founded his own music publishing firm and worked on Tin Pan Alley. Tobias referred to himself as "the boy who writes the songs you sing."

His credits include "Merrily We Roll Along," "Rose O'Day," "Silver Bird" (with Dee Libbey), "Those Lazy-Hazy-Crazy Days of Summer," "Comes Love," and "Don't Sit Under the Apple Tree (with Anyone Else but Me)". With frequent collaborators Al Sherman and Howard Johnson he wrote, "Dew-Dew-Dewey Day".

In the 1930s, Tobias and several of his fellow hit makers formed a revue called "Songwriters on Parade," performing across the Eastern seaboard on the Loew's and Keith circuits. He co-wrote the 1933 to 1936 Merrie Melodies theme song "I Think You're Ducky" with Gerald Marks and Sidney Clare. He later co-wrote the 1936-1964 Merrie Melodies theme song "Merrily We Roll Along" with Murray Mencher and Eddie Cantor. Immediately after Pearl Harbor, he and Cliff Friend wrote and recorded "We Did It Before and We Can Do It Again" on December 16, 1941. The song reminded the United States of World War I.

With Sammy Fain, Tobias wrote the music and lyrics to Hellzapoppin', a musical revue that ran on Broadway for over three years. It was at the time the longest-running Broadway musical, with 1,404 performances, making it one of only three plays to run more than 500 performances in the 1930s. The musical also had a film version produced by Universal Pictures in 1941.

From 1929 to 1960, Tobias contributed songs to a number of other musicals, including Manhattan Melodrama and The Daughter of Rosie O'Grady.

Tobias was inducted into the Songwriters Hall of Fame in 1970. He died in Manhasset, Long Island, on July 7, 1970 due to a liver ailment.
