= Plane Crazy =

1929 film by Walt Disney and Ub Iwerks

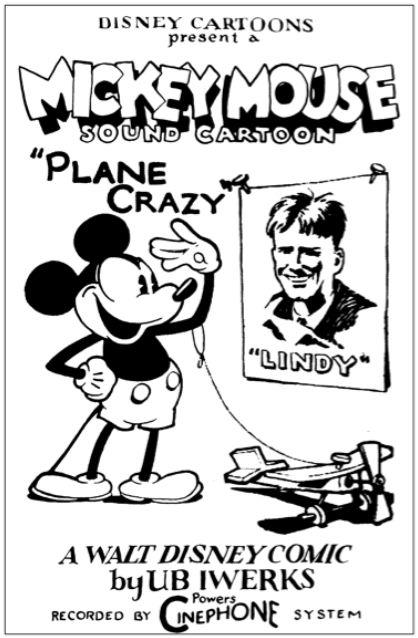
- Theatrical release poster
- Directed by: Walt Disney; Ub Iwerks
- Story by: Walt Disney; Ub Iwerks
- Produced by: Walt Disney
- Starring: Walt Disney
- Music by: Carl W. Stalling
- Animation by: Ub Iwerks
- Color process: Black and white
- Production company: Disney Cartoons
- Distributed by: Celebrity Productions
- Release dates: May 15, 1928 (screen testing); March 17, 1929 (wide release)
- Running time: 5:56 (one reel)
- Country: United States
- Language: English

Plane Crazy is a 1928 American animated short film directed by Walt Disney and Ub Iwerks. The cartoon, produced by Disney Cartoons, is the first finished film to be produced by the studio and the first produced short to star Mickey Mouse and his girlfriend Minnie Mouse. It was originally produced as a silent film before test screening to a theater audience and potential distributors on May 15, 1928. An executive from Metro-Goldwyn-Mayer saw the film, but the film failed to pick up a distributor. Later that year, Disney released Mickey's first sound cartoon, Steamboat Willie, which was an enormous success; Plane Crazy was officially released as a sound cartoon on March 17, 1929 by Celebrity Pictures. It was the fourth Mickey film to be given a wide release after Steamboat Willie, as well as The Gallopin' Gaucho and The Barn Dance (1929). Columbia Pictures reissued the film after Walt Disney Productions switched distributors.

== Plot ==
The full cartoon.

Mickey is trying to fly an airplane to imitate Charles Lindbergh. After building his own airplane, he does a flight simulation to ensure that the plane is safe for flight, but the flight fails, destroying the plane. Using a roadster, a turkey's tail and the remains of his plane to create a new plane, he asks his girlfriend Minnie to join him for its first flight after she presents him with a horseshoe for good luck. They take an out-of-control flight with exaggerated, impossible situations. Clarabelle Cow briefly "rides" the aircraft.

Once he regains control of the plane, he repeatedly tries to kiss Minnie. When she refuses, he uses force: he breaks her concentration and terrifies her by throwing her out of the airplane, catching her with the airplane, and he uses this to kiss her. Minnie responds by slapping Mickey and parachutes out of the plane using her bloomers. While distracted by her, Mickey loses control of the plane and eventually crashes into a tree. Minnie then lands, and Mickey laughs at her exposed bloomers. Minnie then storms off, rebuffing him. Mickey then angrily throws the good luck horseshoe given to him by Minnie, then flies and it boomerangs around a tree, hitting him and knocking him out.

== Production ==
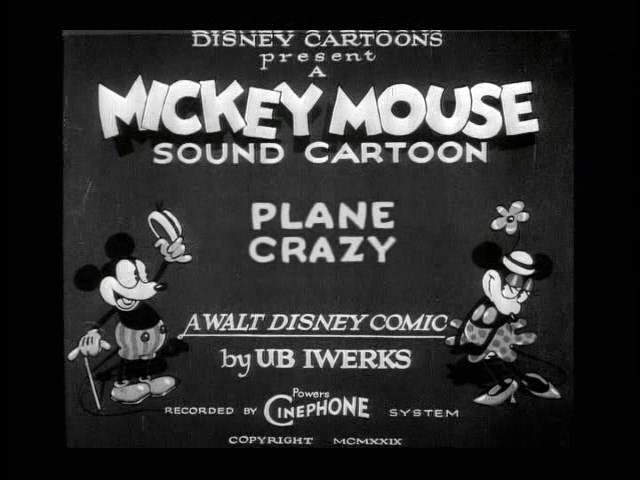
The title card of the sound version of Plane Crazy

The short was co-directed by Walt Disney and Ub Iwerks. Iwerks was also the sole animator for this short and spent just two weeks working on it in a back room, at a rate of over 700 drawings a day. It is also speculated Hugh Harman and Rudolf Ising might have done work for the short as well. The sound version contained a soundtrack by Carl W. Stalling, who recorded it on October 26, 1928, when he was hired, and a month before Steamboat Willie was released.

The point of view shot from the plane made it appear as if the camera was tracking into the ground. When they shot this scene, they piled books under the spinning background to move the artwork closer to the view.

== Reception ==
The Film Daily (March 24, 1929): "Clever. Mickey Mouse does his animal antics in the latest mode via areoplane. [sic] The cartoonist has employed his usual ingenuity to extract a volume of laughs that are by no means confined to the juveniles. The sound effects are particularly appropriate on this type of film, and certainly add greatly to the comedy angle with the absurd squeaks, yawps and goofy noises."

Variety (April 3, 1929): "Walt Disney sound cartoon, produced by Powers Cinephone, one of the Mickey Mouse series of animated cartoons. It's a snappy six minutes, with plenty of nonsensical action and a fitting musical accompaniment. Constitutes an amusingly silly interlude for any wired house. Disney has derived some breezy situations, one or two of them a bit saucy but, considering the animal characters, permissible."

== Home media ==
The short was released on December 2, 2002, on Walt Disney Treasures: Mickey Mouse in Black and White and on December 11, 2007, on Walt Disney Treasures: The Adventures of Oswald the Lucky Rabbit.

== Copyright and preservation status ==
The silent version was copyrighted on May 26, 1928, eleven days after it was test screened. The copyright for the silent version was renewed on March 14, 1956. The sound version was copyrighted on August 9, 1930, and was renewed on December 16, 1957, but the copyright on the title card of the film says 1929 (MCMXXIX). It is unknown to what extent changes were made between the original silent version and the sound version.

The silent version of the film entered the public domain in the United States on January 1, 2024. The sound version entered the public domain on January 1, 2025 according to current U.S. copyright law.

== Legacy ==
- In 1930, the story of Plane Crazy was adapted and used for the first story in the Mickey Mouse comic strip. This adaptation, entitled "Lost on a Desert Island", was written by Walt Disney with art by Ub Iwerks and Win Smith.
- In the Mickey Mouse short The Nifty Nineties (1941), Mickey and Minnie's car runs out of control and runs into a cow. The scene was taken almost directly from Plane Crazy.
- The cartoon Mickey's Airplane Kit (1999) from the series Mickey Mouse Works and House of Mouse featured a similar premise in which Mickey built his own airplane to impress Minnie.
- In the feature film Walt Before Mickey, Plane Crazy was featured.
- Plane Crazy plays in a continuous loop in the Main Street Cinema at Disneyland, albeit silently, next to Steamboat Willie.
- The airplane, horseshoe, and "How to Fly" book are on display as props from this short in the queue of the Mickey & Minnie's Runaway Railway attraction at Disneyland.

== See also ==
- Mickey Mouse (film series)
