= Howard Johnson (lyricist) =

American lyricist (1887–1941)

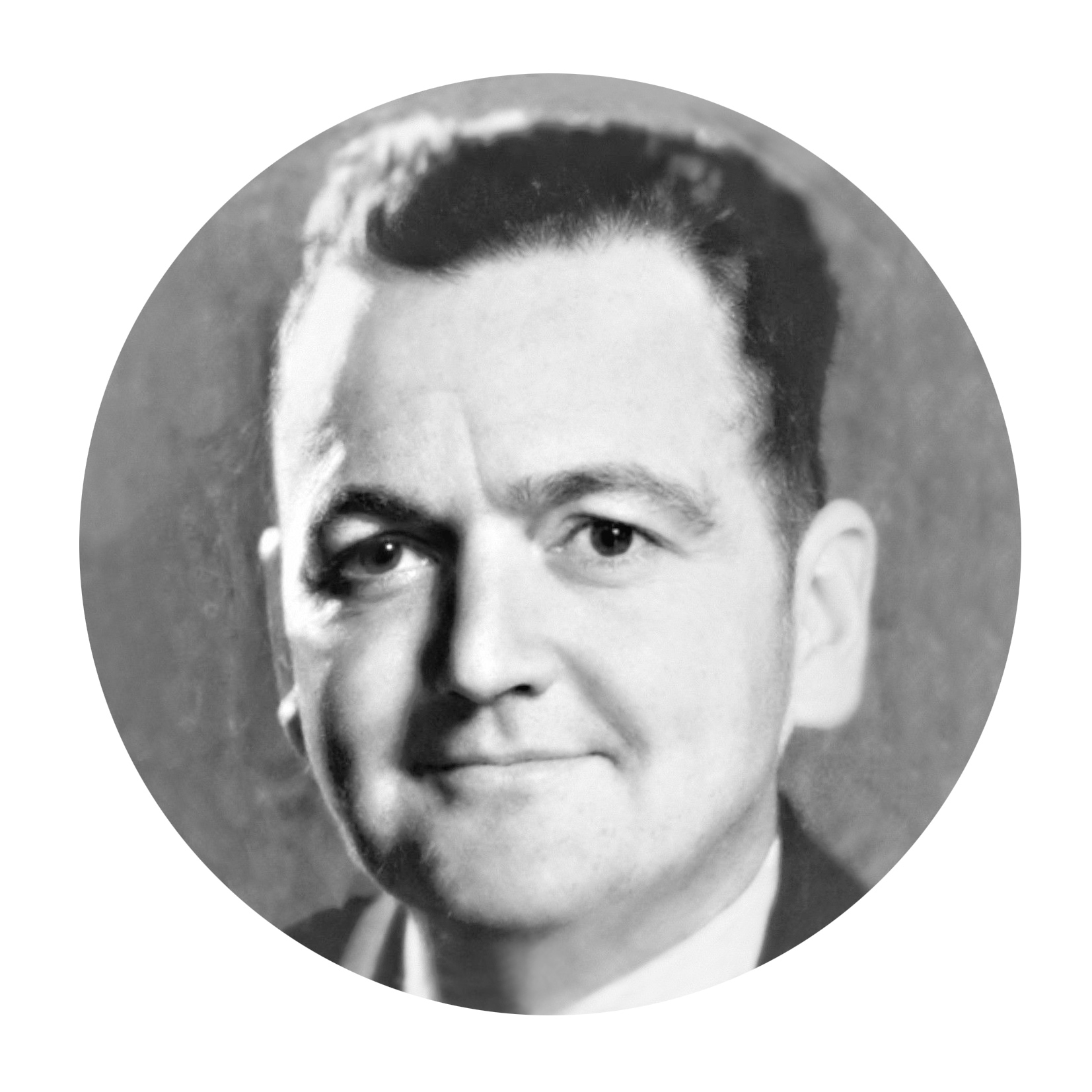

Howard Johnson (June 2, 1887 – May 1, 1941) was a song lyricist. He was inducted into the Songwriters Hall of Fame in 1970.

== Biography ==
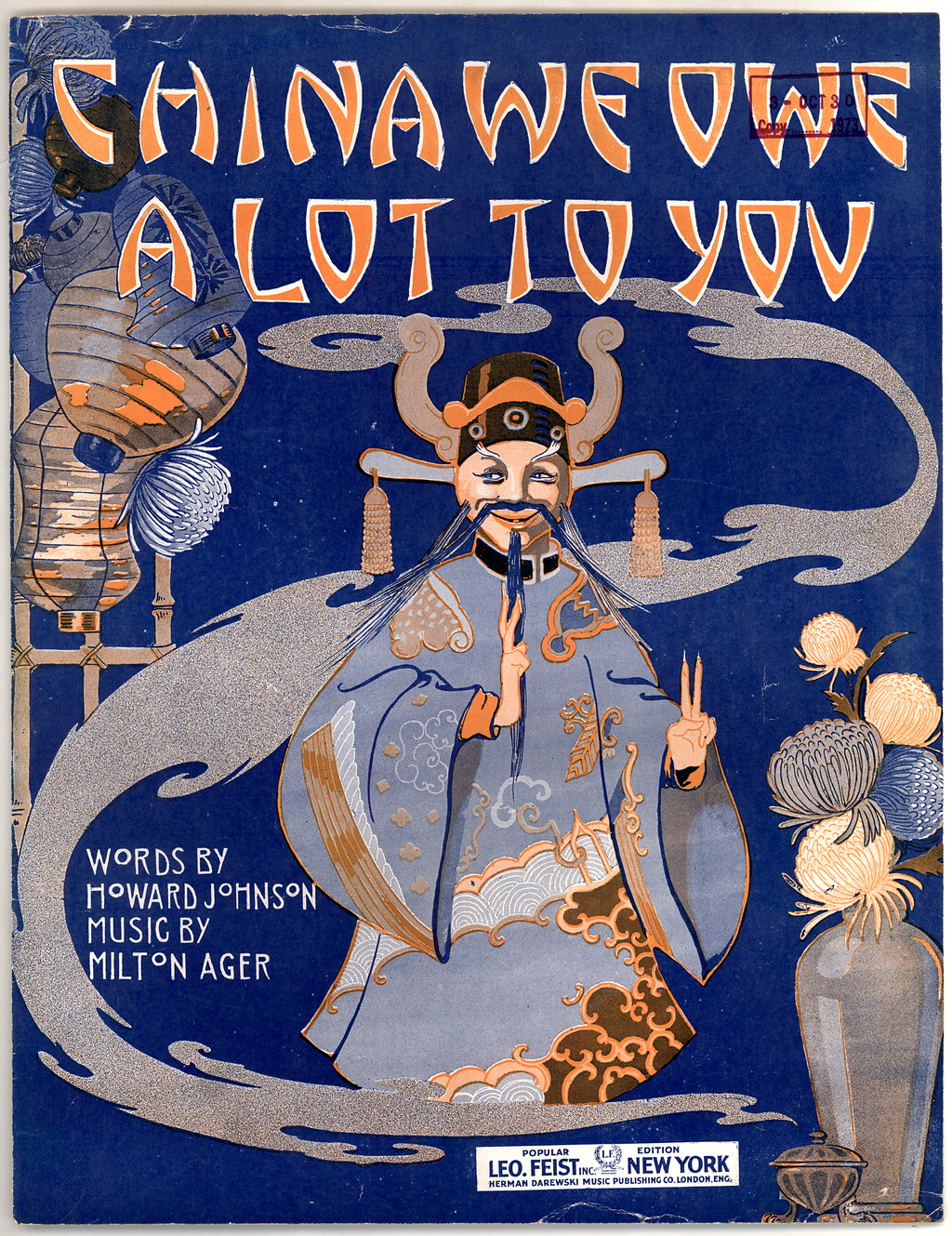
Cover for sheet music to Johnson's "China We Owe a Lot to You"

Songwriter, author and lyricist, Johnson was born in Waterbury, Connecticut, and died in New York, New York. He was educated in high school and in private music study. Johnson was a pianist in Boston theatres, and then a staff writer for a New York publishing company. During World War I, he served in the United States Navy.

Joining the American Society of Composers, Authors and Publishers (ASCAP) in 1917, his chief musical collaborators included Milton Ager, Walter Donaldson, Fred Fisher, George Meyer, Joseph Meyer, Jimmy Monaco, Al Sherman, Harry Warren, Percy Wenrich, Harry M. Woods, David Brockman, Archie Gottler, James Kendis, and W. Edward Breuder.

Johnson's most well-known song is "I Scream, You Scream, We All Scream for Ice Cream." Some popular-song compositions include: "When the Moon Comes over the Mountain", "M-O-T-H-E-R, A Word That Means the World to Me", "Ireland Must Be Heaven, for My Mother Came from There", "Sweet Lady", "What Do You Want to Make Those Eyes at Me For?", "(What Do You Do on a) Dew-Dew-Dewy Day", "Bring Back My Daddy To Me", "Where Do We Go From Here, Boys?", "There's a Broken Heart for Every Light on Broadway", "I Don't Want to Get Well", "Siam", "Georgia", "Lindbergh (The Eagle of the U.S.A.)", "Feather Your Nest", "Love Me or Leave Me Alone", "Am I Wasting My Time on You?", "Tom, Dick and Harry and Jack (Hurry Back)", and "He May Be Old, But He's Got Young Ideas".

He also wrote "I'm Glad My Wife's In Europe" in 1914 with Coleman Goertz, "Everyone Sings Tipperary So Why Not Sing" in 1915 with Jack Glogau, "It's Not Your Nationality (It's Simply You)" in 1916 with Joe McCarthy, "At the Yankee Military Ball" in 1917 with Harry Jentes, Homeward Bound in 1917 with Coleman Goetz, "China We Owe a Lot to You" in 1917 with Milton Ager, I Ain't Got Weary Yet in 1918 with Percy Wenrich, "I'd Like to See the Kaiser with a Lily in His Hand" in 1918 with Henry Lewis & Billy Frisch, "Kicking the Kaiser Around" in 1918 with Harry Jentes, "Navy Will Bring Them Back" in 1918 with Ira Schuster and "Friends" in 1919 with Joseph H. Santly.
