= Joe Bennett (dancer) =

Joe Bennett (1889 – August 31, 1967) was an American vaudeville eccentric dancer. Harland Dixon described him as "[having] legs of iron ... He only had a few routines but they were gifts from heaven – the greatest comedy dancer I ever saw." Bennett was also said to have been an "able singer".

== Biography ==
He was born in 1889 in Charleston, South Carolina. He started his dancing career with the William S. West Minstrels. He debuted in vaudeville in 1917 at the Colonial Theatre in an act with Edward Richards. The two were said to have "walked away with the entire show". The two were headliners at the Palace Theatre within the next year. Bennett performed in the 1937 movie, Something to Sing About, alongside James Cagney. He died on August 31, 1967, at Our Lady of Consolation in Amityville, New York, at age 78.
