= Peggy Dolan =

American actress

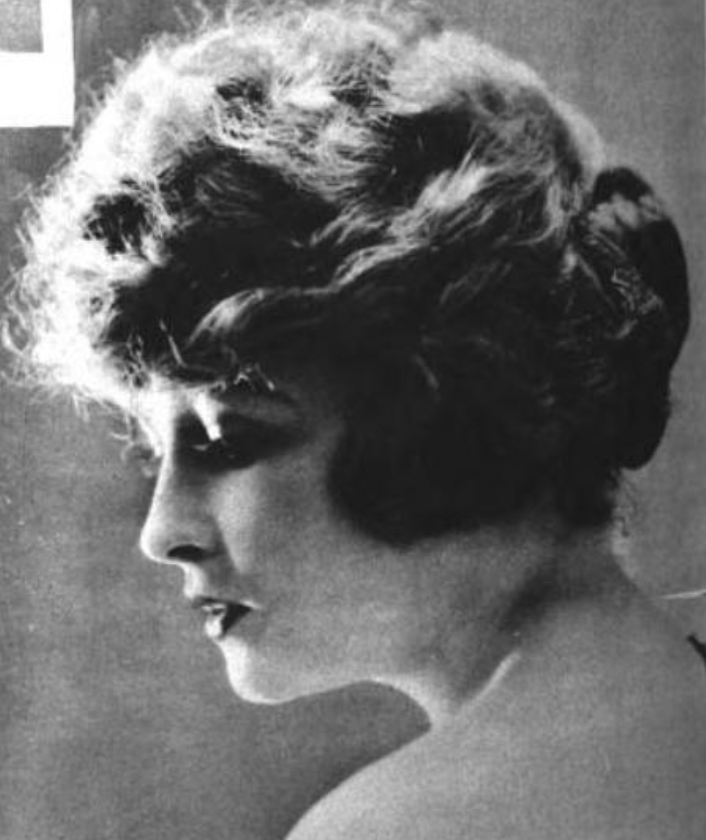
Peggy Dolan, from a 1920 publication

Peggy Dolan was an American dancer and actress in theater and vaudeville in the 1920s.

== Social prominence ==
Dolan was from Newark, New Jersey. Her parents were Mr. and Mrs. Henry Hoffman Dolan. Her grandmother was Mrs. Thomas J. Dolan (née Isabel W. Hoffman) of Villanova, Pennsylvania. Peggy was a guest of former New York governor Alfred E. Smith at a birthday party for his son, Alfred E. Smith, Jr., in January 1930. The birthday dinner took place at the Patio Lamaze in Palm Beach, Florida.

== Beauty pageant ==
She competed in a national beauty contest in Universal City in June 1915. Dolan was a third runner-up to Ruth M. Purcell of Washington, D.C., who was crowned the most beautiful girl in America from among sixty contestants.

== Dancing career ==
In June 1920 Dolan appeared with George White's Scandals, in a revue which began performing as Scandals of 1920. The production was staged at the Globe Theater in New York City. The music was written by George Gershwin with lyrics by Arthur Jackson. The show was produced by White and Andrew Rice. The troupe was headed by White and Ann Pennington.

Dolan acted with Edward Leiter and Joe Kearns in Truth, staged at the Sum-Toy-Sho Theater in Los Angeles, California, in March 1926. Dolan played the feminine lead. In 1928 she was in the cast of the operatic comedy The Red Robe. It was presented at the Shubert Theater in New Haven, Connecticut, prior to its Broadway debut. Manilla Powers and Gloria Foy were among the show's players.

Dolan teamed with Nina Underwood to provide singing and dancing for an annual fashion show conducted by the National Secretaries Association in November 1958. Autumn Leaves was the theme of the event which was held in Downey, California.

== Damage lawsuit ==
Dolan was the subject of testimony given during the trial of Franklyn Ardell, a singer and comedian with the George White revue. He was dismissed by White after it was discovered that he was providing chorus girls with drinks (alcoholic beverages) on stage, in his dressing room, and at Dinty Moore's restaurant, near the Globe Theater. Marian Courtney, one of the dancers at a party given by Ardell, testified at his trial, which came before the New York Supreme Court in March 1925. Ardell sued White for $27,000, the amount he lost when his $600 per week contract was terminated by the theatrical manager. Ardell contended that he was fired because the production was not doing well financially. Furthermore, White did not extend him the five or six weeks notice he should have been granted. Katherine Chapman gave testimony that she accompanied Dolan when she was asked by Ardell to go with him to a Long Island club. Dolan did not want to go alone. Ardell lost his suit.
