= Eccentric dance =

Type of dance

The Anglo-American act of Wilson, Keppel and Betty have been acclaimed as the greatest eccentric dance act. Their routine had a mock Egyptian style and their dance moves included tap, soft-shoe and sand-dancing.

Eccentric dance is a style of dance performance in which the moves are unconventional and individualistic. It developed as a genre in the United States in the late 19th and early 20th centuries as a result of the influence of African and exotic dancers on the traditional styles of clog and tap dancing. Instead of holding the body stiff and straight in the style of a jig, acrobatics such as flips and contortions were used in a more exuberant, expressive and idiosyncratic way.

The style was used in stage performances such as minstrel shows, music hall or vaudeville. Dance styles which used eccentric moves and encouraged improvisation, such as the Charleston, became popular crazes in the 1920s. It was used in movies to provide comic relief.

Early distinctive forms of eccentric dancing had names like rubber legs or legmania. Rubberlegging involved leg shaking or snaking which later evolved into Shag and the showcase style of Elvis Presley, while legmania added leaps and kicks in the air. An example of legmania is Ray Bolger's performance as the Scarecrow singing "If I Only Had a Brain" in The Wizard of Oz.

Joel Schechter describes eccentric dance as the "vaudevillian impulse to dance like crazy, even if the legs do not agree with the upper torso, or the music, about which way to go." Marshall Winslow Stearns defines it as follows:

The term "eccentric" is a catchall for dancers who have their own non-standard movements and sell themselves on their individual styles. It has been used to describe a variety of highly personal performances by dancer-comedians on Broadway. Thus, George M. Cohan, Leon Errol, Joe Frisco, George White, Harland Dixon, Jack Donahue, James Barton, Tom Patricola, Hal Leroy, Buddy Ebsen, and Ray Bolger have all been labeled eccentric dancers at one time or another, although some are much more than that, and James Barton, for example, used eccentric movements along with a wealth of other and perhaps finer steps.

== Eccentric dancers ==
- Joe Bennett (1889–1967)
- Tony Azito (1948–1995)
- James Barton (1890–1962)
- Ray Bolger (1904–1987)
- George M. Cohan (1878–1942)
- Harland Dixon
- Jack Donahue (1888–1930)
- Gordon Dooley (1899–1930)
- Buddy Ebsen (1908–2003)
- Fred Stone
- Leon Errol
- Joe Frisco (1889–1958)
- Eddie Foy, Sr. (1905–1983)
- Hal Leroy (1913–1985)
- Jack Lorimer (1883–1920)
- Tom Patricola (1891–1950)
- Hal Sherman (1897–1985)
- George Wallace (1895–1960)
- George White
- Wilson, Keppel and Betty

== See also ==
- Character dance
- Grotesque dance
- Street dance
