= Anybody's Woman =

1930 film

- Theatrical release poster
- Directed by: Dorothy Arzner
- Screenplay by: Zoe Akins; Doris Anderson; Gouverneur Morris
- Starring: Ruth Chatterton; Clive Brook; Paul Lukas; Huntley Gordon; Virginia Hammond; Tom Patricola; Juliette Compton
- Cinematography: Charles Lang
- Edited by: Jane Loring
- Music by: Karl Hajos
- Production company: Paramount Pictures
- Distributed by: Paramount Pictures
- Release date: August 15, 1930
- Running time: 80 minutes
- Country: United States
- Language: English

Anybody's Woman is a 1930 American pre-Code drama film directed by Dorothy Arzner and written by Zoe Akins and Doris Anderson, as based on the short story "The Better Wife", which had been written by Gouverneur Morris; the movie was formerly known as The Better Wife prior to changing the title. The film stars Ruth Chatterton, Clive Brook, Paul Lukas, Huntley Gordon, Virginia Hammond, Tom Patricola, and Juliette Compton. The film was released on August 15, 1930, by Paramount Pictures.

== Plot ==
Neil Dunlap, an attorney whose wife has left him for a richer man, goes on a drinking binge and impulsively marries his neighbor Pansy Gray, a burlesque performer he once defended in court. After initially contemplating annulment, the unusual couple decide to try making the marriage work.

== Cast ==
- Ruth Chatterton as Pansy Gray
- Clive Brook as Neil Dunlap
- Paul Lukas as Gustave Saxon
- Huntley Gordon as Grant Crosby
- Virginia Hammond as Katherine Malcolm
- Tom Patricola as Eddie Calcio
- Juliette Compton as Ellen
- Cecil Cunningham as Dot
- Charles K. Gerrard as Walter Harvey
- Harvey Clark as Mr. Tanner
- Sidney Bracey as Butler
- Gertrude Sutton as Maid

== Reception ==
Variety stated "The picture will appeal to some and probably not to others", believing the "social ostracism" angle was overdone. Fred Camper of The Chicago Reader in 2004 noted the parallels presented in the film about an outsider's attempt to make it in a different world and Arzner's life as one of the few women filmmakers and a lesbian while also calling the directing "only competent." Mordaunt Hall of The New York Times called the story "invariably amateurish in its writing and its development."
