= Children of Dreams =

1931 film

- Theatrical release poster
- Directed by: Alan Crosland
- Written by: Oscar Hammerstein II; Sigmund Romberg
- Starring: Paul Gregory; Margaret Schilling; Tom Patricola; Marion Byron
- Cinematography: James Van Trees (Technicolor)
- Edited by: Harold McLernon
- Music by: Oscar Hammerstein II; Otto A. Harbach; David Mendoza
- Production company: Warner Bros. Pictures
- Distributed by: Warner Bros. Pictures
- Release date: July 25, 1931
- Running time: 78 minutes
- Country: United States
- Language: English

Children of Dreams is a 1931 American pre-Code musical operetta drama film photographed entirely in Technicolor and produced and distributed by Warner Bros. Pictures.

The film was directed by Alan Crosland. Children of Dreams was the second original operetta written especially for the screen by Oscar Hammerstein II and Sigmund Romberg. This team had previously worked on the musical Viennese Nights, which had proved to be a success. The film had the misfortune of being released at a time when the public had grown weary of musicals and did poorly at the box office.

It was the only full-scale musical to be released in the summer of 1931. Although Children of Dreams was filmed in color and exhibited in a few select areas in color, Warner Bros. decided to circulate black-and-white prints in many areas as a cost saving measure due to the backlash against musicals.

== Plot ==
One day, Molly Standing is picking apples in her father's apple orchard in California, with her friend Gertie, when they meet two boys, Tommy Melville and Gus Schultz. Molly falls in love with Tommy while Gertie falls in love with Gus. They plan a double wedding.

Gerald Winters and his mother, who are wealthy art patrons, hear Molly singing, and, at Gerald's suggestion, since he is very attracted to her, they sponsor her to study in Italy. Molly is reluctant to go but finally accepts when she discovers her father is in need of money. She leaves on the day that Tommy had hoped would be their wedding day. He says goodbye to her before attending Gertie and Gus's wedding ceremony.

Molly becomes a success in Rome. She returns to the United States to sing at the Metropolitan Opera House in New York City, where she is again a great success. After the performance, Tommy attends the party which has been given by Gerald and his mother. Molly asks Tommy to sing, but her society friends do not think much of his singing. Realizing that Molly now lives in a world far apart from his, Tommy breaks off his engagement and returns to the orchards.

Molly stays in New York for two years and then moves on to San Francisco for a concert stop. Although she is supposed to marry Gerald soon, she is unhappy. She goes to her father's orchards to visit her old friend Gertie, to see how things are going with her. She happens to run into Tommy, and they rekindle their love and are married. Before they leave on their honeymoon, the doctor informs Molly's manager and Tommy that Schilling has lost her voice and will never sing again, except perhaps, a lullaby.

== Cast ==
- Margaret Schilling as Molly Standing
- Paul Gregory as Tommy Melville
- Tom Patricola as Gus Schultz
- Bruce Winston as Hubert Standing
- Charles Winninger as Dr. Joe Thompson
- Marion Byron as Gertie

== Songs ==
- "Fruit Picker's Song"
- "Oh, Couldn't I Love That Girl"
- "Her Professor"
- "Children of Dreams"
- "Sleeping Beauty"
- "If I Had a Girl Like You"
- "Seek Love"
- "That Rare Romance"
- "Goodbye, My Love, Goodbye"
- "Yes Sir"

== Preservation status ==
The film is believed to be lost. The soundtrack, which was recorded separately on Vitaphone disks, may survive in private hands.

== See also ==
- List of lost films
- List of incomplete or partially lost films
- List of early color feature films
