= Tom Patricola =

American actor

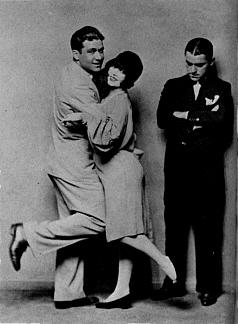
- Tom Patricola & Ann Pennington do the Black Bottom as George White looks on (circa 1926)
- Born: Tomasso Patricola; January 22, 1891; New Orleans, Louisiana, U.S.
- Died: January 1, 1950 (aged 58); Los Angeles, California, U.S.
- Occupations: Dancer; comedian; actor

Tomasso Patricola (January 22, 1891 – January 1, 1950) was an American actor, comic and dancer who starred in vaudeville and motion pictures.

Born in New Orleans, Patricola established his fame as a hoofer, becoming a leading interpreter of the Black Bottom dance. Besides excelling at eccentric dances, Patricola also sang and played the ukulele. Marketing himself as a novelty act, Patricola was described as a "mop gone crazy" as he danced while simultaneously singing and playing the ukulele. He was also a noted clog dancer.

== Career ==
His fame as a song and dance man was assured by five seasons as a headliner with George White's Scandals, a Broadway musical revue, from 1923 to 1926 and 1928. He was noted for dancing the Black Bottom with Ann Pennington in the 1926 version of Scandals. While employed by George White, Patricola was coached by the African American choreographer Buddy Bradley. With the advent of the talkies, Fox Film Corp. signed Patricola on as a contract player. He made his movie debut in the comic musical Words and Music (1929), which was the first credited screen appearance of John Wayne (billed as "Duke Morrison"), but unlike The Duke, he never became a star, let alone a cinematic legend. From 1929 to 1931, he appeared in feature-length musicals and several Spanish-language versions of English-language pictures. After mid-1931, he began appearing in comic shorts made by the Educational Film Corp. of America that were released by Fox.

Patricola made his last short for Educational in 1938. Thereafter, he only made two confirmed appearances in movies, in uncredited bit parts. In the more notable of the two, (Rhapsody in Blue, 1945), he recreated the George Gershwin hit "Somebody Loves Me" that he introduced in George White's Scandals of 1924. He made one final appearance on Broadway in the musical-comedy Hold Your Horses, which ran for 88 performances in 1933. He reportedly appeared in George White's 1932 Broadway revue Music Hall Varieties.

== Death ==
Patricola died on New Year's Day, 1950 in Pasadena, three weeks before his 59th birthday, after undergoing brain surgery. His sister, Isabella, had a successful career in vaudeville as a singer and violinist. She recorded "Somebody Loves Me" in 1924.

== Filmography ==
Year	Title	Role	Notes
1929	Words and Music	Hannibal	
1929	Happy Days	Minstrel Show Performer #3	
1929	Married in Hollywood	Mahai	
1929	Frozen Justice	Dancer	
1929	South Sea Rose	Willie Gump	
1930	The Three Sisters	Tony	
1930	One Mad Kiss	Paco	
1930	El precio de un beso	Paco	
1930	Anybody's Woman	Eddie Calcio	
1931	Children of Dreams	Gus Schultz	
1941	Louisiana Purchase	Cab Driver	Uncredited
1942	Secrets of a Co-Ed	Minor Role	Uncredited
1945	Rhapsody in Blue	Tom	Uncredited, (final film role)
