= Kim Loo Sisters =

American jazz vocal quartet

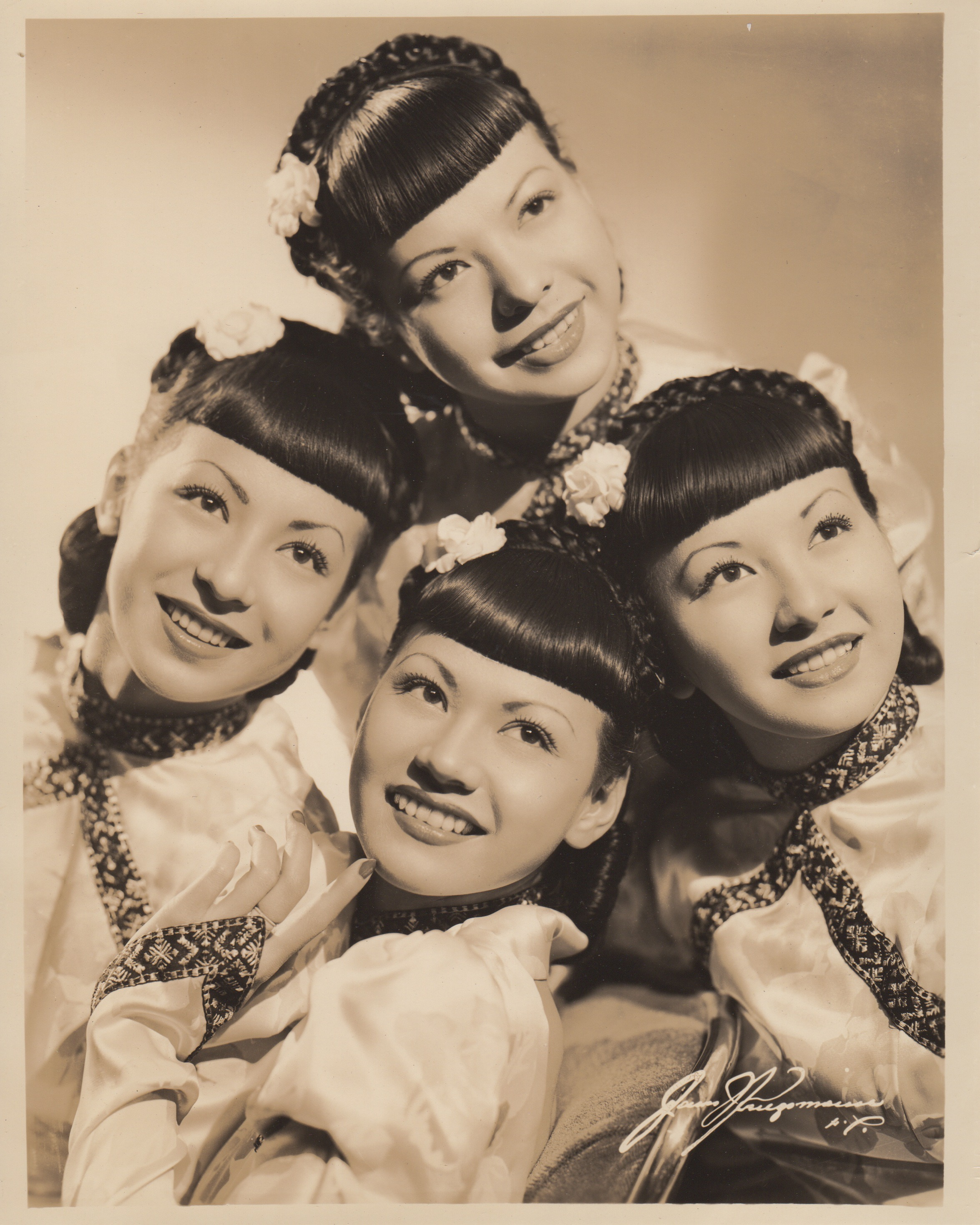
The Kim Loo Sisters—Alice, Maggie, Jenée, and Bubbles. Photo by James Kriegsmann, ca. 1939

The Kim Loo Sisters were an American jazz vocal quartet popular during the swing era. The close harmony group consisted of Alice (August 22, 1916 – April 16, 2011), Margaret "Maggie" (November 4, 1917 – July 14, 2016), Genevieve "Jenée" (May 19, 1920 – November 3, 2019), and Patricia "Bubbles" (October 3, 1922 - October 1, 2021).

The sisters began their careers as child entertainers in kiddie revues in and around their hometown of Minneapolis, Minnesota, during the Jazz Age (1920–1929). They traveled with the vaudeville circuits during the Great Depression (1929–1939). During the Second World War (1939–1945), they appeared on the Broadway stage and the Hollywood screen with actors including Frank Sinatra, Ann Miller, The Three Stooges, Jackie Gleason, and Louis Jordan. Dubbed "the Chinese Andrews Sisters", the Kim Loo Sisters were arguably the first Asian American act to star in Broadway musical revues.

== Early life ==
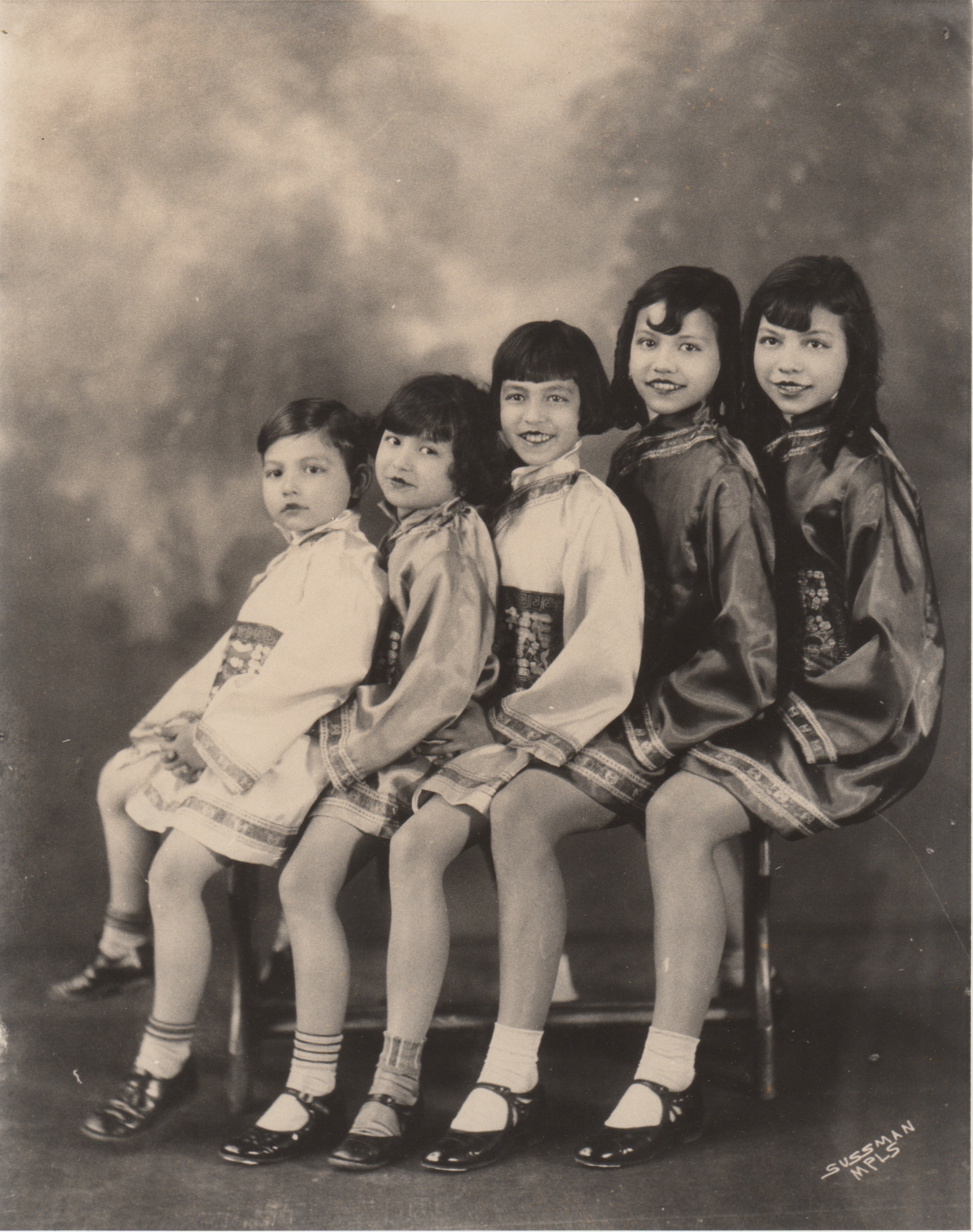
The Early Years of the Kim Loo Sisters. Photograph by Sussman, Minneapolis, ca. 1928

Alice, Maggie, Jenée and Bubbles were born to Louie Shear Gim and Michelena “Lena” Louie (née Wojcik) in the Twin Cities (Minneapolis-St Paul), Minnesota. Their father was Chinese from Guangzhou (Canton), Guangdong. Their mother was Polish from Buczacz, Poland, now Buchach, Ukraine. Lena had two more children—son Lowell and daughter Nerée.

The sisters were “discovered” by Paul Whiteman (“King of Jazz”) and his Orchestra. Together with their mother and two youngest siblings, they became the family act Louie's Chinese Revue.

== Louie’s Chinese Revue ==
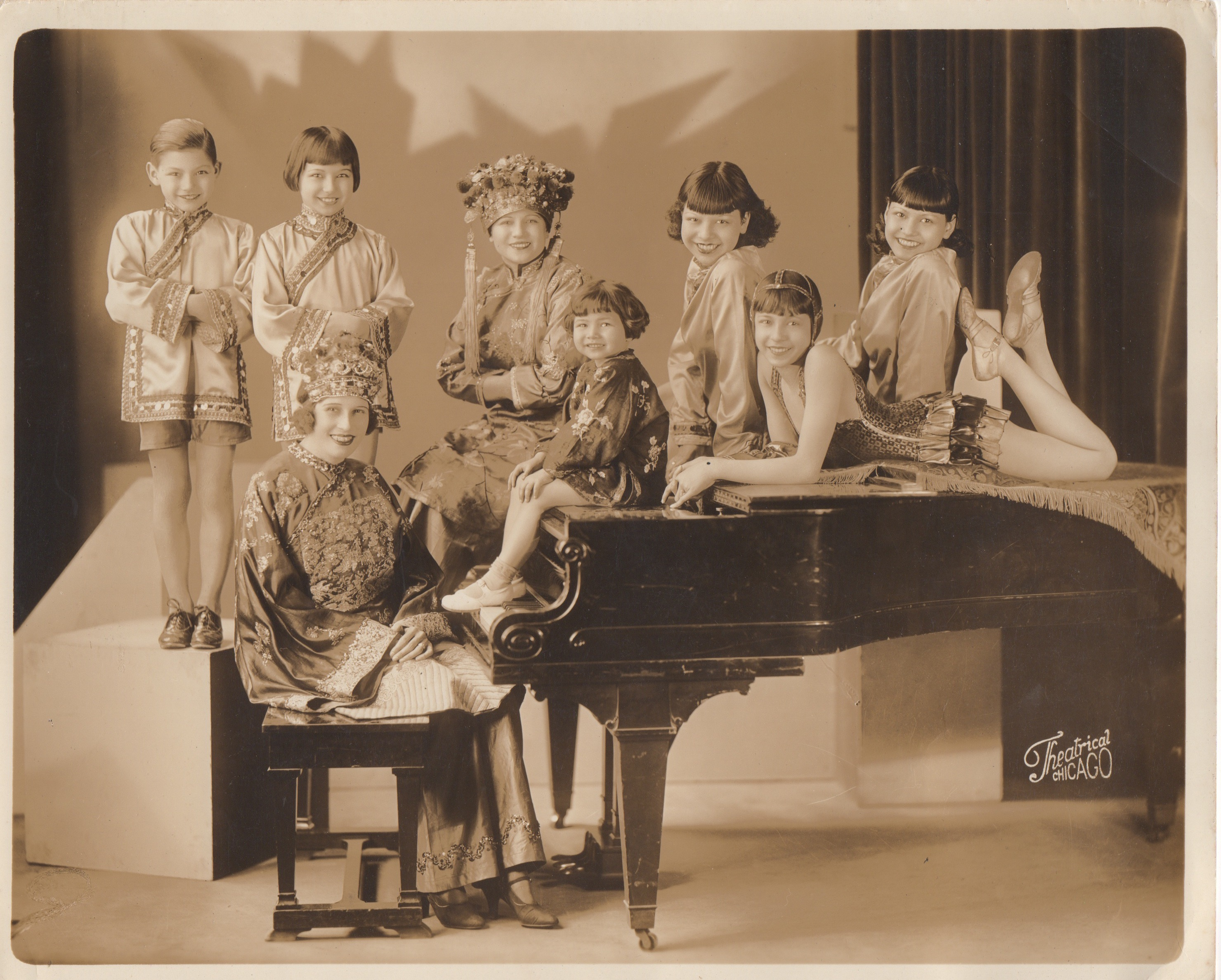
Louie's Chinese Revue. Photo by Theatrical/Chicago. Circa 1930

Combining singing, dancing and acrobatics, Louie's Chinese Revue traveled with the vaudeville circuits west of their new base, Chicago: Orpheum, Pantages, Fox and Paramount.

After Lowell and Nerée returned home to the Twin Cities to finish their schooling. Lena concentrated on her four oldest—Alice, Maggie, Jenée and Bubbles who reinvented themselves as the Kim Loo Sisters. They sang a new style of music—swing—that was sweeping the country.

== The Four Kim Loo Sisters ==
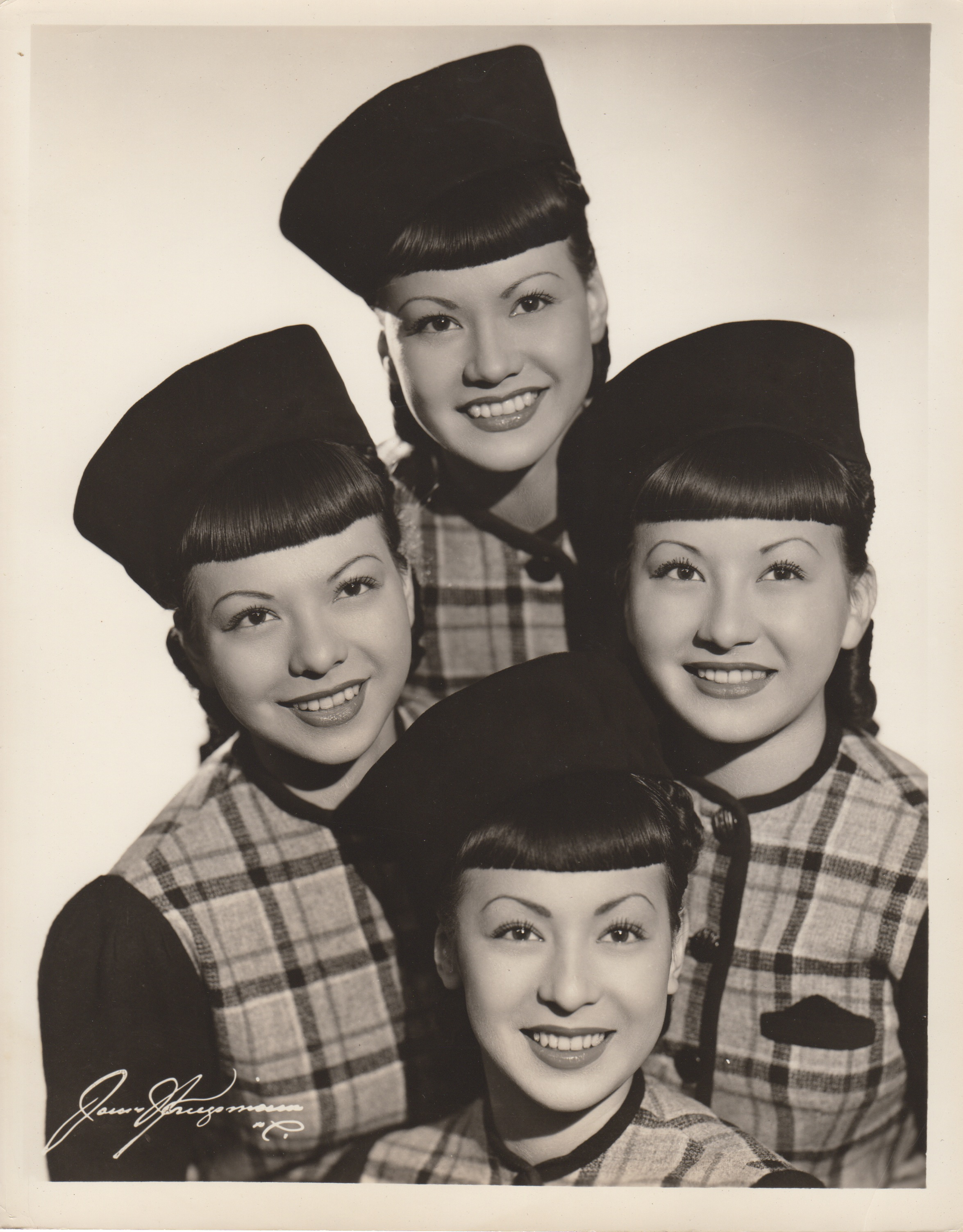
The Four Kim Loo Sisters in Hats. Photo by James Kriegsmann, Circa 1939

The sisters started out as a jazz vocal quartet in all-Chinese revues with other Chinese and Chinese-American entertainers, including Toy and Wing and Joe Wong. Their big break came when Broadway impresario George White hired them for his last Broadway musical revue, The Scandals of 1939 which opened at the Alvin Theater in New York. Other performers included comedians The Three Stooges and Ben Blue and singer Ella Logan.

The hit of the show was the “Mexiconga.” The four sisters each played a bongo drum and pounded out a different rhythm for Ann Miller’s call-and-response tap dance number.

Bolstered by the success of the Scandals, which ran on Broadway and toured for three years, the sisters made New York City their home.

== Career Interruption ==
Just as their star was ascending, Jenée left the act to marry Li Youlin, the son of Chinese general Li Zongren (Li Tsung-jen), who in 1948 became vice president of Nationalist China under president Chiang Kai-shek. Her three sisters carried on as a trio.

== The Three Kim Loo Sisters ==
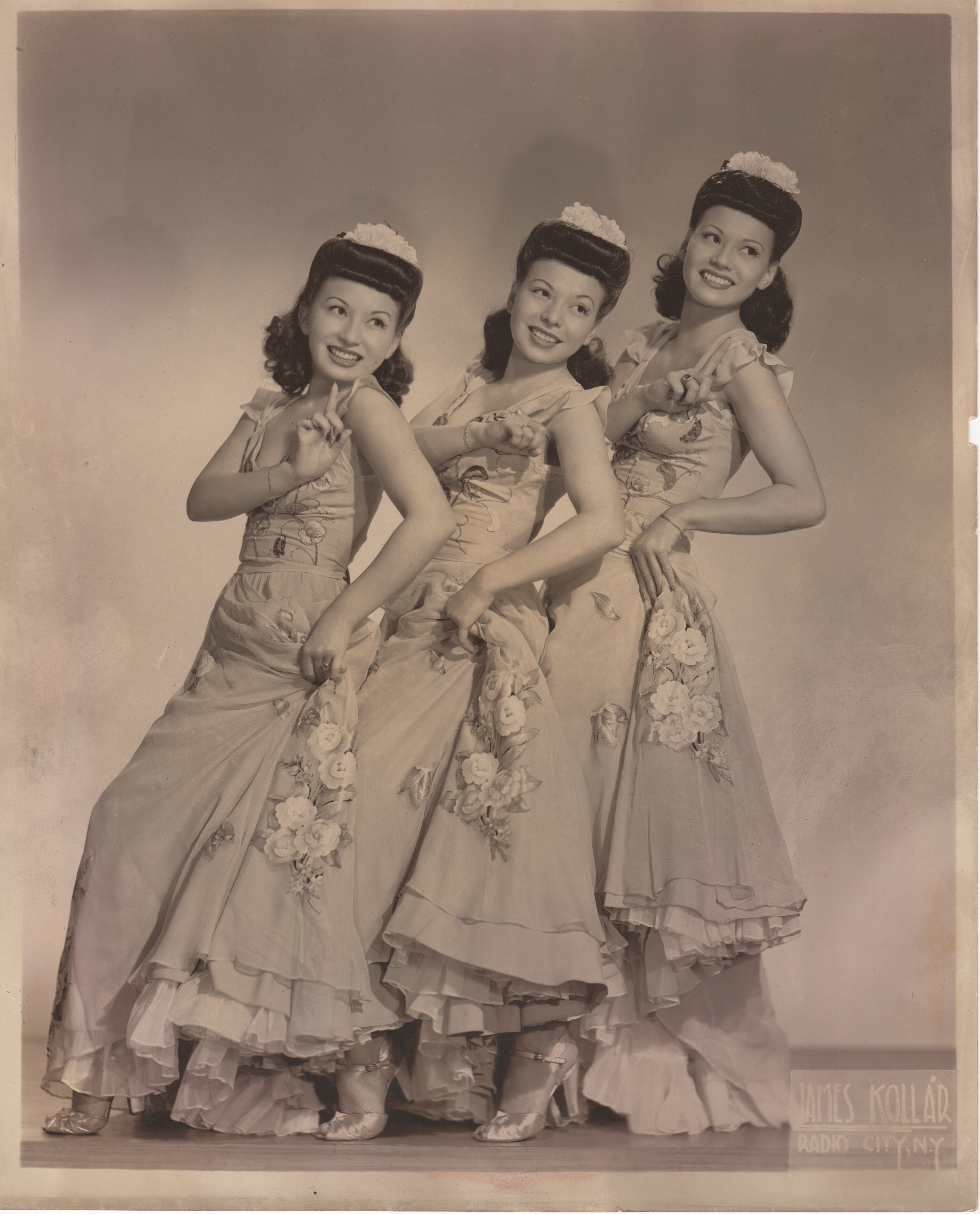
The Three Kim Loo Sisters. Photo by James Kollar/Radio City, New York, ca. 1941

Alice, Maggie and Bubbles returned to Broadway where they shared top billing with crooner Frank Sinatra in the all-star revue, Cavalcade of America. They appeared with Jackie Gleason in “Hellzapoppin” at the Shubert Theatre, and with Peter Lind Hayes and Mary Healy in “Hollywood Sweater Girl Revue” at the Edison Hotel. They also performed at the iconic Astor Roof at the Astor Hotel in New York, following Benny Goodman and his Orchestra.

With the outbreak of the Second World War, the sisters entertained American servicemen in United Service Organization (USO) camp shows across the country. They also joined Ina Ray Hutton and her Orchestra, a female-led all-male big band.

The Kim Loo Sisters made the transition from stage to screen with the Hollywood feature film “Meet Miss Bobby Socks” (1944). The sisters also starred in two Soundies—“Take Me Out to the Ball Game” (1943) and “Gee! The Jeep Jumps” (1944). The latter was selected by the Library of Congress for their film archive.

In 1944, the Kimmies signed on with the USO and shipped out with the fleet to entertain American and Allied troops stationed in the Mediterranean theatre of operations headquartered in Naples, Italy. They played to over 121,000 troops in the 158 performances they gave during their 23-week tour in Europe. When they returned to the United States, Alice married Jack Purcell, the sole guitarist with Ina Ray Hutton and her Orchestra; and Bubbles married Stuart Foster, the sole male vocalist. Before the sisters left for Europe, Maggie had married Dan Kenyon, trumpeter in the Milt Britton Band.

== Married life and second careers ==
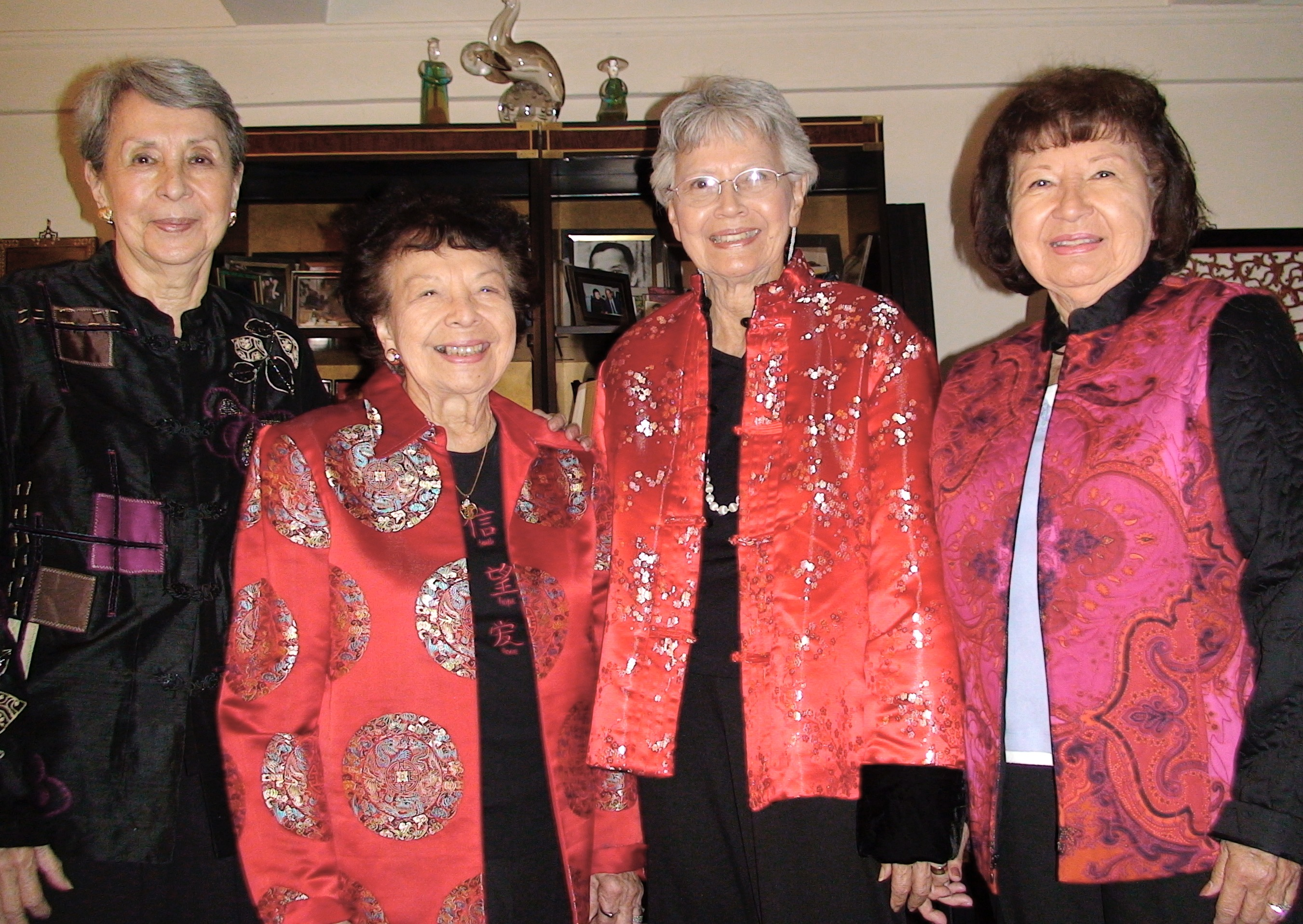
The Kim Loo Sisters in 2007. Photo by Leslie Li.

In 1950, together with her husband and their four daughters, Jenée returned to the United States from the People's Republic of China (PRC) after Mao Zedong came to power.

They chose New York City as their home. Alice and Jack Purcell and their two daughters also resided in New York City and later moved to New Jersey. Maggie and Dan Kenyon had two sons and lived in California. Bubbles, her husband Stuart Foster and their son lived on Long Island in the house the four sisters had bought for their parents. After the death of her first husband, Bubbles married Sid Cooper, lead saxophone player on The Johnny Carson Show.

All four sisters had second careers far from the limelight. Alice worked as a typist at the Westwood Department of Health in New Jersey until she retired at 91. Maggie was a designer for French Rags, a knitwear company based in California. Later, she sold knitting machines until she retired at 70. Jenée was a buyer of intimate apparel, robes and loungewear at Saks Fifth Avenue in New York and, later, at Joseph Magnin in San Francisco. Returning to the East Coast, she became fashion coordinator of Macy's-Bamberger's until her retirement at 69. Bubbles was employed as a saleswoman for the Plymouth Shops on Long Island until she moved to Florida with her second husband Sid Cooper.

== Blended 和 (Harmony) ==
Blended 和 (Harmony) is a musical that celebrates the life and career of the four sisters. The book was written by Jessica Huang, music composed by Jacinth Greywoode, and stage direction by Lily Tung Crystal. It premiered in Minneapolis, at the History Theatre, and ran for 3 weeks.
