= The Honeymoon Express (musical) =

The Honeymoon Express is a musical in two acts and six scenes with music by Jean Schwartz, lyrics by Harold Atteridge, and a book by Joseph W. Herbert. Frank Saddler orchestrated the score. Essentially a musical revue, the work had a loose plot which was crafted around the talents of its star-studded cast, among them Al Jolson, Fanny Brice, Gaby Deslys, and Jenny Dolly. The show was notable for its elaborate costumes and sets and for its groundbreaking special effects for that time period; including possibly the first use of film footage on the stage of a Broadway musical.

== Plot ==
Married couple Yvonne and Henri Dubonet love one another, but their constant fighting has led them to the decision to divorce. Yvonne's attorney, Baudry, pursues her romantically and they enjoy dancing together, but he fails to win Yvonne's heart. Meanwhile, thinking has is now divorced to Yvonne, Henri has become engaged to Marguerite and they leave for Paris, France on the Honeymoon Express. Yvonne discovers a legal error in her divorce to Henri, and realizes that they are in fact still married. She races to Paris to try to find Henri and convince him to come back to her. A bedroom farce ensues with Henri, Yvonne, and Marguerite all staying in the some hotel suite.

== History ==
The Honeymoon Express was produced by brothers J. J. and Lee Shubert. It premiered at Broadway's Winter Garden Theatre on February 6, 1913, where it ran for 156 performances; closing on June 14, 1913. The musical was staged by Ned Wayburn and conductor Oscar Radin was musical director. The sets were designed by Theodore Reisig and William Little. The work was notable for its employment of film for to project life sizes images of a train and cars for chase scenes which also incorporated flashing lights and fog to emulate engine steam; incorporating film in a way not before seen on the Broadway stage. This "cutting-edge technology" made the show tremendously popular and it was a commercial success.

The musical starred Al Jolson as Gus, Fanny Brice as Marcelle, Ernest Glendinning as Henri Dubonet, Gaby Deslys as Yvonne Dubonet, Jenny Dolly as Marguerite (credited as Yansci Dolly), Harry Pilcer as Baudry, Harry Fox as Pierre, Marjorie Lane as Noelie, Louis Anger as Gardonne, Harland Dixon as Alphonse, Adah Lewis as Mme. de Bressie, James Doyle as Gaston, Frank Holmes as Achille, Gerald McDonald as Gautier, Harry Wardell as Felix, and Melville Ellis as Doctor D'Zuvay. Ellis also served as the show's costume designer.
