= The Three Sisters (1930 film) =

1930 film by Paul Sloane

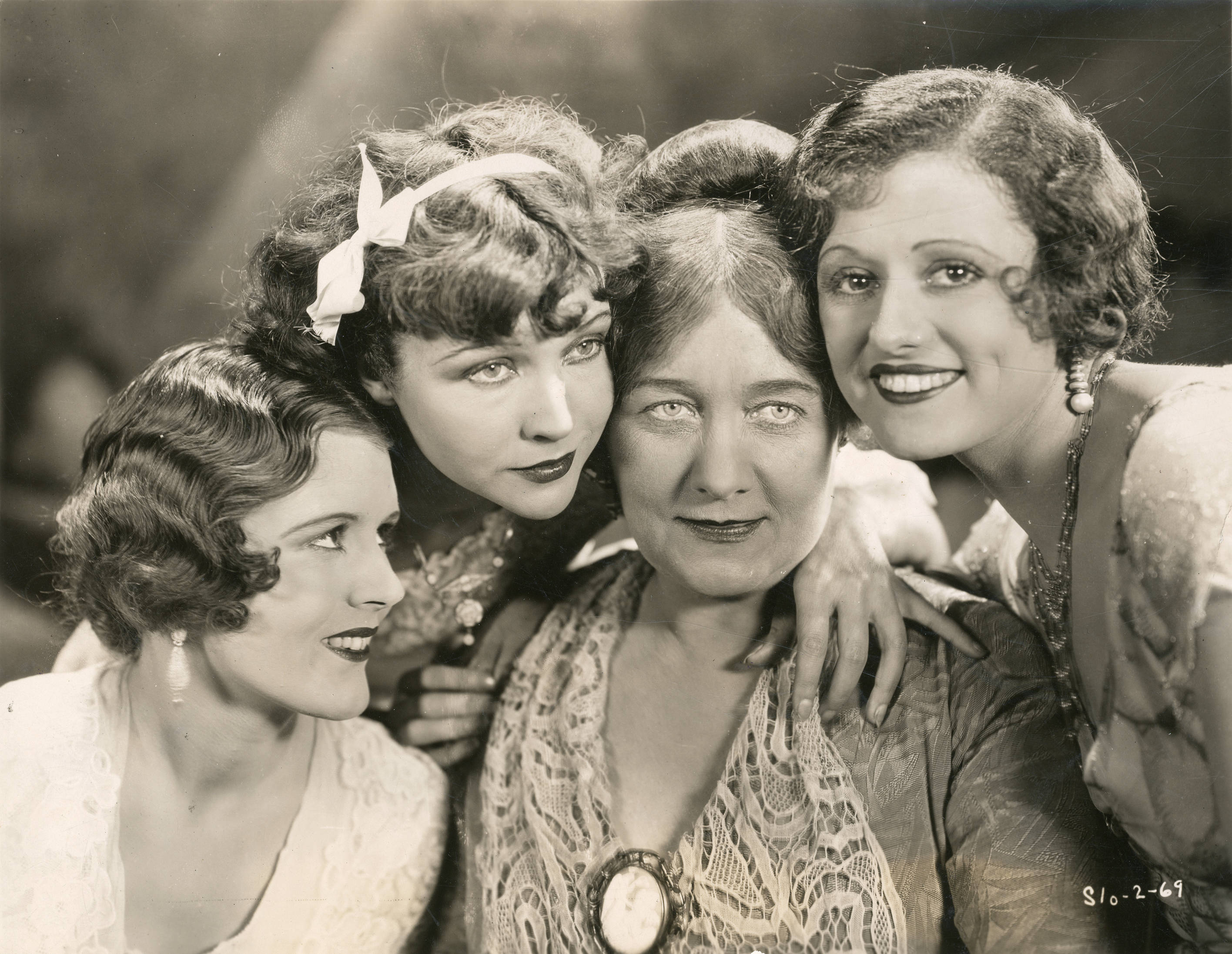
- Film still
- Directed by: Paul Sloane
- Written by: George S. Brooks (story & screenplay); Marion Orth (story & screenplay)
- Produced by: Fox Film Corporation
- Starring: Louise Dresser; Joyce Compton
- Cinematography: L. William O'Connell
- Music by: Peter Brunelli; George Lipschultz; Albert Hay Malotte
- Distributed by: Fox Film Corporation
- Release date: April 20, 1930
- Running time: 77 minutes
- Country: United States
- Language: English

The Three Sisters is a 1930 American pre-Code film directed by Paul Sloane and starring Louise Dresser, Tom Patricola, and Kenneth MacKenna. It was distributed by Fox Film Corporation five years before they would become Twentieth Century Fox. It is unknown whether a print of the film still exists.

== Plot ==
As described in a magazine film review, Carlotta, Antonia, and Elena are three sisters, the daughters of Marta. The three sisters suddenly marry and disappear from their home, Elena dying after giving birth to a son shortly after receiving news that her husband, the Count d'Amati, has died on the battlefield. Carlotta and her husband go to the United States where they prosper with a florist's shop, while the third sister Antonia marries her music teacher in Vienna. Through curious but plausible circumstances, Marta loses track of her two remaining daughters and must flee her home in Italy and go to Rome. There, d'Amati's parents succeed in obtaining legal guardianship of their grandson through a court order. Now alone, Marta's fate reduces her to washing dishes in a cheap restaurant. For reasons not clearly stated in the film, the American couple do not communicate directly with Marta, but instead give money to their friend Pasquale to deliver to her, which he pockets. After an unexpected reunion of the two remaining daughters in America, they return to Italy with their husbands and plenty of funds for a happy finish. They locate Marta who they thought was being taken care of as well as the villian Pasquale, the latter getting the works right in the street with a garbage cart dumped on him.

== Cast ==
- Louise Dresser as Marta
- Tom Patricola as Tony
- Kenneth MacKenna as Count d'Amati
- Joyce Compton as Carlotta
- June Collyer as Elena
- Addie McPhail as Antonia
- Cliff Saum as Pasquale (credited as Clifford Saum)
- Sidney De Gray as Tito
- John St. Polis as Judge
- Herman Bing as Von Kosch
- Dickie Moore (uncredited role as a child)
