= George S. Brooks =

American dramatist

George Sprague Brooks (1895–1961) was a playwright, writer, editor and lecturer whose work appeared frequently in the Saturday Evening Post.

== Early life ==
Born February 7, 1895, in Pearl Creek, New York, George S. Brooks was the great-great-grandson of Revolutionary War brigadier general and chaplain David Brooks. George S. Brooks attended Middleburg Academy, Salt Lake Collegiate Institute and the high school at Warsaw, New York. He then attended University of Rochester in fall 1931. He was friends with classics scholar James Marshall Campbell. The two had youthful plans of building a law practice together, but when Brooks failed the freshman English course he withdrew from college and pursued other career paths.

== World War I service ==
In 1914, he attempted to enlist in the Canadian Army. However, he was deported back to the United States for making a false declaration of citizenship. When the US entered World War I, he enlisted in 302nd Ammunition Train with the American Expeditionary Forces overseas, and became what is otherwise known as a "doughboy". He saw action in the Chateau-Thierry offensive, the Aisne offensive, and the Meuse-Argonne offensive. Brooks was one of a group of 249 American soldiers—both officers and enlisted men—who briefly attended the University of Poitiers as full-time students in 1919 after having fought on the Western Front. The University of Poitiers is one of France's oldest universities, founded in 1431. The Poitiers group was part of a larger experiment involving soldier-students at 15 other French universities as well as the Universities of London, Edinburgh, Oxford, and Cambridge. The experiment foreshadows later efforts on behalf of veterans' education such as the G.I. Bill of 1944 and subsequent programs.

== Career in journalism ==
After Poitiers, he held eleven different newspaper jobs before returning to Rochester. In 1922 he became a reporter for the Rochester Herald until 1925. Here he began collaborating on fiction pieces with correspondent and sketch-writer Henry Clune. S. S. McClure was impressed by Brooks’ Herald articles invited him to New York. Brooks became managing editor of McClure's. When the publication was bought by the Hearst Corporation, Brooks resigned. He became managing editor of Shrine Magazine. Whilst in New York, Brooks renewed his acquaintance with Walter Lister, the city editor of the New York Evening Post. With Lister, Brooks embarked on writing his first play.

== Spread Eagle and other plays ==
Initially titled Patriots, Inc., Brooks' and Lister's first play was produced by Jed Harris under the title, Spread Eagle and staged by George Abbott. It opened on Broadway on April 4, 1927, and ran for eighty performances. Raymond Massey, who starred as the Hearst-inspired Joe Cobb, directed the subsequent London production. It garnered mixed reviews. Long thought to be lost, the play was rediscovered in the basement of the 5th Avenue New York public library and was revived by the L.A. Theatre Works radio theatre company who made an audio recording of the play in 1999 with actors Fred Savage, Ed Asner and Sharon Gless.

Spread Eagle is shaped in part by Brooks’ experience in World War I, as well as criticism of the Hearst publications' jingoistic coverage of the Spanish–American War, and a plot which centers on fooling the American people into going to war on a false pretext when the real motive is to secure America's overseas business interests. Spread Eagle was subtitled “A Drama and A Fiction for Patriots”. The Federal Communications Commission (FCC) banned the work from radio.

The success of Spread Eagle led to re-write work on Celebrity by Willard Keefe and contributions to the less successful play Whip Hand by Marjorie Chase Surdez. In 1929, Brooks was contracted by Fox Film Company for six months. This engagement was extended to two years during which time he adapted his story of newspaper people For Two Cents into Big News (1929) starring Carole Lombard. The 1930 film The Three Sisters was adapted from his own original story, not from the Anton Chekhov play. Brooks's final work in Hollywood was the 1930 movie Double Cross Roads, which he adapted from the novel Yonder Grow The Daisies by William R. Lipman.

In 1922, Brooks married Dr. Helen Clark, professor of educational psychology at the University of Minnesota. He collaborated with her on his 1931 work Dead or Alive. The couple purchased a thirty-acre estate on the outskirts of Groton, New York, where they lived with their three children. Brooks concentrated on short stories in the latter part of his career. In 1926, he edited James Durand An Able Seaman Of 1812: His Adventures On Old Ironsides And As An Impressed Sailor In The British Navy. The George S. Brooks Papers are held at Syracuse University.

== Other works ==
1928 Fortinbras In Plain Clothes
1930 No Cause For Complaint
1936 Block That Bride and other stories
1942 The Mamma Bull
