= Howard Brothers =

American actor

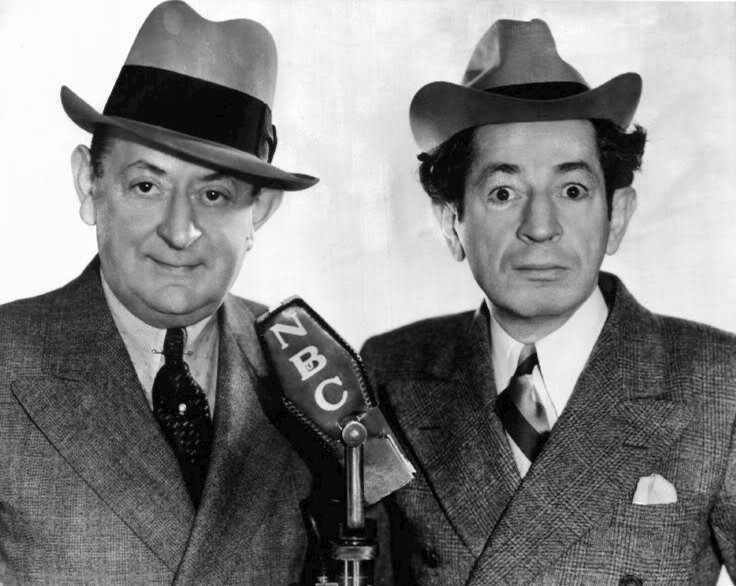
Eugene and Willie Howard promoting their Follies Bergere of the Air NBC radio show in 1936.

Willie Howard (April 13, 1883 – January 14, 1949) and Eugene Howard (July 7, 1880 – August 1, 1965), billed as the Howard Brothers, were Silesian-born American vaudeville performers of the first half of the 20th century. They were two of the earliest openly Jewish performers on the American stage.

After performing in amateur night competitions, the brothers began separate professional theatre careers. Soon they were appearing together in burlesque and vaudeville, where, over the course of a decade, they established their reputation. The brothers were hired by the Shubert family in 1912 to perform in a series of successful revues on Broadway over the next decade called The Passing Show. These were followed by another popular series of Broadway revues in the 1920s and 1930s called George White's Scandals. They appeared in a few additional Broadway musicals, notably Girl Crazy. In between these Broadway seasons, the brothers continued to be in great demand on the vaudeville circuit and made a few (mostly short) films. In the 1940s, Willie continued to star in revues and musicals and to perform in vaudeville and night clubs.

== Early life and career ==
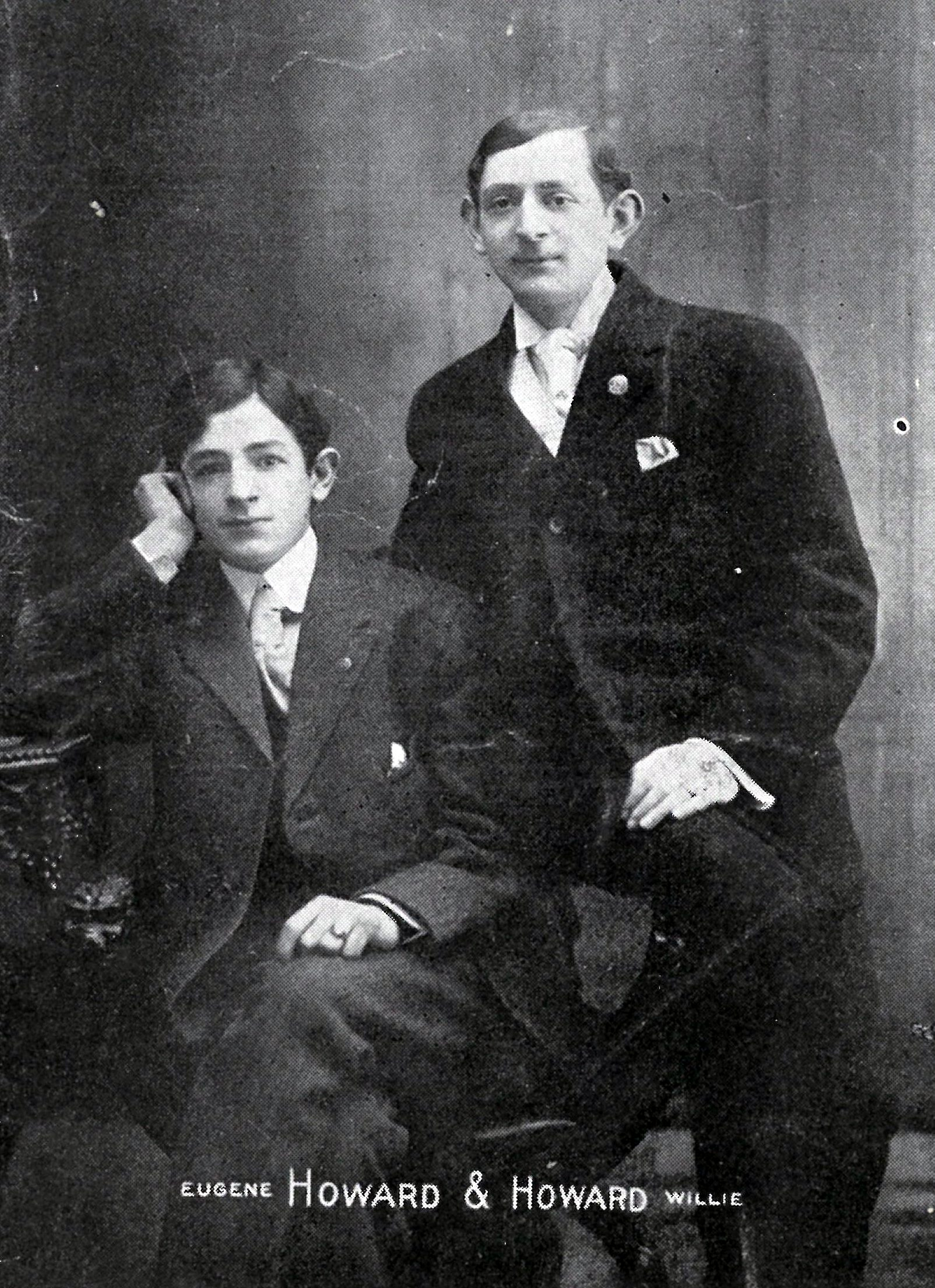
Willie (left) and Eugene (right) Howard in 1907

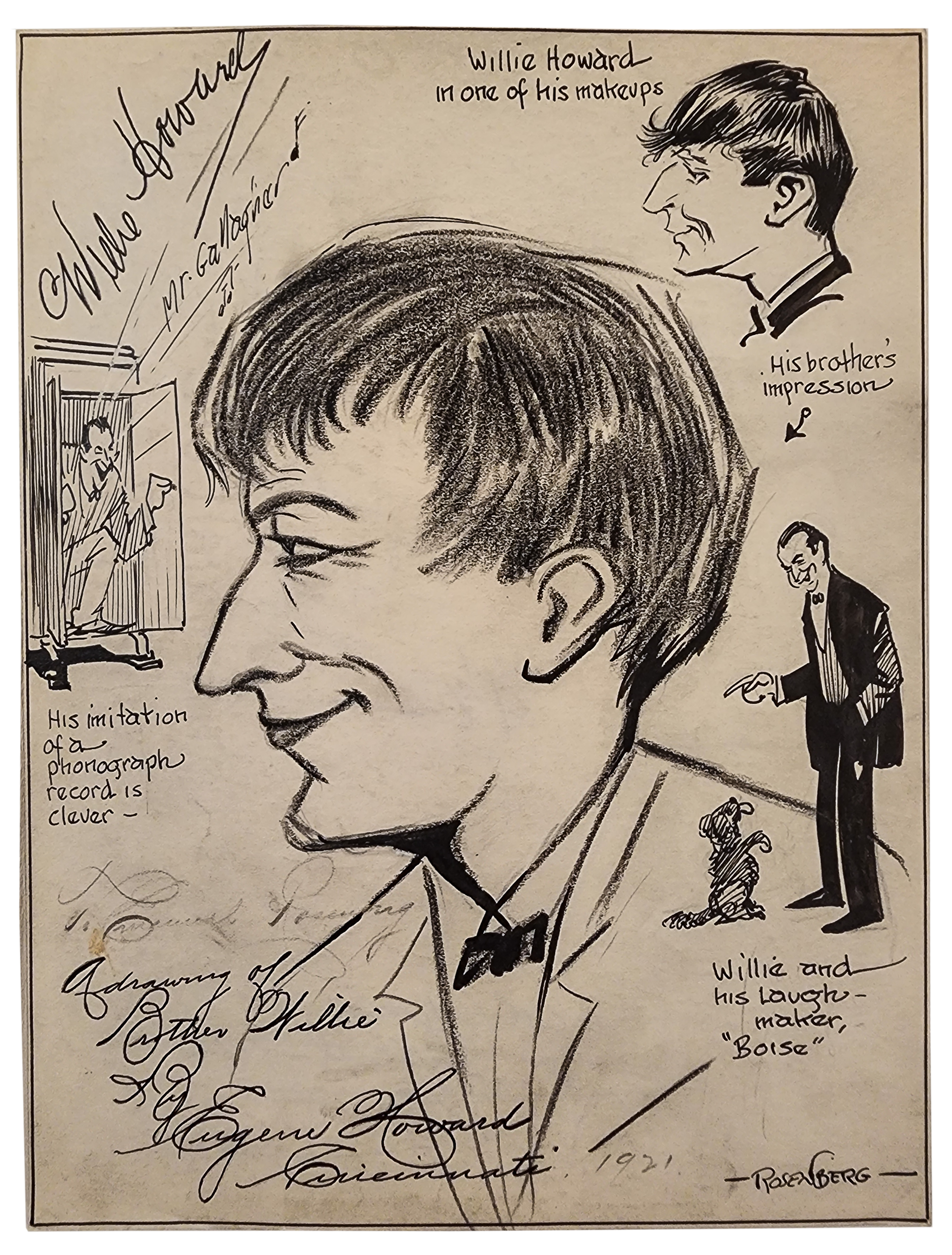
Signed sketch by Manuel Rosenberg 1921

Isidore and Wilhelm Levkowitz were born in Neustadt in the German part of Silesia to Leopold Levkowitz and his second wife, Pauline (née Glass), two of six children (three boys and three girls). The family immigrated to New York City and settled in Harlem about 1886. Their father was a Jewish cantor, who taught his sons to sing, hoping that they would follow his profession. However, both boys became intrigued by performing. The brothers, especially Willie, performed at amateur night shows at local burlesque houses. Their father was disappointed with their performing activity. He wanted Eugene to be a doctor and worried about Willie because he misbehaved in school. Their father changed his attitude when he saw them achieve success and even asked them for advice on how to get into show business.

Eugene studied business but decided to go on the stage. In his earliest attempts at performing, he billed himself as "Harry Lee, phenomenal boy tenor". His first professional theatre job, in 1900, was in the chorus of a Broadway musical, A Million Dollars. Upon being hired and hearing his name, the manager suggested that "Eugene Howard" would be a more suitable name, and Isidore adopted it permanently. Later that year, he had a small role in a Broadway play based on Quo Vadis. Next, he was in the chorus of The Strollers, and, in 1902, he was one of the Portuguese Twins in a tour of the musical The Belle of New York. Meanwhile, Willie had his first engagement in 1897 singing in the gallery of Lyon Palace on 110th Street as a boy soprano. He was hired in 1900 as a song-plugger to sing from the balcony at Proctor's 125th Street Theatre as he distributed water to customers. He did this while attending school, and had to leave early to make the 3:15 pm show. He soon was engaged to do the same during out-of-town performances of The Little Duchess (1901), but he was dismissed after the opening night, as his voice had begun to change. To compensate for the temporary loss of his singing voice, he began doing impersonations and started using the stage name Willie Howard. At one point in that formative year of 1901, he considered taking up boxing and appeared briefly as "Kid Lefko." He attended Cooper Union college.

Eugene and Willie then performed briefly with their middle brother, later known as Sam Howard, as Harry Lee (Eugene) and the Lee Brothers, playing in restaurants and museums. Eugene and Willie, in 1902, along with a friend, Thomas Potter Dunne, formed an act called "The Messenger Boys Trio". One sketch that they wrote was called "The Messenger Boy and the Thespian"; even after Dunne left the act, Willie and Eugene continued to perform this routine. Eugene and Willie built their reputation in vaudeville over the next decade, often billed as the Howard Brothers. They wrote a sketch that they toured widely, early on, called "The Porter and the Salesman". After a few years together, the brothers were earning high fees on the Orpheum circuit, and young Willie became the acknowledged leader of the act.

== Vaudeville act and comic style ==
Willie (left) and Eugene Howard in 1926

The brothers generally played wisecracking caricatures, using Jewish dialect humor, opera parodies (with Eugene as the tenor and Willie as the baritone), and rapid-fire comedy crosstalk. Diminutive, wild-haired, slumping Willie often portrayed a troublesome servant, such as a waiter or a bellhop, while well-fed, well-dressed Eugene, the straight man, played a self-satisfied authority figure, such as a manager, businessman or a customer. Willie assayed foreign accents, such as Spanish, Scottish, French, Russian, and Chinese, but always laced with his Yiddish dialect, and also did impressions of popular vocalists, such as George Jessel, Al Jolson, Gallagher and Shean, and Eddie Cantor. Their most famous comic routines "included 'French Taught in a Hurry' in which [they] did rapid doubletalk; 'Quartets from Rigoletto' [a parody], which [they] would perform with large, buxom ladies ([with Willie] stealing glances at their breasts the whole time); and 'Comes the Revolution', in which [Willie] would play a radical agitator" on a soapbox and Eugene would play a heckler. Variety magazine said of their act, "there is never a dull moment" and praised Eugene's "straighting" as well as Willie's gags. Of the brothers' approach to their work, Willie said:

[A]ll fun-making must be well grounded and serious in its conception, and it is this basic seriousness of fun that leads to the best laugh production, which, after all, is the final test of all humor, on stage or off. In proof of this, you will notice that any good comedian always maintains a serious expression on his face, no matter how funny his lines may be; for let the actor realize that his lines are funny and laugh at them, ever so little, himself, and his audience immediately will freeze up. Consequently, in my impersonations, for example, I seriously study the person I wish to imitate and rehearse the impersonation many times in the serious vein, before I even attempt to give it a humorous twist. Then I try to insert the humor while still in the character of the person I am portraying. Thus, the basis of actuality is given to the impersonation.

== Broadway and later years ==
Beginning in 1912, in between their vaudeville bookings, the brothers performed in Broadway shows, especially revues, including the Shuberts' series The Passing Show at the Winter Garden Theatre and later the George White's Scandals series. An early review in Variety magazine commented: "The Howards never fail to become a riot at the Garden", and George Jessel later said that Willie was "The best of all the revue comics, bar none." A review in The New York Times said: "Next to Al Jolson, Willie Howard is now the foremost of the Winter Garden entertainers." Willie appeared opposite the 19-year-old Ginger Rogers in the Gershwin musical, Girl Crazy, in 1930–1931. The brothers' Broadway shows were:

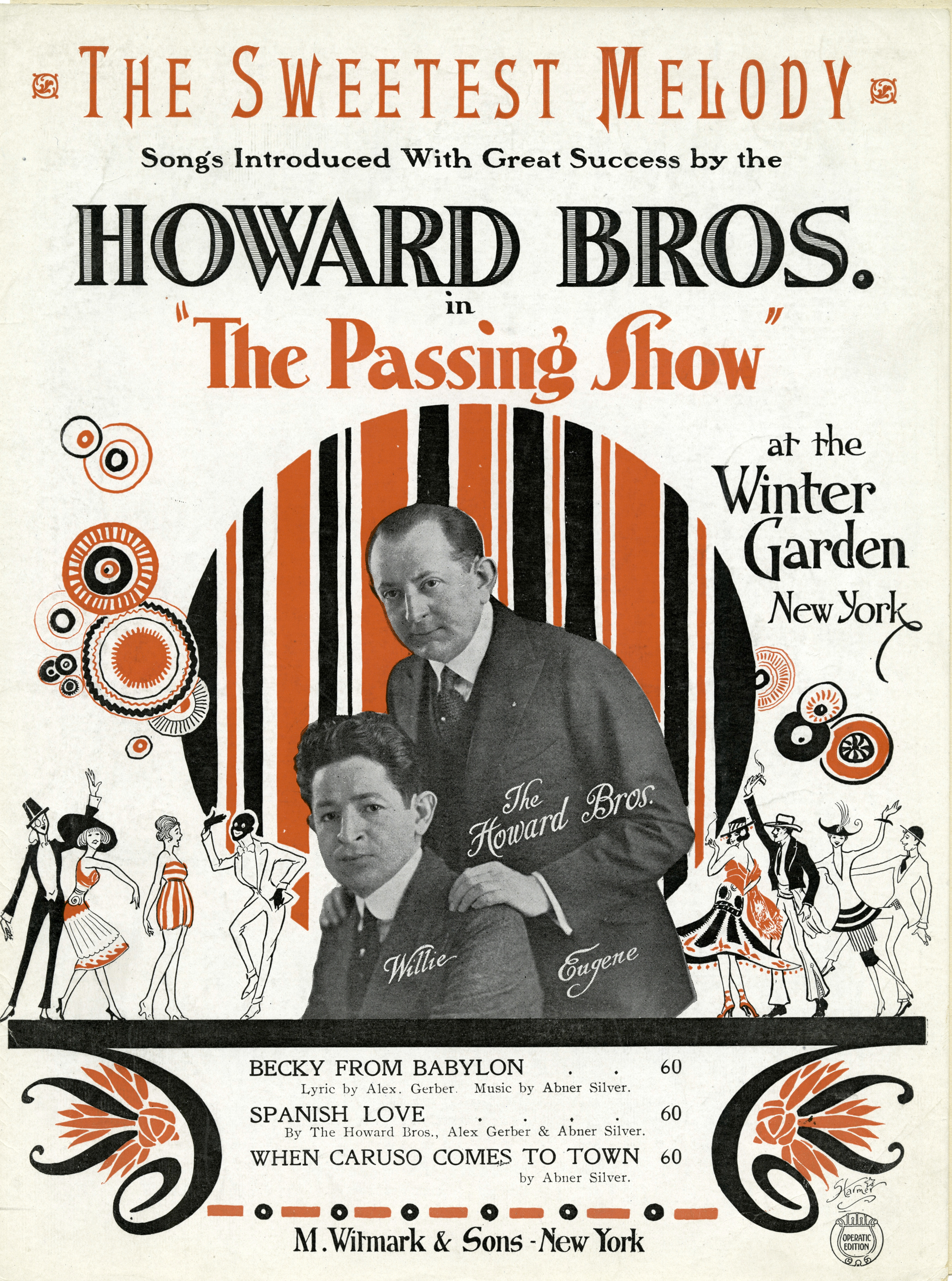
The Howard Brothers on the cover of sheet music for the song "The Sweetest Melody" by Abner Silver, from The Passing Show of 1921

- The Passing Show of 1912 (revue)
- The Whirl of the World (1914 revue) – Willie played his signature character, Sammy Meyers. Eugene played the Steward of the Amber Club and the Captain of "La France", among other characters
- The Passing Show of 1915 (revue)
- The Show of Wonders (1916–1917 revue)– Willie played Sammy, among other characters. Eugene played Aladdin, among others
- The Passing Show of 1918 (revue)
- The Passing Show of 1921 (revue) – Willie played Sammy, and the brothers performed their "Rigoletto Quartette"
- The Passing Show of 1922 (revue)
- Sky High (1925 musical) – an American adaptation of the 1922 British musical Whirled into Happiness, produced by the Shuberts as a vehicle for Willie. Willie played Sammy, and Eugene was one of the producers. Like all of their early shows for the Shuberts, the piece was a success, running for more than six months.
- George White's Scandals 1926 (revue)
- George White's Scandals 1928 (revue)
- George White's Scandals 1929 (revue)
- Girl Crazy (1930–1931 musical) – Willie played Gieber Goldfarb in this successful musical, but Eugene did not perform in this.
- Ballyhoo of 1932 (musical) – the brothers each played several characters.
- George White's Music Hall Varieties (1932 revue)
- Ziegfeld Follies of 1934 (revue) – Willie played a revolutionary and a secretary, among others, while Eugene played a manager, a mayor, etc.
- George White's Scandals 1936 (revue)
- Bet Your Life (1937 play) – this play, co-written by Willie, closed in a week.
- The Show Is On (1937 revue) – this piece was also short-lived.
- George White's Scandals 1939 (revue)

== Willie Howard on his own ==
Eugene retired in 1940 to manage Willie and write material for him, although he occasionally appeared with him even afterwards. After Eugene's retirement, Willie usually used Al Kelly as his sidekick. Willie performed in several more Broadway shows, touring shows for the Shuberts and Mike Todd, and in night clubs.

Willie's last Broadway shows were:

- Crazy with the Heat (1941 revue) – Willie co-starred with singers Gracie Barrie and Luella Gear, with his scenes "under supervision of Eugene Howard"; despite the star names in the cast, the show ran only three months.
- Priorities of 1942 (revue) – Willie starred in this successful vaudeville-style show that lasted nearly a year.
- My Dear Public (1943 musical) – Willie played Barney Short in this short-lived musical.
- Sally (1948 revival) – Willie played the Duke of Czechogovinia in this revival of the popular 1920s musical.
- Along Fifth Avenue (1949) – During the try-out of this show at the Forrest Theatre in Philadelphia, Willie had to withdraw due to illness. He died one day after the show opened on Broadway.

== Motion pictures ==
The Howard Brothers also made several short films together, including Between the Acts at the Opera (1926, one of the earliest Vitaphone talking pictures), The Music Makers (1929), and I'm Telling You (1931). They also starred in In a Theater Manager's Office (1927)

When Educational Pictures transferred its activities to its New York studio in 1937, its star comedian Buster Keaton declined to relocate from the west coast, leaving Educational without a name comedian for the new season. The New York-based Willie Howard was signed, and he made several short comedies in which he appeared as the hapless Frenchman Pierre Ginsbairge, complete with beret, mustache, and goatee. This ridiculous characterization was received enthusiastically by trade critics and theater owners. The financially troubled studio suspended operations in mid-1938 and closed in early 1939.

Willie's final film appearances, produced in 1941 for the Soundies movie jukeboxes, were three-minute shorts filmed in New York. Most were comic songs (like "Tyrone Shapiro, the Bronx caballero") but some were spoken-comedy routines including two with Pierre Ginsbairge: How to See a French Doctor and How to Go to a French Restaurant. Comes the Revolution was revived, with Al Kelly standing in for Eugene Howard.

== Reputation ==
Marlon Brando was a huge fan of Willie Howard. He told Lawrence Grobel in his 1979 Playboy interview that, as a young actor in New York, he used to go see Willie and laugh so loudly, Howard began to play to him. According to columnist Bob Thomas, who wrote a biography of Brando, "...[Brando] always cited the old Broadway comic to categorize low comedy."

== Willie Howard's recordings ==
Willie Howard made several recordings:

- "My Yiddish Momme" (1925)
- "The Barber of Seville" (from Sky High) (1925)
- "Let It Rain" (from Sky High) (1925)
- Willie Howard as Professor Pierre Marquette (with Al Kelly, and Ruby Melnick's Orchestra)

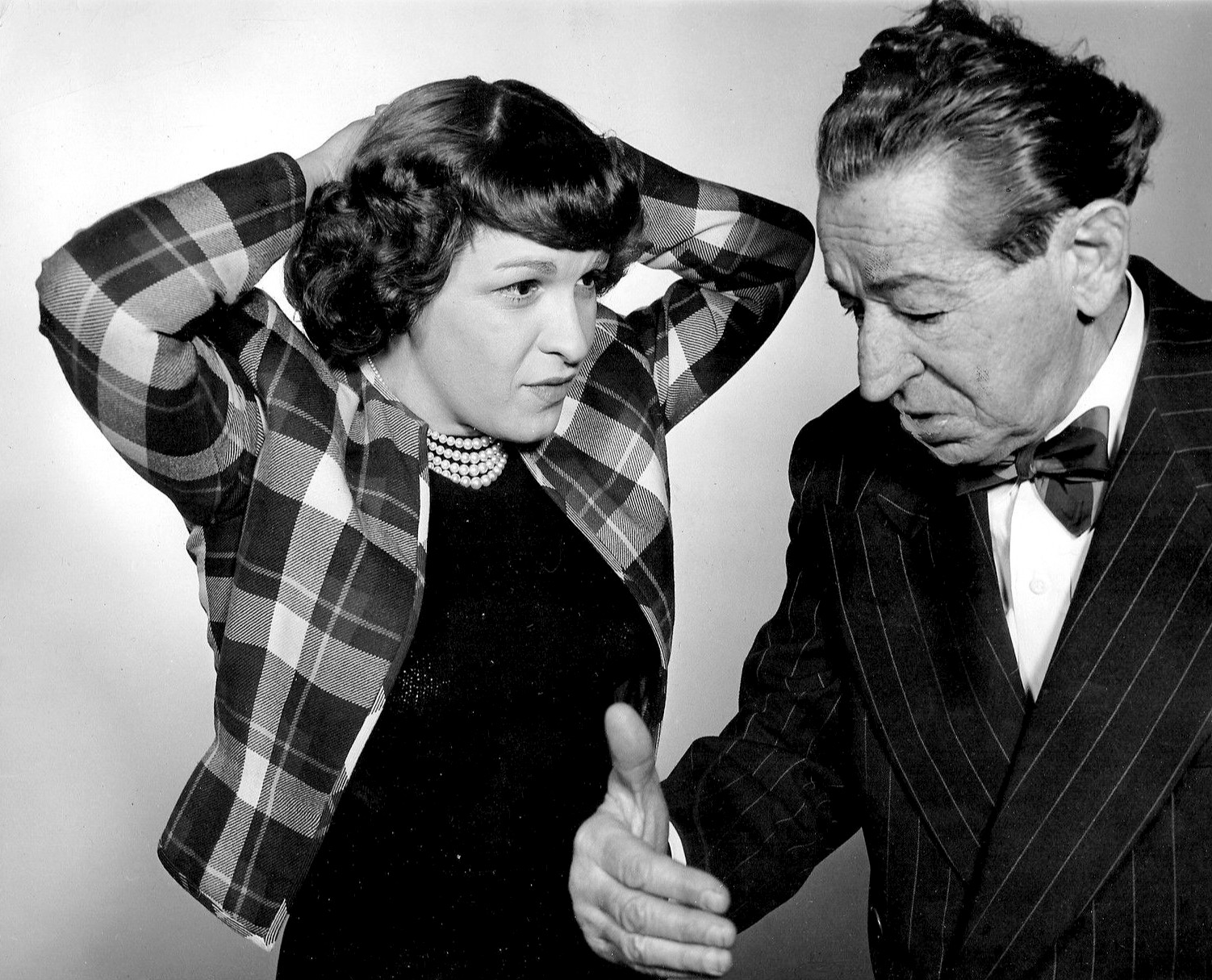
Willie Howard and Nancy Walker in a 1948 publicity photo for Along Fifth Avenue

- "Salty-Saul-Peter" (with Ruby Melnick's Orchestra)
- Willie Howard in an Album of Comedy and Songs (1942; includes "French Taught in a Hurry", "Tyrone Shapiro", "the Bronx Caballero", "Moscow Art Players", "Comes the Revolution!", and imitations of George Jessel, Al Jolson and Eddie Cantor)

== Deaths ==
Willie had been suffering a liver ailment for six weeks and became ill during a Philadelphia tryout for the Broadway-bound show Along Fifth Avenue. He died the day before the show opened in New York, in 1949, at the age of 65. He was survived by his widow Emily (née Miles). They had no children. He is buried in Paramus, New Jersey, in Cedar Park Cemetery, Emerson.

Eugene, who had been living in Jackson Heights, Queens, died in 1965 at Park West Hospital, in New York City, aged 84. He was predeceased by his wife, Maud (née Fisher) of London, whom he had married in 1910, who died in 1964.
