= Isabella Patricola =

American vaudeville performer

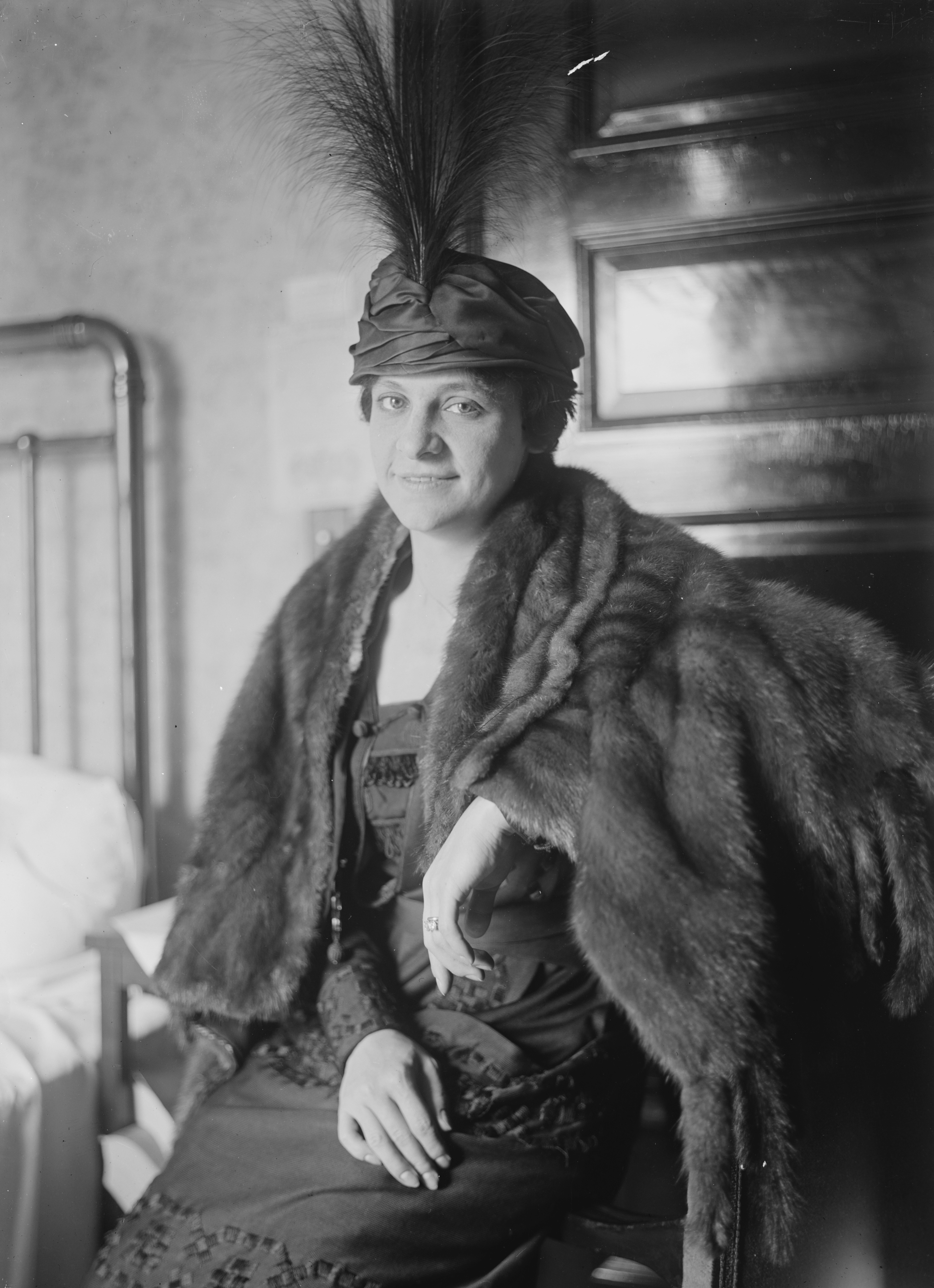
- Miss Patricola, c.1920
- Born: June 19, 1888; Palermo, Sicily, Italy
- Died: May 23, 1965 (aged 76); Manhasset, New York, U.S.
- Other name: Miss Patricola
- Occupations: Singer; violinist; entertainer
- Years active: 1894-1935

Isabella Patricola (June 19, 1888 – May 23, 1965), known professionally as Miss Patricola or simply Patricola, was an Italian-American vaudeville singer and entertainer popular in the late 1910s and 1920s.

== Life and career ==
Although some sources give her year of birth as 1886, her passport application indicates that she was born in Palermo, Sicily, on June 19, 1888, the daughter of a musician, Louis Patricola. The family emigrated to the United States in 1889, living first in New Orleans, where her brother Tom Patricola was born, before moving to Great Falls, Montana. She learned to play violin as a young child, and was described as a musical prodigy when she performed in Great Falls in 1894. She toured western Canada with her father in 1899, and continued to perform with members of her family until 1903.

That year, she married Ernest H. Allen, and settled with him in Chicago, where their son was born in 1905. She returned to performing a few years later, and by about 1912 was performing regularly at Morse's Garden and then at the renamed Green Mill Gardens, where she was the headline entertainer. She was known for singing, dancing, and playing the violin at the same time, and one reviewer wrote that she was an "exceptionally clever entertainer [with] a charming personality [and] a resonant and sweet voice." By 1915, she was performing in front of an orchestra of up to 25 musicians, together with a chorus.

In 1916, the impresario Alexander Pantages signed her to tour in the Western United States and Canada. She also appeared on stage increasingly frequently in New York City, and was praised for her style, dressing with elegance, and performing with "a brilliant, magnetic energy that sets your heart to dancing and your nerves to tingling with ecstasy", according to a contemporary critic in the Houston Post. She sang popular songs of the time, including "coon songs", novelty songs, ragtime, and Irish and Italian melodies, "with appropriate music, words and movements, wiggles, etc.".

By 1918, she was described as one of America’s most popular and highest-paid vaudeville artists, and she became a regular opening act at the Palace Theatre on Broadway, returning there several times during the 1920s. Her stage appearances billed her in such terms as "The Queen of the Cabaret" and "The Shining Star of Vaudeville". Between 1919 and 1929, she also made many recordings for the Edison, Pathe, Victor, and Vocalion labels, as well as two Home-Talkie films in which she sings and plays her violin while accompanied by Abel Baer.

She divorced Ernest Allen and married Walter Morris in 1927. Over the following years she withdrew from performance, perhaps because her popularity was fading. She retired in 1935 and opened a successful "Hygienic Phone Service" business with her husband.

She died of a stroke in 1965, in Manhasset, New York.
