= Dancing Lady =

1933 musical film by Robert Z. Leonard

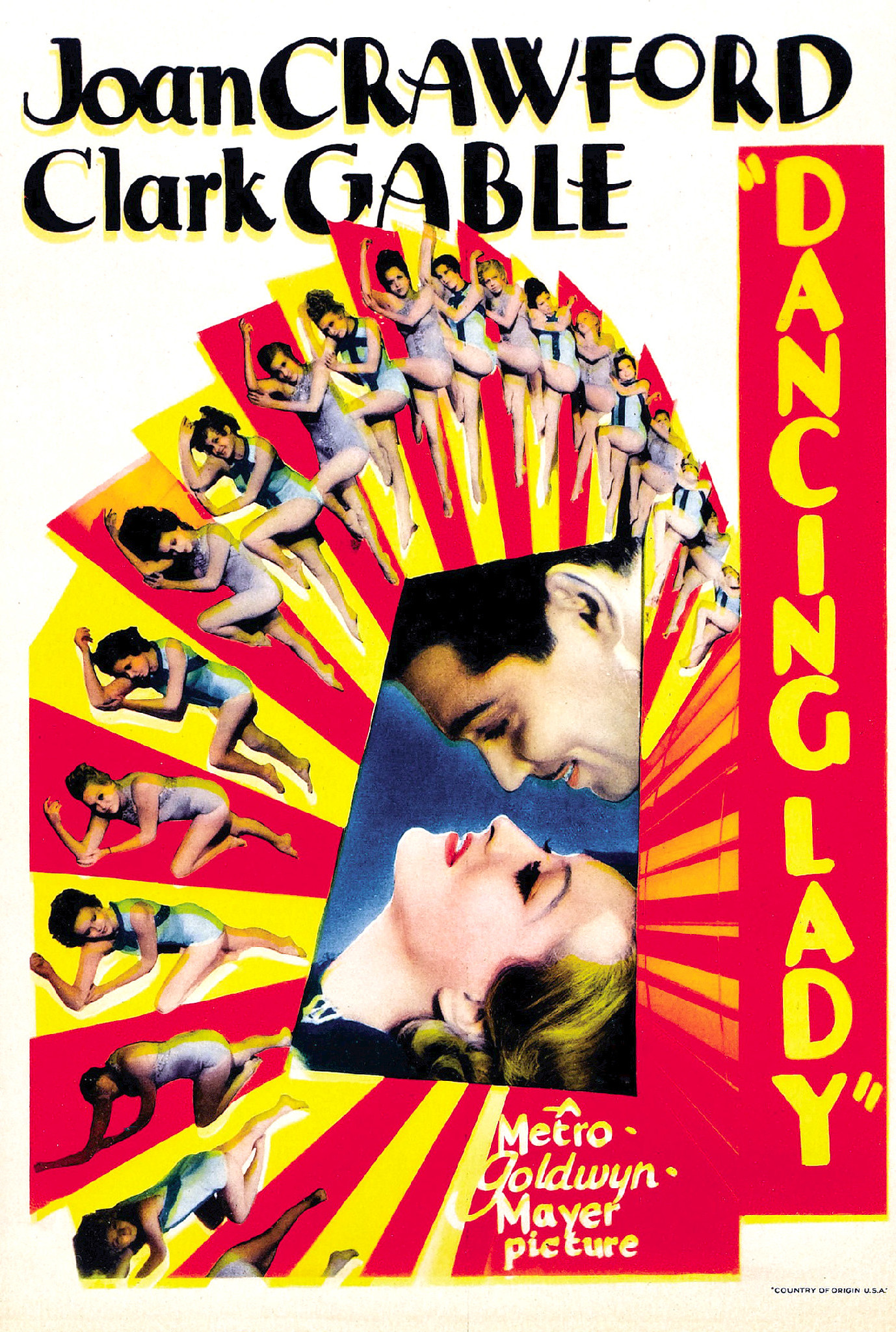
- Theatrical release poster
- Directed by: Robert Z. Leonard
- Written by: Allen Rivkin; P.J. Wolfson; Uncredited: Robert Benchley; Zelda Sears
- Based on: Dancing Lady; 1932 novel by James Warner Bellah
- Produced by: John W. Considine Jr.
- Starring: Joan Crawford; Clark Gable
- Cinematography: Oliver T. Marsh
- Edited by: Margaret Booth
- Music by: Louis Silvers
- Production company: Metro-Goldwyn-Mayer
- Distributed by: Loew's, Inc.
- Release date: November 24, 1933
- Running time: 90 minutes
- Country: United States
- Language: English
- Budget: $923,000
- Box office: $2.4 million

Dancing Lady is a 1933 American pre-Code musical film starring Joan Crawford and Clark Gable, and featuring Franchot Tone, Fred Astaire, Robert Benchley, and Ted Healy and his Stooges (later the Three Stooges). The picture was directed by Robert Z. Leonard, produced by John W. Considine Jr., and based on the novel of the same name by James Warner Bellah, published the previous year. The movie had a hit song in "Everything I Have Is Yours" by Burton Lane and Harold Adamson.

The film features the screen debut of dancer Fred Astaire, who appears as himself, as well as the first credited film appearance of Nelson Eddy, and an early feature film appearance of the Three Stooges' best-known lineup—Moe, Curly, and Larry—in support of the leader of their act at the time, Ted Healy, whose role in the film is considerably larger than theirs. Algonquin Round Table humorist Robert Benchley plays a supporting role.

In the original film, Larry Fine completes a jigsaw puzzle, only to discover to his disgust that it is a picture of Adolf Hitler. This was ordered removed by the Production Code censors before the film was released to theaters, because they claimed it was an insult to a foreign head of state. The scene was restored to the TV release, but not to the video release.

The film will enter the American public domain on January 1, 2029. (Note: Under R267077.)

== Plot ==
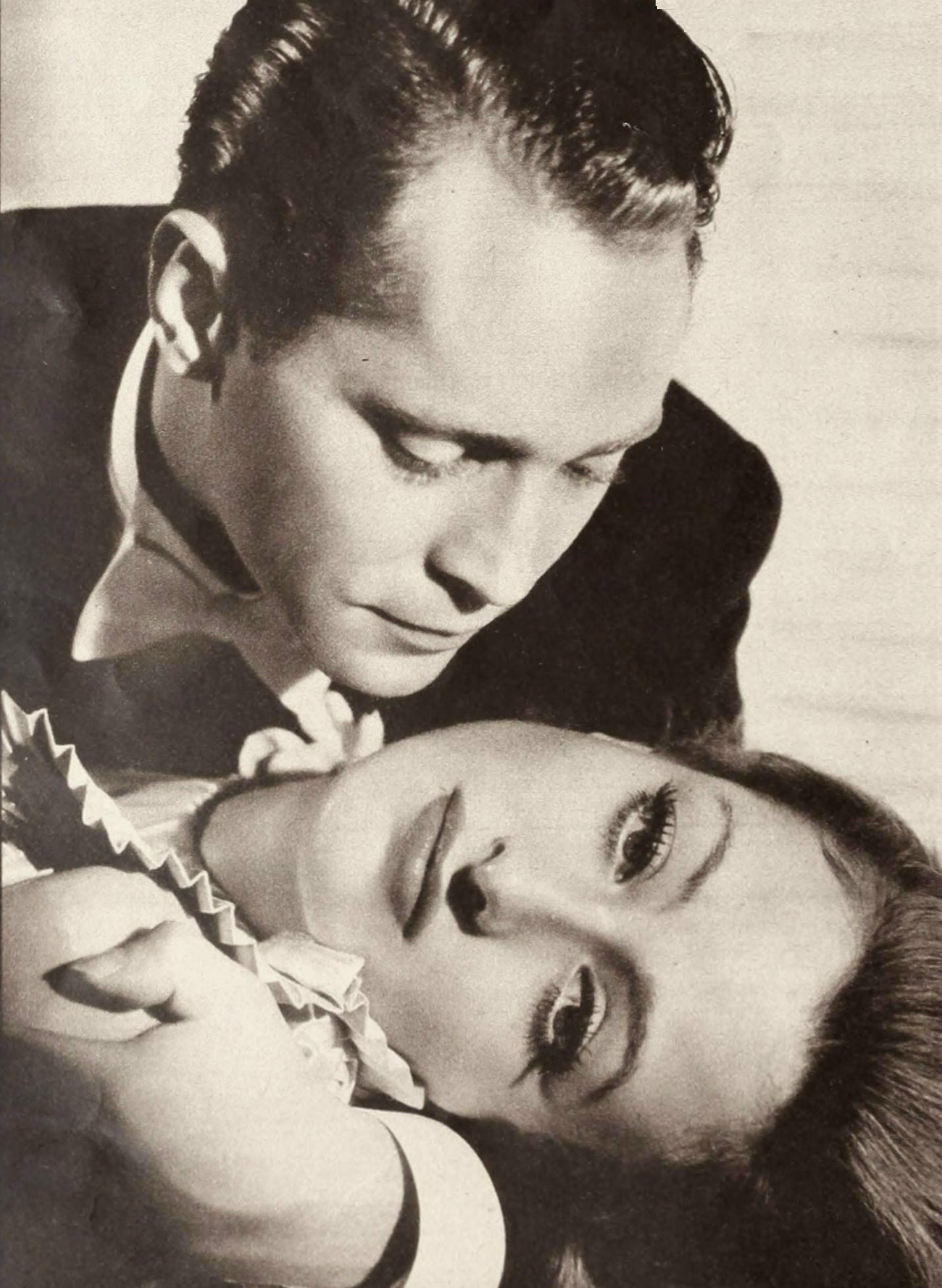
Franchot Tone and Joan Crawford in Dancing Lady

Janie Barlow, a young dancer initially relegated to performing striptease in a burlesque show, encounters a significant turn of events when she is arrested for indecent exposure. Her predicament takes a fortuitous turn, though, as she is bailed out by Tod Newton, a wealthy socialite who was captivated by her while attending the theater with his elite circle.

Motivated by his attraction to Janie, Tod intervenes in her career aspirations, leveraging his financial influence to secure her a role in a Broadway musical under the direction of Patch Gallagher. Initially hesitant due to artistic considerations, Patch ultimately relents upon witnessing Janie's exceptional dancing abilities.

As Janie's talent propels her from a chorus role to a leading part, replacing Vivian Warner, Tod's romantic ambitions become conflicted. Fearing the loss of Janie's affection should she achieve stardom, Tod orchestrates the closure of the show, leaving Janie unemployed, but upon discovering Tod's manipulative actions, Janie severs ties with him and aligns herself with Patch, her newfound romantic interest and benefactor.

With Patch's financial support and Janie's talent, they resurrect the show, which garners immense success. This narrative of perseverance, betrayal, and ultimate triumph underscores the transformative journey of Janie from an aspiring dancer to a celebrated star of the stage.

== Cast ==
- Joan Crawford as Janie "Duchess" Barlow
- Clark Gable as Patch Gallagher
- Franchot Tone as Tod Newton
- May Robson as Dolly Todhunter
- Winnie Lightner as Rosette LaRue
- Fred Astaire as himself
- Robert Benchley as Ward King
- Art Jarrett as himself
- Grant Mitchell as Jasper Bradley, Sr.
- Ted Healy as Steve, Patch's assistant
- Moe Howard as Moe, a stagehand
- Curly Howard as Curly, a stagehand
- Larry Fine as Harry, a pianist
- Nelson Eddy as himself
- Maynard Holmes as Jasper Bradley, Jr.
- Sterling Holloway as Pinky
- Gloria Foy as Vivian Warner
- Eve Arden as Marcia, the Southern Actress (uncredited)

== Reception ==
Dancing Lady was a box-office hit upon its release and drew mostly positive reviews from critics. Mordaunt Hall in The New York Times wrote, "It is for the most part quite a lively affair.... The dancing of Fred Astaire and Miss Crawford is most graceful and charming. The photographic effects of their scenes are an impressive achievement....Miss Crawford takes her role with no little seriousness."

== Box office ==
According to MGM records, the film earned $1,490,000 in the US and Canada and $916,000 elsewhere, resulting in a profit of $744,000.

== See also ==
- The Three Stooges filmography
