= Florenz Tamara =

American dancer

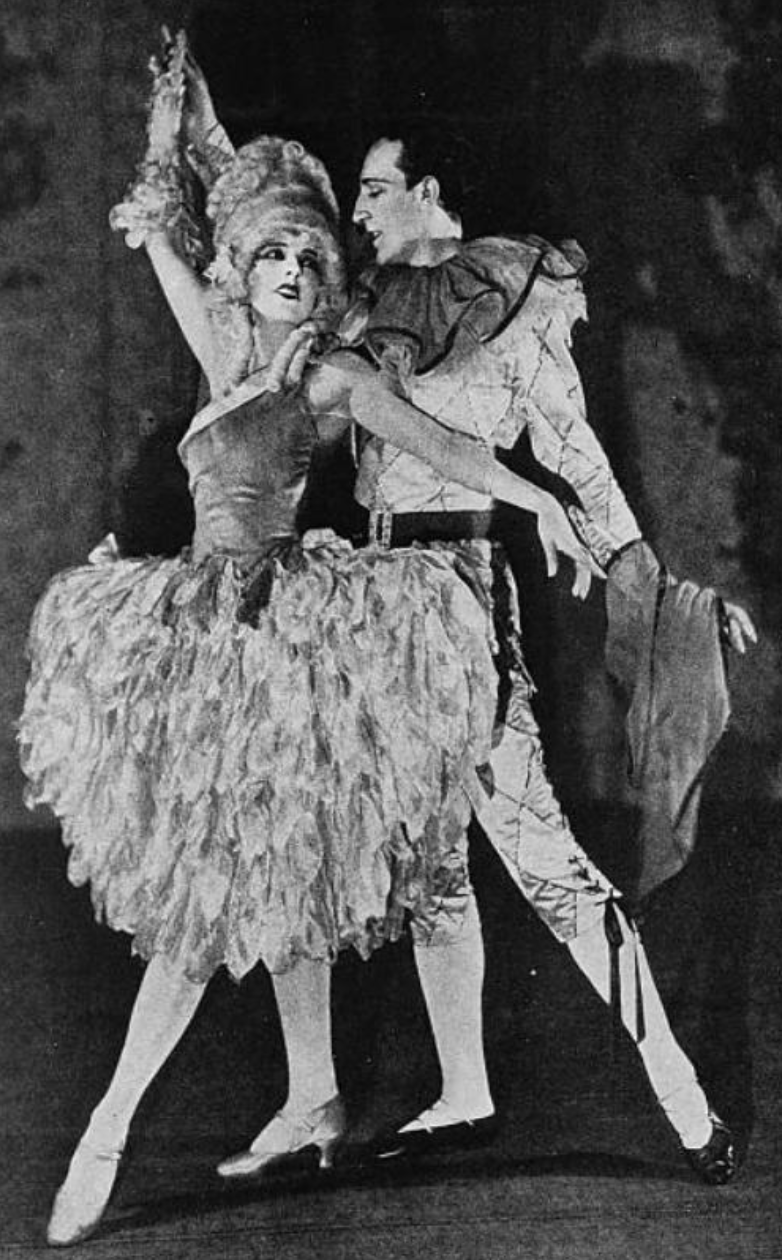
- Fowler & Tamara, as they appeared in George White's Scandals (1926)
- Born: Florence Gustave; May 12, 1898
- Died: December 31, 1947 (aged 49)
- Occupation: Dancer
- Spouse: Addison Fowler

Florenz Tamara (May 12, 1898 – December 31, 1947), also known as Florence E. Fowler, was an American dancer in the 1920s and 1930s. She was the professional partner and wife of Addison Fowler; they performed as the tango and modern dance team Fowler & Tamara.

== Early life ==
Florenz Tamara gave Chicago as her birthplace on travel documents and census forms, but she was usually described as being from San Francisco, or possibly Oakland, with the original name Florence Gustave. She explained that she was a "delicate" child who was encouraged to study dance as exercise.

== Career ==
Florence Gustave danced in southern California as a young woman, paired with Jack Holland. Beginning about 1921, the "fancy and eccentric" dance act of Fowler & Tamara were known for their tango, foxtrot, and modern dance performances. Individually she was also known as a toe dancer. In 1924 the pair danced on stage to a radio broadcast, when the orchestra failed to appear for their performance at Aeolian Hall. Her Broadway credits include performances in Zelda Sears' musical comedy Lollipop (1924) and the revue George White's Scandals (1926-1927). They toured in the United States and internationally through the 1920s and 1930s.

Newspapers carried descriptions of Tamara's costumes, pets, and shopping, and her advice on posture and "perfect carriage". A 1938 review found them past their prime, describing their program as an "inept exhibition." After they retired from full-time performing, Fowler and Tamara opened a dance school in Providence, Rhode Island.

== Personal life ==
In 1930, in London, Florenz Tamara married her dance partner, Ernest Addison "Jack" Fowler. She died in 1947; her husband died in 1957. Her scrapbook and some of her costumes are in the collection of the Lake County Museum in California.
