= The Century Girl =

1916 musical comedy revue

- Music: Victor Herbert and Irving Berlin
- Lyrics: Henry Blossom and Irving Berlin
- Premiere: November 6, 1916: Century Theatre

The Century Girl is a musical comedy revue with music by Victor Herbert and Irving Berlin, and lyrics by Henry Blossom and Berlin.

It opened November 6, 1916, at the Century Theatre on Broadway and ran until April 28, 1917, totaling 200 performances. Rather than having a cohesive plot, the show was a mixture of musical and vaudeville performances.

== Production ==
Charles Dillingham and Florenz Ziegfeld Jr. produced the show. Staging was by Edward Royce, Leon Errol, and Ned Wayburn, with set design by Joseph Urban. Max Hoffman directed the orchestra.

The show had a runtime of over four hours. On its opening night, the show began at 8:25pm and ended at 12:58am. This was actually an improvement from the show's time prior to its premiere. It had originally been scheduled to open on October 16, but was delayed in order to cut down the show while maintaining the lineup of actors and performers. Cuts continued to be made after the premiere, resulting in several actors, including Marie Dressler, being let go.

Performances included a "Stone Age romance", an Alice in Wonderland musical number, a number featuring animals and hunters, and a skit with actors portraying Herbert and Berlin.

The Century Girl was the only successful show produced at the Century Theatre (previously the New Theatre). After the show's closure, the theatre was sold and later demolished, being replaced by the Century Apartments.

== Cast ==
	1916 Broadway
Huntress/Columbine	Billie Allen
Emil Klutz	Sam Bernard
Eva Brown/Lame Duck	Hazel Dawn
Victor Herbert/Lion	Arthur Cunningham
Will B. Rich/County Constable	James Doyle
Wood B. Rich/County Constable	Harland Dixon
The Diver/Waldorf Dryginsku	Leon Errol
Jack of Diamonds	Marion Fairbanks
Jack of Clubs	Madeline Fairbanks
Hunter/Howell Lauder	Irving Fisher
Chicken/Peggy O'Brien	Elsie Janis
Huntress/Harlequin/Queen Mermaid	Vera Maxwell
Catherine of Russia/American Gold/the Philippines	Margaret Morris
Irving Berlin/Fox	John Slavin
King of Hearts	Lilyan Tashman
Messenger	Frankie Bailey
Anna Pavloafer	Sam Barndooroff
Marie Young	Jane Bliss
Dormouse	Dorothea Camden
Joker	Clara Carroll
Helen of Troy/Spanish Lace	Marjorie Cassidy
Barbara Fritchie/Irish Lace/Porto Rico	Evelyn Conway
Cleopatra/French Lace	Semone D'Herlys
Queen of Spades	Ethel Donaldson
Ace of Hearts/English Lace	Martha Erlich
Marie Antoinette/King of Clubs	Flo Hart
Mike Debitesky	Harry Kelloski
Turkey	Cathryne Rowe Palmer
Alice	Yvonne Shelton
Queen of Clubs	Katherine Kohler
Queen Boadicea/Alaska/Belgian Lace	May Leslie
Hawaii/Joan of Arc/American Silver	Hazel Lewis
Tiger Butler	Gus Minton

== Songs ==
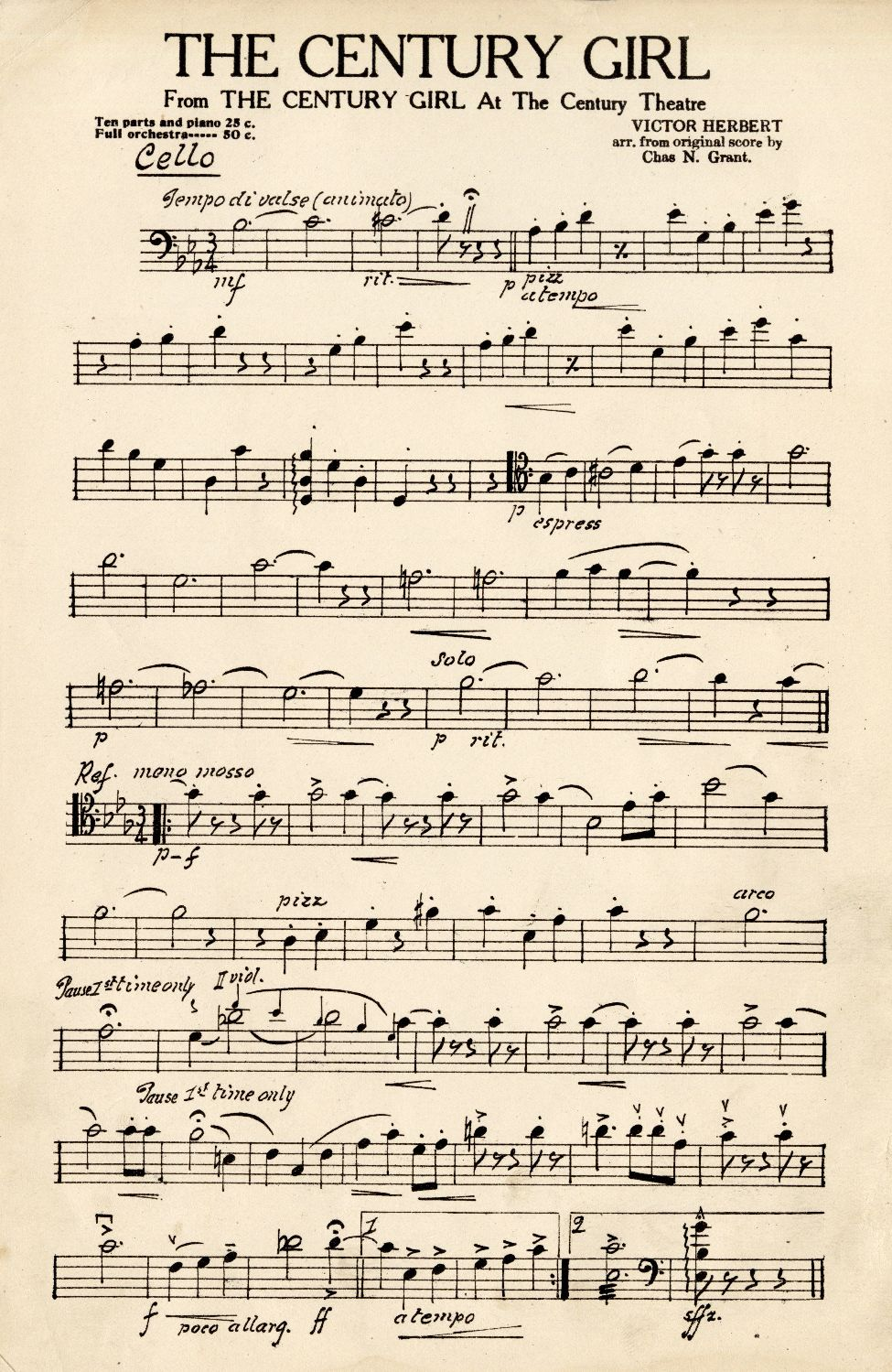
Sheet music for The Century Girl

- Alice in Wonderland
- The Ballet Loose
- The Birth of the Century Girl
- The Century Girl
- The Chicken Walk/That Broadway Chicken Walk/Jungle Ball Finale
- He Likes Their Jukelele
- Humpty Dumpty
- It Takes an Irishman to Make Love
- Kiss Me Again/Kiss Me Once More
- The Music Lesson/Herbert-Berlin Duet
- On The Train of a Wedding Gown
- The Romping Redheads
- The Stone Age
- The Toy Soldiers
- Uncle Sam's Children
- Under the Sea
- When Uncle Sam is Ruler of the Sea
- You Belong to Me

== Reception ==
The New York Times and critics from other publications reviewed the show positively.
