= Harland Dixon =

Canadian tap dancer (1885–1969)

- Born: November 4, 1885; Toronto, Ontario, Canada
- Died: June 30, 1969 (aged 83); Queens, New York, U.S.
- Occupations: Dancer, choreographer

Doyle and Dixon in 1917 show Jack O'Lantern

Harland Dixon (November 4, 1885 – June 30, 1969) was a Canadian-American dancer and choreographer, whose career encompassed vaudeville, musical theatre, and films. For much of his career he partnered with Jimmy Doyle, as Doyle and Dixon.

== Biography ==
Dixon was born on November 4, 1885, in Toronto, Ontario. His family were strictly religious, but Dixon studied gymnastics and developed an interest in vaudeville dance performances, many of which he became able to imitate. He left home and took work as a paper hanger in Buffalo, New York, then as a freight elevator operator in Boston, Massachusetts. In 1906 he moved to New York City with just US$1.75 (equivalent to $62.71 in 2025) in his pocket and worked for George H. Primrose in his minstrel show. In 1908, he married his childhood sweetheart, Charlotte MacMullen, in New York; they remained married until his death.

Dixon was known for his inventive and eccentric dance moves, being especially good at mimicry and use of a cane. His signature move, which was imitated by others, was to keep his arms stiff by his side while twisting his shoulders. He developed a duo dancing act with Jack Corcoran, and joined Lew Dockstader's minstrels, but then dissolved his partnership with Corcoran and joined with Jimmy Doyle. James Doyle (c.1888 – June 13, 1927) had been born in Halifax, Nova Scotia, and had also worked in Dockstader's troupe, though not at the same time as Dixon. The pair devised a vaudeville act in which they challenged each other to perform increasingly intricate and complex steps, including soft shoe, tap, and clog dancing, interspersed with comic patter and short sketches. In 1912 they were added to the line-up of a revue, Let George Do It, and then joined a show at the Winter Garden Theatre which also included Al Jolson and Nora Bayes.

Over the following decade, Doyle and Dixon became popular and successful, featuring on vaudeville bills and appearing in many Broadway shows, including The Honeymoon Express (1913), starring Jolson, in which they stopped the show, to Jolson's displeasure; Dancing Around (1914, also starring Jolson), Stop! Look! Listen! (1915), The Century Girl (1916, starring Marie Dressler), and The Canary (1918). A 1918 review in Variety said of them: "The Doyle and Dixon success is easily summarized: creation and individuality in their dancing. Individuality in dancing is rare, creation more so, and the combination could hardly fail, when put over with the finish these two boys give to it". By 1921, Doyle was becoming less reliable, missed rehearsals for the show Good Morning Dearie, and was sacked by show producer Charles Dillingham. Doyle worked for a while as a solo performer and dance teacher, but died in 1927, in New York, aged about 39.

Dixon continued as a solo performer. He performed in Broadway shows during the 1920s, including the Ziegfeld Follies of 1923, Kid Boots, Oh Kay!, Manhattan Mary, Top Speed, and Show Boat, and continued to perform in vaudeville and in nightclubs, as well as in Europe. In 1930, he choreographed the show Charlot's Masquerade, starring Beatrice Lillie and Florence Desmond in London, and began choreographing work for other dancers including Jimmy Cagney. He also appeared in several films, including Du Barry Did All Right and Something to Sing About (both 1937). He continued to stage and direct dance shows in nightclubs, and occasionally performed himself, into the 1960s.

Dixon died on June 27, 1969, at Physicians Hospital in Queens, New York City, at the age of 83.
