= George White's Scandals =

String of Broadway revues

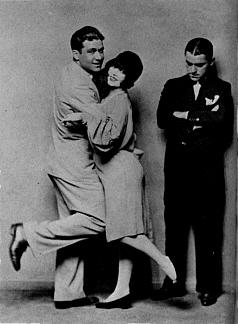
Tom Patricola and Ann Pennington dance "The Black Bottom" for George White

George White's Scandals were a long-running string of Broadway revues produced by George White that ran from 1919–1939, modeled after the Ziegfeld Follies. The "Scandals" launched the careers of many entertainers, including W. C. Fields, the Three Stooges, Ray Bolger, Helen Morgan, Ethel Merman, Ann Miller, Eleanor Powell, Bert Lahr and Rudy Vallée. Louise Brooks, Dolores Costello, Barbara Pepper, and Alice Faye got their show business start as lavishly (or scantily) dressed chorus girls strutting to the "Scandal Walk". The Black Bottom, danced by Ziegfeld Follies star Ann Pennington and Tom Patricola, touched off a national dance craze.

Several dozen of George Gershwin's songs first appeared in the 1920–24 editions of Scandals, mostly with lyricists Arthur Jackson for the first two years and Buddy De Sylva and E. Ray Goetz thereafter. Two of these songs became standards: "Stairway to Paradise" (1922, lyrics by De Sylva and Ira Gershwin under his early pseudonym, "Arthur Francis") and "Somebody Loves Me" (1924, lyrics by Ballard MacDonald and De Sylva). George Gershwin and De Sylva's twenty-minute opera Blue Monday was first performed in the 1922 edition but dropped after opening night.

George White's Scandals is also the name of several movies set within the Scandals, all of which focus primarily on the show's acts, with a thin backstage plot stringing them all together. The best known of these was 1934's George White's Scandals, with music and additional dialogue by Jack Yellen, which marked the film debut of Alice Faye. Flapper-era cartoonist and designer Russell Patterson worked on Broadway in various capacities; for George White's Scandals of 1936, he served as scenic designer. George White's Scandals of 1920 was featured in a film-length episode in the television series The Young Indiana Jones Chronicles.Young Indiana Jones and the Scandal of 1920 is the 8th episode in the second season.

== George White ==
White was an American theatrical producer and director who also was an actor, choreographer, composer, dancer, dramatist, lyricist and screenwriter, as well as a Broadway theater-owner. Appearing in the Ziegfeld Follies of 1915, he popularized the Turkey Trot dance.

== The Scandals casts ==
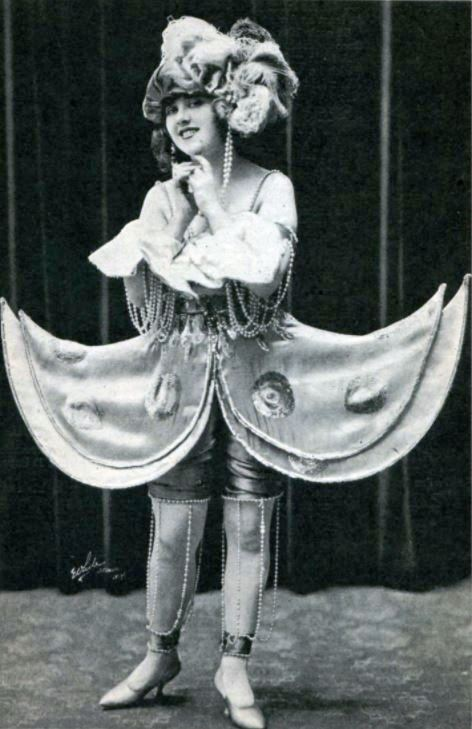
Christine Welford appeared in the 1919, 1920 and 1921 editions.

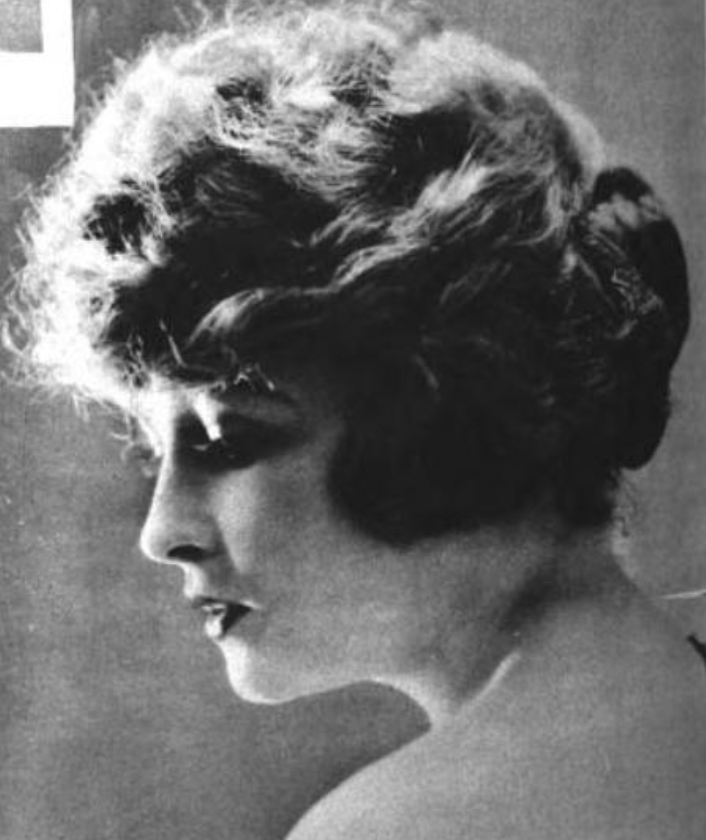
Peggy Dolan appeared in the 1919, 1920, 1922 and 1924 editions.

=== 1919 ===
- Lester Allen
- La Sylphe
- Peggy Dolan
- Ann Pennington
- Ona Munson
- Yvette Rugel
- The George White Girls (including Christine Welford)

=== 1920 ===
- Lester Allen
- Peggy Dolan
- Lou Holtz
- La Sylphe
- Ann Pennington
- The George White Girls (including Christine Welford)

=== 1921 ===
- Lester Allen
- Lou Holtz
- Tess Gardella
- Charles King
- Ann Pennington
- The George White Girls (including Christine Welford)

=== 1922 ===
- Lester Allen
- Peggy Dolan
- W. C. Fields
- Winnie Lightner
- Sally Long
- Paul Whiteman & His Orchestra
- The George White Girls (including Dolores Costello)

=== 1923 ===
- Lester Allen
- Winnie Lightner
- Tom Patricola
- The George White Girls (including Dolores Costello and Helene Costello)

=== 1924 ===
- Lester Allen
- Tony DeMarco
- Peggy Dolan
- Winnie Lightner
- Tom Patricola
- The Williams Sisters
- The George White Girls (including Louise Brooks, Dolores Costello, Helene Costello, Dorothy Sebastian and Sally Starr)

=== 1925 ===
- Helen Morgan
- Elm City Four
- Tom Patricola
- The George White Girls (including Louise Brooks)
- Patricia Bowman

=== 1926 ===
- The Fairbanks Twins
- Portland Hoffa
- Willie and Eugene Howard
- Tom Patricola
- Ann Pennington
- Harry Richman
- Fowler & Tamara
- Frances Williams
- The George White Girls
- Patricia Bowman

=== 1928 ===
- Tom Patricola
- Willie and Eugene Howard
- Ann Pennington
- Harry Richman
- The Russell Markert Dancers
- June MacCloy
- Frances Williams
- Elm City Four (including Thomas W. Ross)
- The George White Girls (including Boots Mallory)

=== 1929 ===
- Willie and Eugene Howard
- Frances Williams
- Marietta Canty
- Elm City Four (including Thomas W. Ross)
- The George White Girls

=== 1931 ===
- Ray Bolger
- Ethel Barrymore Colt
- Willie and Eugene Howard, including "Pay the Two Dollars"
- Everett Marshall, introducing "That's Why Darkies Were Born"
- Ethel Merman, introducing “Life Is Just a Bowl of Cherries”
- Rudy Vallée
- Alice Faye
- The George White Girls

=== 1932 (Music Hall Varieties) ===
- Lili Damita
- Bert Lahr
- Harry Richman
- Eleanor Powell
- The Dancing Beauties (including Barbara Pepper)

=== 1934 (film) ===
- Rudy Vallée
- Jimmy Durante
- Ketti Gallian
- Alice Faye
- Cliff Edwards
- Dixie Dunbar
- Gertrude Michael

=== 1935 (film) ===
- Alice Faye
- James Dunn
- Cliff Edwards
- Eleanor Powell
- Lyda Roberti
- Ned Sparks
- Dixie Dunbar

=== 1936 ===
- Cliff Edwards
- Bert Lahr
- Rudy Vallée
- Willie and Eugene Howard
- The George White Girls

=== 1939 ===
- Ben Blue
- Ella Logan
- The Kim Loo Sisters
- Ann Miller
- Harry Stockwell
- The Three Stooges
- The George White Girls (including Marie McDonald)

Source: IBDb

== See also ==
- George White's Scandals (1945 film)
