= Gloria Foy =

American actress (1901–1977)

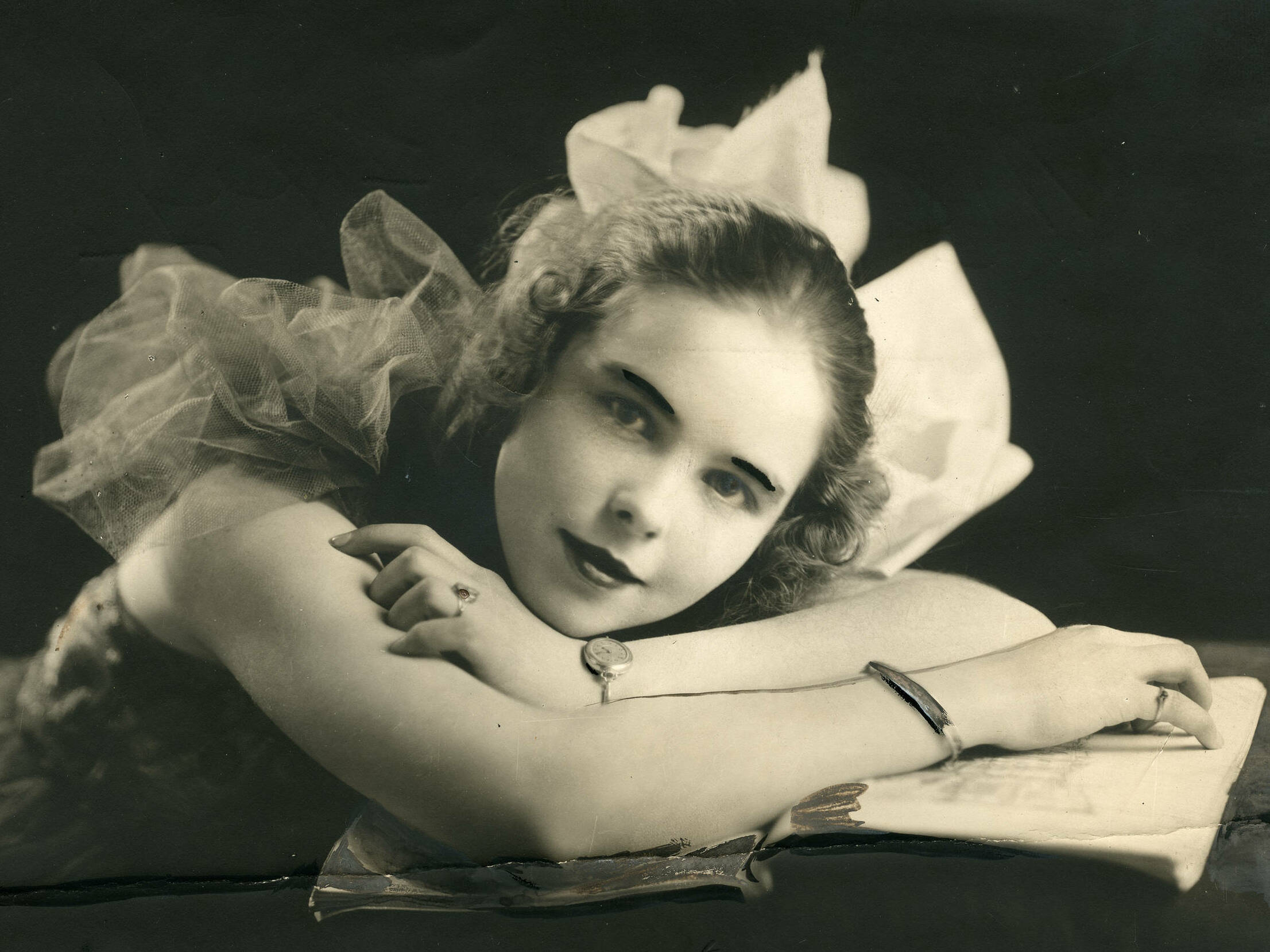
- Foy in 1922
- Born: October 25, 1901; Lima, Ohio, U.S.
- Died: February 27, 1977 (aged 75); Hollywood, California, U.S.
- Occupations: Actor; dancer; singer

Gloria Foy (October 25, 1901 – February 27, 1977) was an American dancer, singer, vaudeville performer, and star of musical revues. Her family were theatrical people. Her father was Harry Foy, but she was no relation to the more famous Eddie Foy.

== Theater dancer ==
Foy came to prominence in the John Murray Anderson Revue in March 1920, aged 18. She once claimed she gained an inch of height simply by dancing during performances of Up She Goes (1922). Her instructor explained that this happened because muscles stretch during vigorous dancing. By June 1923 she was dancing two hours per night during performances, appearing in two matinée shows per week, and also practising two hours daily. Another hour of her day was devoted to a dancing lesson. She obtained the role of "Sally" in Up She Goes when Marilyn Miller wed Jack Pickford and fell out with Florenz Ziegfeld.

In November 1924, she played the title character in Betty Lee, a musical comedy which had an all-star cast. Lou Holt and Foy were the principal players in Patsy which debuted at the Mason Operahouse in Los Angeles, California on March 8, 1926. 100 showgirls participated in the production which was conceived and produced in southern California. Among the song divertissements was a rendition of Tiger Eyes which showcased Foy and five dancers. Patsy concluded its Los Angeles run in mid-May and was put on the road to San Francisco, California and then other American cities.

Foy and Hal Skelly were signed by the Shubert Theater owners in March 1927. The two were engaged to present The Circus Princess for theater audiences. During the fall and winter season of 1930 Foy toured on the RKO vaudeville circuit. George Jessel, Viola Dana, Aunt Jemima (Tess Gardella), Georgia Price, and Anna Seymour also toured. During her vaudeville shows Foy entertained with "imitations, gags and satire".

== Inheritance ==
Foy inherited a fortune estimated to be in excess of $1,500,000, in November 1923. The money came from the will of an uncle, Richard Foy, a wealthy coffee planter in Rio de Janeiro. The sole heir, she obtained access to one third of this amount immediately.

According to its terms, the inheritance specified that she would be entitled to another third, providing that she married within three years time. The final instalment would come to Foy if she lived with her husband for ten years. By the end of the following month, December 1923, Foy had received more than 5,000 proposals from suitors worldwide.

== Sole film ==
Her sole screen credit is a small role in Dancing Lady (1933). The MGM motion picture reunited Clark Gable and Joan Crawford for the fourth time on film, this time in a musical comedy in which Crawford replaces Foy as the star of a Broadway show.

Sometime in 1934, Foy returned to New York and resumed work as a star of musical comedy. She returned to Los Angeles and was the guest of Kay Kyser at the Miramar Theater in September.

== Death ==
Gloria Foy died in Hollywood, California, from kidney disease in 1977, aged 75.

== Sources ==
- Bismarck Tribune, Some Feminists Disagree With Famous Beauty in Discussion, July 16, 1924, p. 8
- Burlington Daily Times-News, Joan Crawford And Clark Gable Graham Mon.-Tues., Saturday, February 17, 1934, p. 3
- Fitchburg Sentinel, News And Comment Of Stage And Screen, July 11, 1931, p. 5
- Los Angeles Times, Proposals Pour In To Heiress, December 27, 1923, p. I10
- Los Angeles Times, Love Lures All Mates Of Dancer, July 27, 1924, p. B29
- Los Angeles Times, Forget Ancient Traditions, March 7, 1926, p. 21
- Los Angeles Times, Society of Cinemaland, March 7, 1926, p. 38
- Los Angeles Times, When Tiger Eyes Are Smiling, May 4, 1926, Page A11.
- Los Angeles Times, Hobnobbing In Hollywood, August 22, 1933, p. A7
- Los Angeles Times, Hobnobbing In Hollywood, May 26, 1934, p. 6
- Los Angeles Times, Around and About in Hollywood, September 6, 1934, p. 19
- Los Angeles Times, Around and About in Hollywood, September 12, 1934, p. 18
- Modesto Evening News, Girl Adds More Than Inch To Her Height By Dancing, Saturday, June 23, 1923, p. 19
- Modesto Evening News, Young, Pretty And Wealthy, This Girl Wants A Husband, Monday, November 26, 1923, p. 2
- Modesto Evening News, Gloria Foy Chooses Buick, Saturday, December 8, 1923, p. 30.
- New York Times, John Murray Anderson's Revue, March 20, 1920, p. 14
- Oakland Tribune, Exits And Entrances, March 24, 1927, p. 17
- Oakland Tribune, Cohens, Kellys Bring Laughs At Orpheum, January 15, 1931, p. 24
- Ogden Standard-Examiner, Percy Hammond's Letter, Sunday Morning, November 19, 1922, p. 19
- Sandusky Star Journal, Monday, March 22, 1920, p. 7
- Syracuse Herald, Wieting Offers Betty Lee For Week-End Run, November 9, 1924, p. 52
- Syracuse Herald, Up And Down The Rialtos, Wednesday Evening, September 3, 1930, p. 17
- Syracuse Herald, The Stage, February 28, 1924, p. 19
