= Billy Moll =

American songwriter, lyricist (1904–1968)

Billy (Wilbur) Moll (1904 – January 17, 1968) was an American songwriter and primarily lyricist, the co-writer of several popular songs such as "I Want a Little Girl" (1930), "Wrap Your Troubles in Dreams" (1931), "Hang Out the Stars in Indiana" (1931), and the novelty song "Ice Cream (I Scream, You Scream, We All Scream for Ice Cream)" (1927). His works were performed by artists such as Frank Sinatra, Bing Crosby, Bessie Smith, Frankie Laine, Barbra Streisand, Eric Clapton, Sarah Vaughan, Ella Fitzgerald, Count Basie and Al Bowlly.

== Life ==
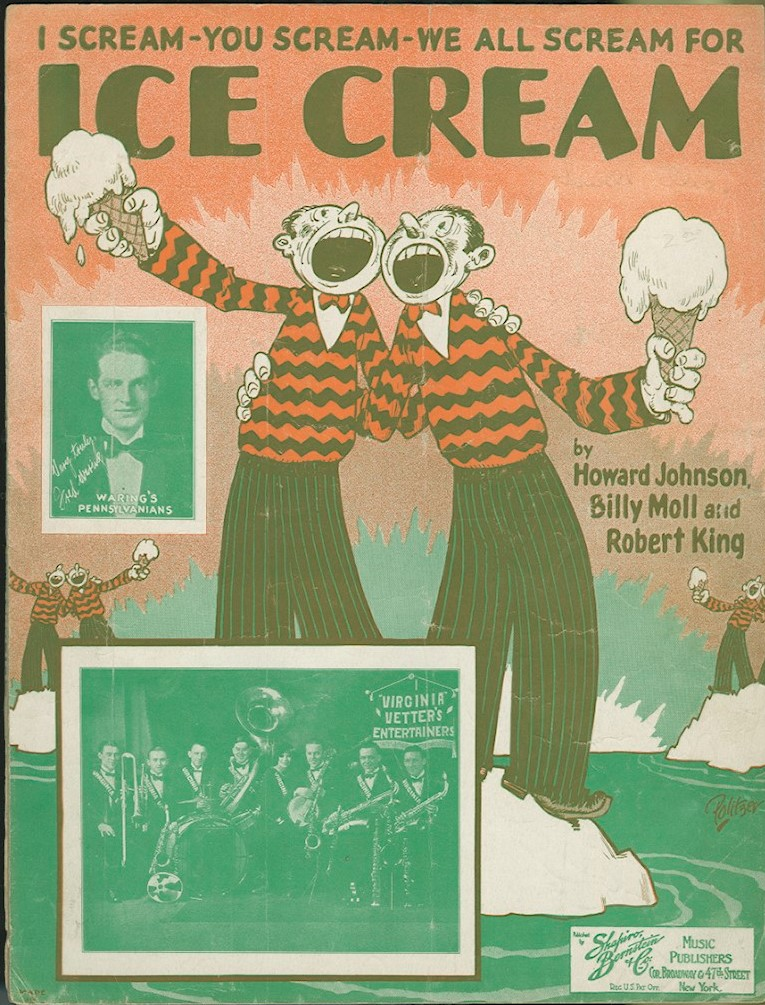
Sheet music cover for "Ice Cream (I Scream, You Scream, We All Scream for Ice Cream)" (1927).

Moll was born in Madison, Wisconsin in 1904, the son of Frank Moll and his wife. Moll's father was a carpenter at the University of Wisconsin. Moll attended Randall Grade School at Madison, followed by High School. His first song, "The Memphis Maybe Man", was published in 1924; this was followed by "Six Feet of Papa", first recorded in August 1926. His first major hit was the 1927 novelty song, "Ice Cream (I Scream, You Scream, We All Scream for Ice Cream)". Moll worked mainly as a lyricist, sometimes working with other lyricists such as Ted Koehler.

Moll married Lauretta Radecki of Stoughton, Wisconsin in 1928. In August 1929 the couple moved to New York City, where Moll had gained employment with the Tin Pan Alley company of Shapiro-Bernstein Music Publishing Company. Here music was produced for popular songs, and music for movies and plays: his work was mostly to do with lyrics. In 1930, he wrote the lyrics for a Broadway musical, Jonica (credited as William Moll). In the early 1940s the couple relocated back to Stoughton where Moll continued to write songs for the company. Moll was a member of the American Society of Composers, Authors and Publishers.

Moll died in Stoughton, Wisconsin on January 17, 1968, aged 63, and was buried in St. Ann's Catholic Cemetery, Stoughton. He was survived by his wife and three sons.

== Songs used in films ==
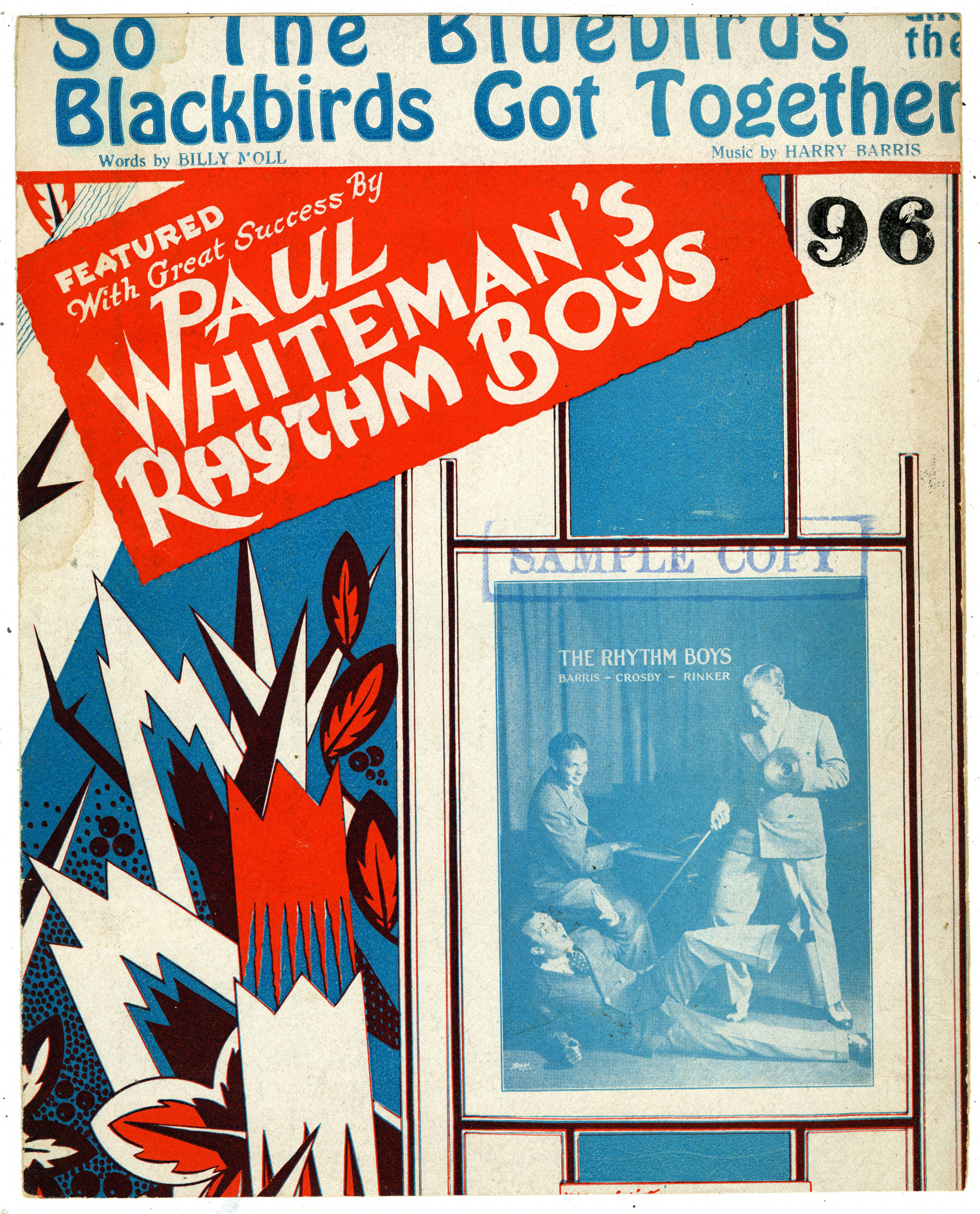
Sheet music cover for "So The Bluebirds and the Blackbirds Got Together" (1929). Paul Whiteman's Rhythm Boys featured Bing Crosby.

While employed by Shapiro, Bernstein & Co., Moll co-wrote music for "talkie" films: "Sergeant Flagg and Sergeant Quirt" for The Cock-Eyed World (1929), "Atta Boy" for Howdy Broadway (1929) and "Lil" for For the Love o' Lil (1930). Also in 1930, "So The Bluebirds and the Blackbirds Got Together " featured in the movie King of Jazz, and "Ro-ro-rollin' Along" in the Western film Near the Rainbow's End. In 1931 Moll contributed additional lyrics to the 1926 song "Honeymoon Lane', from the musical of the same name written by James F. Hanley (music), Eddie Dowling (lyrics), for the 1931 filmed version.

"Wrap Your Troubles in Dreams" was performed by Bing Crosby four times, with its film debut in the Mack Sennett short, One More Chance (1931). It was also was sung by Frankie Laine in the film Rainbow 'Round My Shoulder (1952), and it is included in the soundtrack for the 1974 Barbra Streisand film The Way We Were: Original Soundtrack Recording.

The August 25, 1931 version of "Hang Out the Stars in Indiana", recorded in London with Al Bowlly as vocalist, accompanied by Ray Noble and his New Mayfair Dance Orchestra. was used by film director Bruce Robinson in his 1987 film, Withnail and I. It also features in the soundtrack of the 2020 film Six Minutes to Midnight. The 2008 film The Edge of Love, starring Keira Knightley, Sienna Miller, Cillian Murphy and Matthew Rhys, featured pop singer Suggs (credited as Graham McPherson) as crooner Al Bowlly. He sings "Hang Out the Stars in Indiana" in a scene filmed in a nightclub. Knightley also briefly sings the song in another scene.

== Partial discography ==
Information about Moll's songwriting credits is largely taken from the Discography of American Historical Recordings.

Song	Contribution	Other contributors	First performer	Recording company	Date of first recording
"The Memphis Maybe Man"	Music and lyrics	Doc Cook (music and lyrics), Haven Gillespie (music and lyrics)	Cook's Dreamland Orchestra	Gennett	1924-01-21
"Six Feet of Papa"	Lyrics	Arthur Sizemore (music)	Virginia Childs	Columbia	1926-08-20
"Gid-ap Garibaldi"	Lyrics	Harry Warren (music), Howard Johnson (lyrics)	Pennsylvanians; Fred Waring	Victor	1927-06-23
"Ice Cream (I Scream, You Scream, We All Scream for Ice Cream)"	Lyrics	Robert A. King (music), Howard Johnson (lyrics)	Pennsylvanians; Fred Waring / The Rollickers	Victor / Edison	1927-11-30
"Loving You Like I Do"	Lyrics	Bernie Grossman (music), Arthur Sizemore (music)	Jean Goldkette Orchestra	Victor	1928-07-16
"So the Bluebirds and the Blackbirds Got Together"	Lyrics	Harry Barris (music)	Paul Whiteman's Rhythm Boys	Victor; Columbia	1929-01-25
"Sergeant Flagg and Sergeant Quirt (I'll Tell the Cock-eyed World)"	Music and lyrics	Lou Klein (lyrics)	Billy Murray; Walter Scanlan	Edison	1929-09-12
"I'm Keeping Company Now"	Lyrics	Eddie Cantor, Charles Tobias	7 Blue Babies; Jack Dalton	Edison	1929-09-20
"Atta Boy (Old Pal! Old Sock! Old. Kid! Old Thing! Old Gold! Old Baby!)"	Lyrics	Tommy Christian (music)	Tom Gerun Orchestra	Brunswick	1930-02-03
"Me and the Girl Next Door"	Music and lyrics	Murray Mencher (music and lyrics)	Eddie Walters	Columbia	1930-02-27
"I'd Go Barefoot All Winter Long (If You'd Fall for Me in the Spring)"	Lyrics	Joe Keden (music)	Helen Kane	Victor	1930-03-18
"Ro-ro-rollin' Along"	Lyrics	Murray Mencher (music), Harry Richman (lyrics)	Roy Evans	Columbia	1930-04-10
"Baby, Have Pity on Me"	Lyrics	Clarence Williams (music and lyrics)	Bessie Smith; Charlie Green; Clarence Williams	Columbia	1930-04-12
"Moonlight on the Colorado"	Lyrics	Robert A. King (music)	Bud Billings; Carson Robison	Victor	1930-07-01
"I Want a Little Girl"	Lyrics	Murray Mencher (music)	McKinney's Cotton Pickers; George Thomas	Victor	1930-07-30
"Waiting by the Silv'ry Rio Grande"	Lyrics	Murray Mencher (music)	The Cavaliers	Columbia	1930-11-12
"Twenty Swedes Ran Through the Weeds (Chasing One Norwegian)"	Music and lyrics	Al Bryan (music and lyrics)	The California Ramblers	Columbia	1930-12-02
"Lil"	Lyrics	?	?	?	1930
"I Haven't Heard a Single Word From Baby"	Music and lyrics	Eddie Cantor, Murray Mencher	Val Rosing, Jack Payne and the BBC Dance Orchestra	Columbia	1931-01-06
"Wrap Your Troubles in Dreams"	Lyrics	Harry Barris (music), Ted Koehler (lyrics)	Bing Crosby	Victor	1931-03-02
"Hang Out the Stars in Indiana"	Lyrics	Harry M. Woods (music)	Roy Evans	Columbia	1931-03-27
"I Love You in the Same Sweet Way"	Lyrics	Robert A. King (music)	Ted Lewis and his Band	Columbia	1931-07-01
"Honeymoon Lane"	Lyrics	James F. Hanley (music), Eddie Dowling (lyrics)	New Mayfair Dance Orchestra directed by Ray Noble (with Vocal Refrain by Al Bowlly)	His Master's Voice	1931-08-25
"Somewhere in the West"	Lyrics	?	Dick Robertson	Victor	1932-01-15
"'Long about Sundown" (aka "Round about Sundown")	Lyrics	Joseph Meyer (music)	Don Bestor Orchestra	Victor	1932-09-29
"This is No Dream"	Lyrics	Joseph Meyer (music)	Frank Munn; Victor Arden-Phil Ohman Orchestra	Victor	1932-10-27
"At the Close of a Long, Long Day"	Lyrics	Johnny Marvin (music)	Don Hall Trio; Dick Robertson	Victor	1932-11-30
"In a Sleepy Little Village"	Lyrics	Red Norvo (music)	Mildred Bailey	?	1932
"There's a House on a Hill"	Lyrics	Joseph Meyer (music)	Freddie Rich and his Orchestra; Paul Small	Columbia	1933-02-07
"Drifting Down the Shalimar"	Lyrics	James V. Monaco (music)	Bob and Alf Pearson	Imperial	1933
"My Cat Fell in the Well (Well, Well, Well)"	Music and lyrics	Dick Robertson (music and lyrics), Terry Shand (music and lyrics)	Eddie DeLange Orchestra	Victor	1939-09-21
"Seven Women in One"	Lyrics	Bob Miller (music)	Panhandle Punchers; Texas Jim Robertson	Victor	1946-09-18
