= Honeymoon Lane =

Honeymoon Lane may refer to:

- Honeymoon Lane (musical), 1926 Broadway musical
- Honeymoon Lane (film), 1931 film based on the musical
