= Kate Smith =

American contralto (1907–1986)

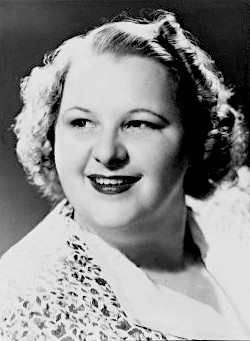
- Smith in 1943

Background information
- Born: Kathryn Elizabeth Smith; May 1, 1907; Greenville, Virginia, U.S.
- Died: June 17, 1986 (aged 79) Raleigh, North Carolina, U.S.
- Occupations: Singer
- Years active: 1926–1976
- Labels: RCA Victor, Savoy Records

Kathryn Elizabeth Smith (May 1, 1907 – June 17, 1986) was an American contralto. Referred to as The First Lady of Radio, Smith became well known for her renditions of "God Bless America" and "When the Moon Comes over the Mountain".

== Songbird of the South ==
She began to use the descriptor The Songbird of the South in the late 1920s, while performing on the stage. This term was also used by other southern vocalists of that era; however, as the Washington D.C. Sunday Star noted, Smith was not really southern—born in Virginia, she had spent nearly all of her life in the D.C. area. But as Smith became nationally known, she became more identified with the term. By early 1929, she was being referred to that way on a regular basis: a version of the term, using "from" rather than "of," was seen in newspaper advertisements that promoted her stage performances. "Songbird of the South" was used when she appeared on the NBC Radio Network in April. Then, in the summer of that year, she starred in a Vitaphone short feature titled "Songbird of the South," in which she sang two of her hit songs, "Bless You Sister" and "Carolina Moon."

== Early life ==
Smith was born on May 1, 1907, in Greenville, Virginia, to Charlotte 'Lottie' Yarnell (née Hanby) and William Herman Smith, and she grew up in Washington, D.C. Her father owned the Capitol News Company, distributing newspapers and magazines in the greater D.C. area. Smith was the youngest of three daughters, the middle child dying in infancy. She failed to talk until she was four years old, but a year later she was singing at church social events. By the time she was eight, she was singing for the troops at Army camps in the Washington area during World War I. Smith never had a singing lesson in her life and possessed a range of two and a half octaves. Her earliest performances were during amateur nights at vaudeville theaters in D.C.

Smith's earliest musical influences were her parents. Her father sang in the choir at the Catholic church, and her mother played piano at the Presbyterian church. She attended Business High School in D.C. (now Theodore Roosevelt High School), likely graduating in 1924. Alarmed by his daughter's evident penchant for the stage, her father sent Smith to the George Washington University School for Nursing, where she attended classes for nine months between 1924 and 1925, withdrawing to pursue a career in show business.

Smith got herself on the bill at Keith's Theater in Boston as a singer. Heading the bill was actor and producer Eddie Dowling, who recruited the young singer for a revue he was preparing. It was called Honeymoon Lane, and it opened in Atlantic City, New Jersey, on August 29, 1926. A month later, it moved to Broadway.

An indelicate review in The New York Times on October 31, 1926, under the heading "A Sophie Tucker Rival", said: "A 19-year-old girl, weighing in the immediate neighborhood of 200 pounds, is one of the discoveries of the season for those whose interests run to syncopators and singers of what in the varieties and nightclubs are known as 'hot' songs. Kate Smith is the newcomer's not uncommon name."

When Honeymoon Lane closed, Smith had difficulty finding work in New York, so she returned to Washington, D.C., where she appeared sporadically in vaudeville. Smith joined the road company of Vincent Youmans' Hit the Deck, where she won acclaim singing "Hallelujah!" as a mammy in blackface. Back in New York City, she took the company lead in George White's Flying High. The show opened March 3, 1930, at the whites only Hurtig & Seamon's New Burlesque Theater, which later became the Apollo Theater. It ran for 122 performances. As Pansy Sparks, Smith's role was to be the butt of Bert Lahr's often cruel jibes about her girth. She said later that she often wept with humiliation in her dressing room after the show.

== Career ==
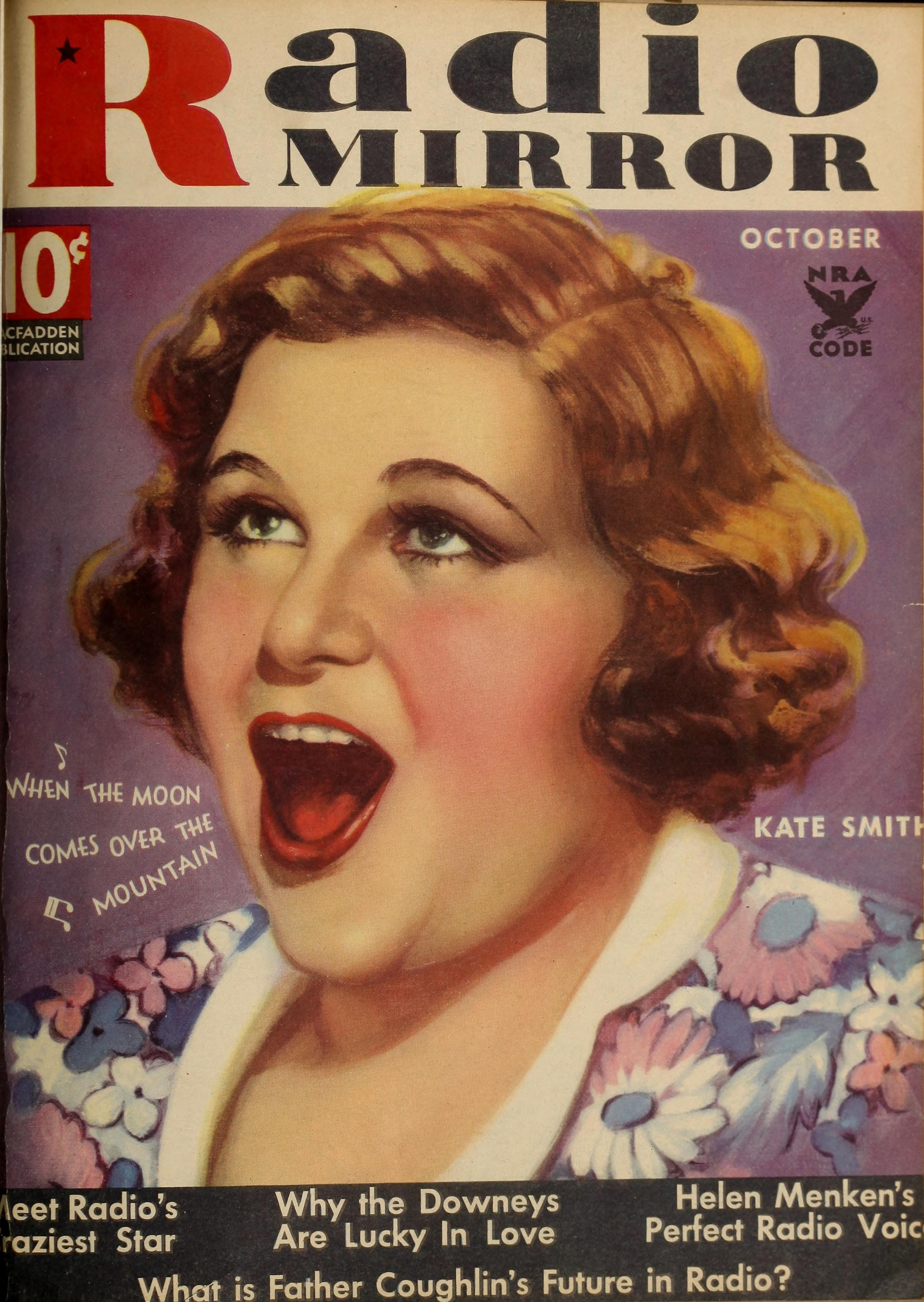
Smith on 1934 cover of Radio Mirror

During Honeymoon Lane's run in New York, Smith made her first phonograph recordings, consisting of songs from that show. The first sessions were for Victor, but none were issued. Her first issued recordings, from an October 28, 1926, session, appeared on the Columbia label. She made a few more records for Columbia through May 1927. In 1929 through 1931 she again returned to Columbia's studios, this time appearing for the budget labels Harmony, Diva and Velvet Tone under a pseudonym. These commercially successful records were often sung in the style of Ethel Waters and Ruth Etting, although others were more akin to the early crooning style of Bing Crosby and Russ Columbo.

Her musical career took a huge leap in 1930 when Columbia Records A&R executive Ted Collins took an interest as a result of her Hit the Deck performances. Collins would become her longtime manager in a 50–50 partnership. Smith had become self-conscious regarding her weight, in no small part because of the on- and off-stage mocking she received from co-star Bert Lahr. She later credited Collins with helping her overcome her self-consciousness, writing: "Ted Collins was the first man who regarded me as a singer, and didn't even seem to notice that I was a big girl." She noted, "I'm big, and I sing, and boy, when I sing, I sing all over!"

Collins put Smith on radio in 1931. That year, she performed "Dream a Little Dream of Me". Her biggest hits were "River, Stay 'Way from My Door" (1931), "The Woodpecker Song" (1940), "The White Cliffs of Dover" (1942), "Rose O'Day" (1941), "The Last Time I Saw Paris" (1940), "I Don't Want to Walk Without You" (1942), "There Goes That Song Again" (1944), "Seems Like Old Times" (1946), and "Now Is the Hour" (1947). "Rose O'Day" sold more than one million copies, her first to achieve this feat, and was awarded a gold disc by the RIAA. Her theme song was "When the Moon Comes over the Mountain"; she had helped write the lyrics. Smith always greeted her audiences with "Hello, everybody!" and signed off with "Thanks for listenin'."

In 1932, Smith appeared in Hello, Everybody!, with co-stars Randolph Scott and Sally Blane, and in the 1943 wartime film This Is the Army, she sang "God Bless America", which became her signature song.

=== Radio ===
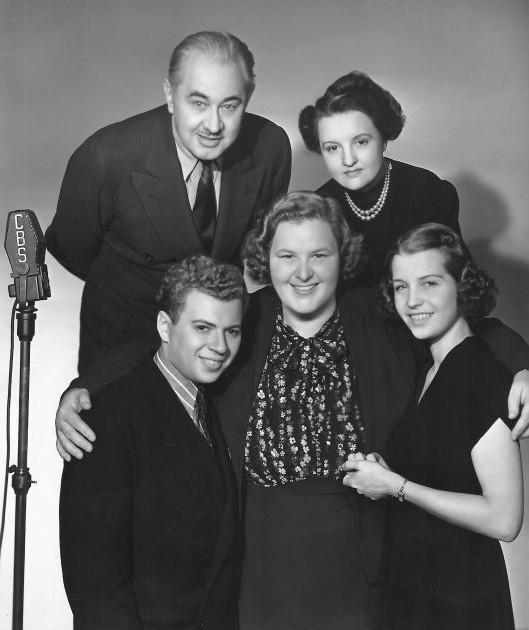
The Aldriches and Kate Smith as the characters premiered on her radio program in September 1938

Smith was a major star of radio, usually backed by Jack Miller's Orchestra. She began with her twice-a-week NBC series, Kate Smith Sings (quickly expanded to six shows a week), followed by a series of shows for CBS: Kate Smith and Her Swanee Music (1931–33), sponsored by La Palina Cigars; The Kate Smith Matinee (1934–35); The Kate Smith New Star Revue (1934–35); Kate Smith's Coffee Time (1935–36), sponsored by A&P; and The Kate Smith A&P Bandwagon (1936–37).

The Kate Smith Hour was a leading radio variety show, offering comedy, music, and drama with appearances by top personalities of films and theater for eight years (1937–1945). The show's resident comics, Abbott and Costello and Henny Youngman, introduced their comedy to a nationwide radio audience aboard her show, while a series of sketches based on the Broadway production of the same name led to The Aldrich Family as a separate hit series in 1940.

Smith also made a dramatic appearance, starring in "Little Johnny Appleseed", on Silver Theater on May 14, 1944. By 1946, she also collaborated with the actor Pat O'Brien on the Viva America program for the CBS radio network in support of America's cultural diplomacy initiatives in South America.

Smith's figure was not the only target of satire. Her cheery radio sign-on was parodied by comedian Henry Morgan when he launched his own show in 1942: "Good evening, anybody, here's Morgan," which became his sign-on. Morgan recalled in his memoir Here's Morgan, that Smith's sign-on struck him as condescending: "I, on the other hand, was grateful if anybody was listening."

Smith continued on the Mutual Broadcasting System, CBS, ABC, and NBC, presenting both music and talk shows on radio until 1960.

=== World War II ===
Smith "stirred patriotic fervor" during World War II and contributed to the sale of more than $600 million (equivalent to $13.1 billion in 2025) of war bonds during a series of marathon broadcasts. No other show business star came near her sales of bonds to finance the United States' war effort.

In 1944, Smith launched a campaign against the film Double Indemnity. James M. Cain recalled that "there was a little trouble caused by this fat girl, Kate Smith, who carried on a propaganda asking people to stay away from the picture. Her advertisement probably put a million dollars on its gross."

=== Television ===
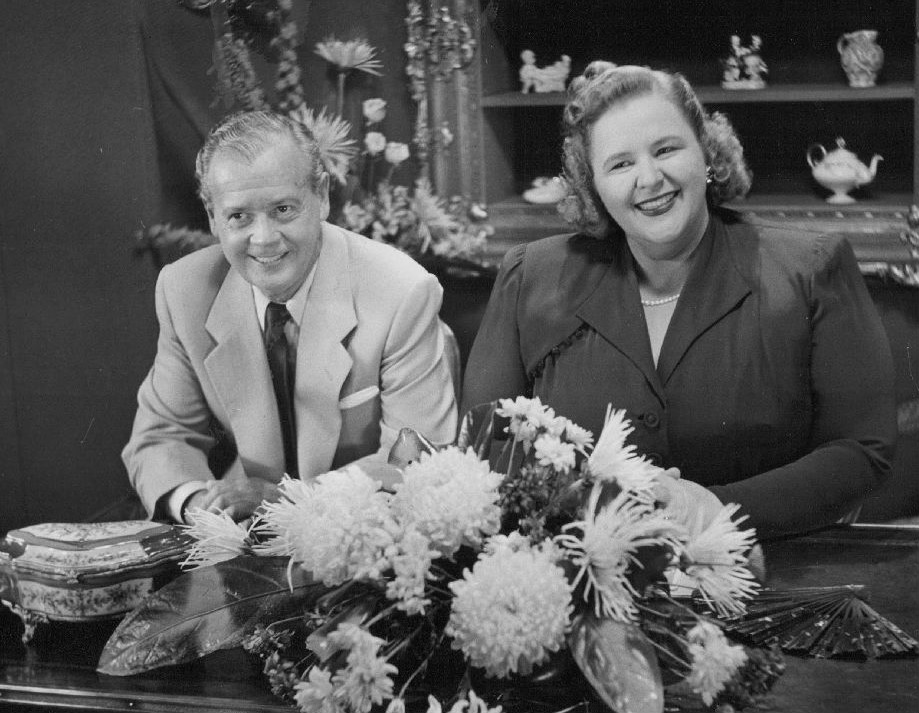
Ted Collins and Smith on her television show, 1953

Smith starred in two concurrent television programs in the early 1950s The Kate Smith Hour on NBC Television from 1950 through 1954, hosting until 1953 in the late afternoon hour of 4:00 pm ET. James Dean and Audrey Hepburn made early acting appearances on the show. Smith also starred in the weekly The Kate Smith Evening Hour, which included a rare US TV appearance by Josephine Baker as well as the only major filmed footage of Hank Williams.

From January 25 to July 18, 1960, Smith hosted The Kate Smith Show, a variety program on the CBS Television Monday evening schedule. On October 2, 1966, Smith performed on the British television show, Sunday Night at the London Palladium.

Because of her popularity, her face was a common sight in print advertisements of the day. Over the years, she appeared as a commercial spokeswoman for numerous companies such as Studebaker, Pullman Company, Diamond Crystal Salt, and Jell-O.

== Recordings ==
Smith recorded dozens of successful albums and songs during the 1930s and 1940s. She recorded sporadically during the 1950s, but in 1963 signed a contract with RCA Victor to record a number of successful albums, including several that charted on the Billboard Hot 200 chart alongside the major rock stars of the era, usually with Smith, then well into her fifties, the oldest performer on the charts. In 1967, she had her first new hit record in many years when "Anyone Can Move A Mountain" peaked at #30 on Billboard's Easy Listening Hits chart in July 1967. This record was her only 1960s single release to be successful. In 1974, Smith returned to Billboard's Easy Listening chart when "Smile, Smile, Smile", a one-shot single release (and her last recording) for Atlantic Records, peaked at #42 in June 1974.

=== Best-selling singles ===
Title	Details	Peak chart positions	
Title	Details	US	US Country
"One Sweet Letter from You"	Release date: 1927; Label: Columbia Records	14	—
"When the Moon Comes Over the Mountain"	Release date: 1931; Label: Columbia Records	1	—
"I Don't Know Why"	Release date: 1931; Label: Columbia Records	15	—
"That's Why Darkies Were Born"	Release date: 1931; Label: Columbia Records	12	—
"River Stay Away from My Door"	Release date: 1932; Label: Columbia Records	1	—
"Too Late"	Release date: 1932; Label: Columbia Records	9	—
"Snuggled on Your Shoulder"	Release date: 1932; Label: Columbia Records	10	—
Medley from Face the Music	Release date: 1932; Label: Columbia Records	8	—
"My Mom"	Release date: 1932; Label: Columbia Records	10	—
Kate Smith Presents a Memory Program	Release date: 1932; Label: Columbia Records	17	—
"Shine on Harvest Moon"	Release date: 1933; Label: Columbia Records	19	—
"Bei Mir Bist Du Schon (Means That You're Grand)"	Release date: 1938; Label: RCA Victor Records	15	—
"God Bless America"	Release date: 1939; Label: RCA Victor Records	10	—
"The Last Time I Saw Paris"	Release date: 1940; Label: Columbia Records	8	—
"The Woodpecker Song"	Release date: 1940; Label: Columbia Records	14	—
"I'm Stepping Out with a Memory Tonight"	Release date: 1940; Label: Columbia Records	25	—
"God Bless America" (second charting)	Release date: 1940; Label: RCA Victor Records	5	—
"God Bless America" (third charting)	Release date: 1942; Label: RCA Victor Records	23	—
"Rose O'Day"	Release date: 1942; Label: Columbia Records	8	—
"(There'll Be Bluebirds Over) The White Cliffs of Dover"	Release date: 1942; Label: Columbia Records	9	—
"How Do I Know It's Real?"	Release date: 1942; Label: Columbia Records	21	—
"I Threw a Kiss in the Ocean"	Release date: 1942; Label: Columbia Records	10	—
"Don't Fence Me In"	Release date: 1945; Label: Columbia Records	8	—
"There Goes That Song Again"	Release date: 1945; Label: Columbia Records	12	—
"And There You Are"	Release date: 1945; Label: Columbia Records	21	—
"Seems Like Old Times"	Release date: 1946; Label: Columbia Records	12	—
"Foggy River"	Release date: 1948; Label: MGM Records	—	10
"Now Is the Hour"	Release date: 1948; Label: MGM Records	12	—
"—" denotes releases that did not chart

=== Record albums ===
(US chart positions courtesy Billboard magazine).

- 1949 Songs of Erin (10", Album), Columbia Records
- 1954 Kate Smith, Capitol Records
- 1958 The Fabulous Kate, Kapp Records
- 1958 Rip Van Winkle / Johnny Appleseed (with Lionel Barrymore), Full Fidelity Lion Records
- 1959 Christmas with The Great Kate, Mayfair Records
- 1960 Kate Smith Sings God Bless America, Tops Records
- 1963 Kate Smith at Carnegie Hall, RCA Victor Records #83 US
- 1964 The Sweetest Sounds of Kate Smith, RCA Victor Records #145 US
- 1965 A Touch of Magic, RCA Victor Records
- 1965 How Great Thou Art, RCA Victor Records #36 US
- 1966 Today, RCA Victor Records #148 US
- 1966 The Glorious Voice of Kate Smith, Pickwick Records
- 1966 The Kate Smith Anniversary Album, RCA Victor Records #130 US
- 1966 The Kate Smith Christmas Album, RCA Victor Records
- 1967 Just a Closer Walk with Thee, RCA Victor Records
- 1967 Here & Now, RCA Victor Records
- 1967 Something Special, RCA Victor Records
- 1968 May God Be with You, RCA Victor Records
- 1968 America's Favorites (with Arthur Fiedler and The Boston Pops, RCA Victor Red Seal
- 1968 The Best of Kate Smith, RCA Victor Records
- 1968 The One and Only, Kapp Records
- 1969 Songs of the Now Generation, RCA Victor Records
- 1970 The Best of Kate Smith Sacred, RCA Victor Records
- 1970 God Bless America & Other Great American Songs, Happy Time Records
- 1970 The Fabulous Kate Smith, RCA Camden
- 1974 God Bless America, Sunbeam Records
- 1976 Kate Smith Sings America's Favorites, RCA Special Products
- 1978 A Legendary Performer, RCA Records

== Significance in professional sports ==
During the second half of the 1936–37 season for the revived version of the original American Basketball League, Smith and her talent manager agent, Ted Collins, would bring back the Original Celtics and have them reappear in the ABL as the New York Celtics for the second half of that season. They would return once again for the entirety of the 1937–38 under that name before essentially being replaced by the Troy Haymakers for the 1938–39 season (though the Troy Haymakers would presumably participate in the 1939 World Professional Basketball Tournament as the Troy Celtics to represent the Original Celtics franchise), with Troy being around for a part of the 1939–40 season before becoming the Troy Celtics (a sort of spiritual successor to the Original Celtics) for the majority of that season (which occurred following a merger between the Troy Haymakers and the Kingston Colonials early on in that season) and then partially being the Troy Celtics for the 1940–41 season before becoming the Brooklyn Celtics for the rest of that season afterward. (While the Troy Celtics would have one last appearance in the ABL for the 1946–47 season, neither Smith nor Collins would be involved with bringing that team back by then. Not only that, but she wouldn't have any involvement in allowing the Boston Celtics to have the rights to utilize the Celtics team name from the Original Celtics franchise since Jim Furey, the original franchise's owner from that history, would allow them that right by then.) This would mark as one of the first times where a female owner would be involved with a professional basketball team during a professional basketball league.

The Philadelphia Flyers ice hockey team played Smith's rendition of "God Bless America" before their game on December 11, 1969. The Flyers' public address announcer had noticed that people would not pay attention or would show disdain for the "Star-Spangled Banner" played before games, due to the tensions caused by the Vietnam War, and he decided to use Smith's rendition of "God Bless America" instead. The crowd responded more favorably to this recording. After the Flyers won the game, it was decided by the team that the song would be used as an alternative to the "Star-Spangled Banner", but only for certain important games.

At the Flyers' home opener against the Toronto Maple Leafs on October 11, 1973, Smith made a surprise appearance to perform the song in person and received a tremendous reception. The Flyers won that game by a 2–0 score. She again performed the song at the Spectrum in front of a capacity crowd of 17,007 fans before game six of the Stanley Cup Final on May 19, 1974, against the Boston Bruins. Before this game, Smith had a "Flyer Record" of 36–3–1 (win-loss-tie). After her performance, in keeping with the Flyers' reputation of "The Broad Street Bullies", Smith mimicked a knockout punch. Boston's defenseman Bobby Orr and center Phil Esposito tried to jinx the Flyers' "good luck charm" by shaking her hand after her performance. Yet the Flyers won their first of two back-to-back Stanley Cups, winning that playoff series against the Boston Bruins 4 games to 2, with goaltender Bernie Parent shutting the Bruins out 1–0 in the game.

Smith also performed live at the Flyers' home game on May 13, 1975, before game seven of the Stanley Cup semifinals against the Islanders. After her performance, Islanders' captain Ed Westfall presented her with a bouquet of flowers as each member of the Islanders lined up to shake her hand. Nonetheless, the Flyers won the game 4–1. On May 16, 1976, Smith made one of her final public performances before game four of the Stanley Cup Final when the Flyers lost to the Montreal Canadiens 5–3 and were swept in that series. She made her final public performance on May 23, 1985, before game two of the Stanley Cup Final when the Flyers lost to the Edmonton Oilers 3–1, and lost the series in five games.

The Flyers' record when "God Bless America" was played or sung by Smith in person stood at 100 wins, 29 losses, and five ties as of April 20, 2016. Smith and her song remain a special part of Flyers' history. In 1987, the team erected a statue of Smith outside the Spectrum, their arena at the time, in her memory. However, the statue was later covered and then removed in April 2019 due to criticism of lyrics in some of her earlier songs that were perceived as racist. Until that time, the Flyers still showed a video of her singing "God Bless America" in lieu of The Star-Spangled Banner for good luck before important games. The video of Smith's performance was later accompanied by Lauren Hart, daughter of the late Hockey Hall of Fame broadcaster Gene Hart, the longtime voice of and anthem singer for the Flyers. Before games whenever "God Bless America" was performed, Lou Nolan, the public address announcer for the Flyers at Wells Fargo Center would say, "Ladies and gentlemen, at this time, we ask that you please rise and remove your hats and salute our flags and welcome the number-one ranked anthemist in the NHL, Lauren Hart, as she sings 'God Bless America', accompanied by the great Kate Smith."

Smith's plump figure made her an occasional object of derision; however, late in her career, Philadelphia Flyers hockey fans said about her appearance before games "It ain't BEGUN 'til the fat lady sings!" Smith was 5 feet 10 inches (1.78 m) tall and weighed 235 pounds (107 kg) at the age of 30. She titled her 1938 autobiography Living in a Great Big Way.

Smith was the grand marshal of the 1976 Tournament of Roses Parade in Pasadena, California, and sang "God Bless America" and the National Anthem before the Rose Bowl game, a UCLA victory over Ohio State.

=== 21st-century controversy ===
Smith's rendition of "God Bless America" was played during the seventh-inning stretch of New York Yankees home games from 2001 until April 2019, when the practice was discontinued amid controversy surrounding her 1931 recordings of "That's Why Darkies Were Born" and "Pickaninny Heaven". The following day, the Philadelphia Flyers followed suit, and the statue of Smith outside the Flyers' arena was removed on April 21, 2019. Her family responded by denying the racism allegations. Those against the discontinuation of Smith's recordings have cited the satirical nature of the song "That's Why Darkies Were Born", and the fact that it was also popularized by Paul Robeson. The song "Pickaninny Heaven" is from the movie Hello, Everybody!, one of whose writers was Fannie Hurst, an advocate for African American equality.

Smith called for racial tolerance in 1945 in an address on CBS Radio, declaring, "Race hatreds, social prejudices, religious bigotry, they are the diseases that eat away the fibers of peace". She went on to state "it is up to us to tolerate one another in order to achieve peace".

== Personal life ==
Smith, who never married, rented several apartments in Manhattan during her long career. She had a home in Arlington, Virginia, and kept a summer home on a small island in Lake Placid, New York.

=== Religion ===
After attending services at a Catholic parish for 25 years, Smith converted to Roman Catholicism in 1965. During the time she spent in Lake Placid, she regularly attended Sunday Mass at St. Agnes Roman Catholic Church and could be heard singing the hymns in her contralto voice.

== Death ==
In her later years, Smith was impaired by diabetes. In 1976, she suffered brain damage after slipping into a diabetic coma. After she emerged from the coma, her family helped her move in 1979 to Raleigh. At the 1982 Emmy Awards, Smith, by then in a wheelchair, was brought onto stage by Bob Hope during the show's finale to a standing ovation and the star-studded audience singing God Bless America back to her. In January 1986, Smith's right leg was amputated due to poor circulation caused by diabetes. Five months later, she underwent a mastectomy. On June 17, 1986, Smith died of respiratory arrest at Raleigh Community Hospital in Raleigh at the age of 79.

Patricia Castledine (1939–2021) was Smith's live-in nurse until Smith's death. Castledine became the president of the Kate Smith Fan Club after Smith's death and continued to hold that post until her own death in 2021.

For more than a year after her death, Smith's remains were stored in a vault at St. Agnes Cemetery in Lake Placid, while officials of St. Agnes Church and the singer's executors engaged in a dispute over Smith's request to be interred in a mausoleum on the cemetery's grounds. Her private interment service was held on November 14, 1987.

== Legacy ==
Smith did a command performance for King George VI and Queen Elizabeth at the White House on June 8, 1939. She received a Drake University medallion for "outstanding contributions to radio and the people". Smith was inducted posthumously into the Radio Hall of Fame in 1999. She was inducted into the North Carolina Music Hall of Fame in 2009. In 2010, the U.S. postal service issued a commemorative stamp featuring a duplication of artwork created for the cover of a CD titled Kate Smith: The Songbird of the South. The artwork was based on a photograph of Smith taken in the 1960s.

=== Presidential Medal of Freedom ===
On October 26, 1982, Smith received the Presidential Medal of Freedom, America's highest civilian honor, by U.S. President Ronald Reagan. In bestowing the honor, Reagan said:

The voice of Kate Smith is known and loved by millions of Americans, young and old. In war and peace, it has been an inspiration. Those simple but deeply moving words, "God bless America", have taken on added meaning for all of us because of the way Kate Smith sang them. Thanks to her they have become a cherished part of all our lives, an undying reminder of the beauty, the courage, and the heart of this great land of ours. In giving us a magnificent, selfless talent like Kate Smith, God has truly blessed America.

It was not the first time Smith had been saluted by a president. In 1969, in light of Jim Morrison's arrest in Miami for indecent exposure, Smith had performed with The Lettermen, Anita Bryant, and Jackie Gleason in a concert demonstration against indecency, for which President Richard Nixon commended the stars' performances.
