= Three Wonderful Letters from Home =

1918 song written by Ballard MacDonald and Joe Goodwin and composed by James F. Hanley

Song
- Language: English
- Published: 1918
- Composer(s): James F. Hanley
- Lyricist(s): Ballard MacDonald; Joe Goodwin

"Three Wonderful Letters from Home" is a World War I song written by Ballard MacDonald & Joe Goodwin and composed by James F. Hanley. The song was first published in 1918 by Shapiro, Bernstein & Co., in New York City. The sheet music cover, illustrated by Albert Wilfred Barbelle, depicts a mother, wife, and daughter writing letters with marching troops and a plane, ship, and tank in the background.

This song was in the top 20 charts from May to July 1918 and reached No. 13 in June. It was recorded by both Charles Hart and Henry Burr. Also on the disc was the song "Daddy Mine" by Lew Wilson and Alfred Dubin.

The sheet music can be found at the Pritzker Military Museum & Library.
