= Statue of Kate Smith =

Bronze sculpture in Philadelphia, Pennsylvania

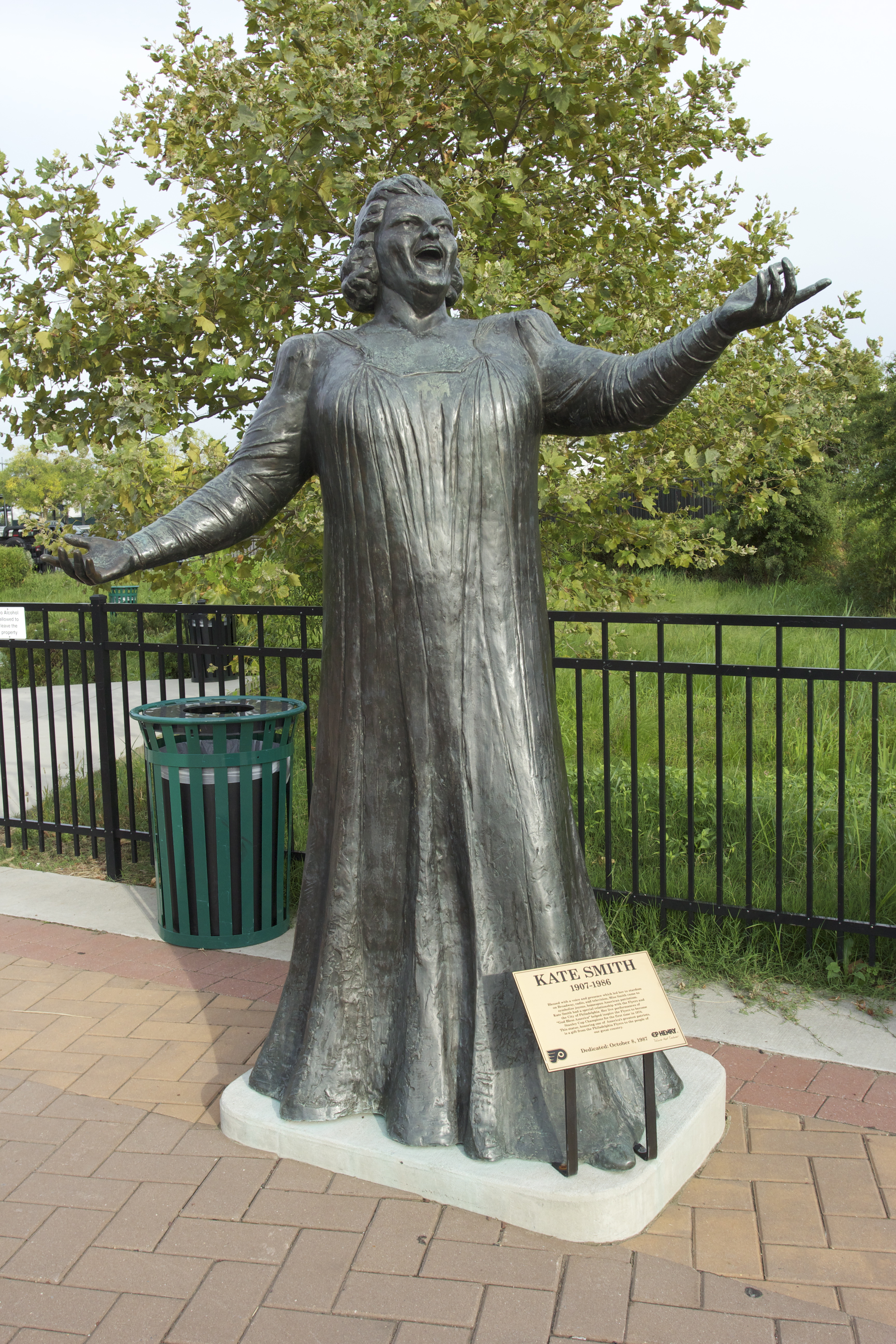
- The statue in 2017
- Artist: Marc Mellon
- Year: 1987
- Medium: Bronze sculpture
- Subject: Kate Smith
- Location: Philadelphia, Pennsylvania, U.S.; 39°54′15.59″N 75°10′9.73″W

A statue of singer Kate Smith (1907–1986) by Marc Mellon was installed outside Philadelphia's Stateside Live!, in the U.S. state of Pennsylvania, until 2019 when it was removed due to Smith having previously performed songs with racially insensitive lyrics.

== Description and history ==
The 8-foot (2.4 m) bronze sculpture was commissioned by the Philadelphia Flyers and unveiled on October 8, 1987, a year after Smith's death. The statue was erected as a tribute to Smith as a result of her regularly singing "God Bless America" before Flyers games during the 1970s. Smith first sang the pre-game song in 1969 because the team owner wanted it instead of "The Star Spangled Banner" when fans exhibited ambivalence toward the national anthem.

The statue was placed in storage in 2010 because of the demolition of the Spectrum arena. It was later reinstalled outside the newly built Philly Live! arena.

On April 21, 2019, the statue was removed due to the controversy of some Smith's renditions of songs that contained racist language, including "That's Why Darkies Were Born" and "Pickaninny Heaven".

Flyers' General Manager Paul Holmgren announced the move, stating: "The NHL principle ‘Hockey is for Everyone’ is at the heart of everything the Flyers stand for. As a result, we cannot stand idle while material from another era gets in the way of who we are today". Her family responded by denying the allegations and argued that Paul Robeson popularized some of those songs, and that they were satirical in nature. The Flyers and the New York Yankees baseball team also announced that they would no longer play recordings of Smith's versions of "God Bless America" as a result.

== See also ==
- 1987 in art
