= Honeymoon Lane (film) =

1931 film

- Theatrical release poster
- Directed by: William James Craft
- Screenplay by: Eddie Dowling; Jack Jevne; Barney A. Sarecky
- Based on: Honeymoon Lane by Eddie Dowling and James F. Hanley
- Produced by: Eddie Dowling; George W. Weeks
- Starring: Eddie Dowling; June Collyer; Raymond Hatton
- Cinematography: Gilbert Warrenton
- Edited by: Doris Drought
- Music by: Abe Meyer
- Production company: Sono-Art Productions
- Distributed by: Paramount Pictures
- Release date: July 25, 1931
- Running time: 71 minutes
- Country: United States
- Language: English

Honeymoon Lane is a 1931 American pre-Code comedy film directed by William James Craft and starring Eddie Dowling, June Collyer, Raymond Hatton. The film was released on July 25, 1931, by Paramount Pictures. It is based on the 1926 Broadway musical of the same title by Dowling and James F. Hanley.

== Plot ==
Card dealer Tim Dugan falls in love with Mary, the niece of owner of the casino where he works. Complications ensue when he is accused of allowing a female customer to win big and is fired from his job.

== Cast ==
- Eddie Dowling as Tim Dugan
- June Collyer as Mary Baggott
- Raymond Hatton as Dynamite
- Ray Dooley as Gerty Murphy
- Noah Beery, Sr. as Tom Baggott
- Mary Carr as Mother Murphy
- Armand Kaliz as King of Bulgravia
- Adolph Milar as Paulino
- Lloyd Whitlock as Arnold Bookstein
- George Kotsonaros as Nolay
- Corliss Palmer as Betty Royce
- Walter Brennan as Driver
- Gene Lewis as Col. Gustave
- Ethel Wales as Mrs. Gotrocks

== Bibliography ==
- Bradley, Edwin M. The First Hollywood Musicals: A Critical Filmography of 171 Features, 1927 through 1932. McFarland, 2004.
