= Gordon Dooley =

American comedian (1898–1930)

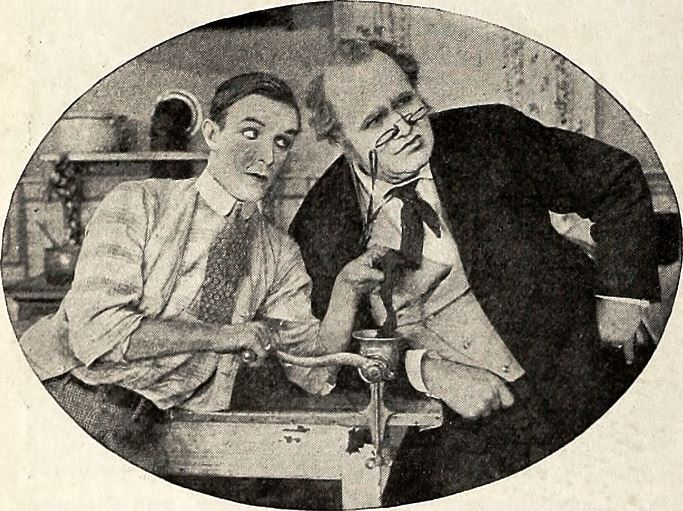
Dooley (left) and Edward Kimball in the comedy film A Rag, a Bone and a Hank of Hair (1917)

James Gordon Dooley (13 August 1898 - 23 January 1930) was an American comedian, actor, dancer, singer, and acrobat. A member of the Dooley family of performers, he grew up as a child performer in vaudeville in the early part of the 20th century. When the Dooley family act broke up in 1917, he ventured out as a solo performer and became a successful musical theatre actor, dancer, and singer active on Broadway from 1919 through 1928. He also performed in three silent films.

== Life and career ==
Dooley with his wife and vaudeville partner, Martha Morton

Born into the well known Dooley family of entertainers, James Gordon Dooley, known as Gordon, was born in Altoona, Pennsylvania on August 13, 1898. He was the son of Robert Roger Dooley (originally Dool), and his wife, Mary, both emigrants from Scotland. His father was a famous circus clown. His two brothers, William (1882-1921) and Johnny (1887-1928), and his two sisters, Ray (1891-1984) and May (1892-1947), were all performers. Gordon was the youngest of the Dooley children and the only one not born in Scotland.

Beginning very young, Gordon grew up performing in vaudeville as a member of Dooley's family's act. He and his brothers developed skills as comedic acrobats. He also became a skilled eccentric dancer. When May left the Dooley act to get married in 1917, the family act broke apart and the Dooley siblings went their own separate ways, although Gordon would occasionally perform with one or more of his siblings in other ventures.

Gordon made his Broadway debut in 1917 at the Fulton Theatre as Whirlwind Inbad in Raymond Hitchcock and E. Ray Goetz's musical Words and Music. In 1919 he returned to Broadway as Wilbur in Sigmund Romberg, Jean Schwartz, and Harold Atteridge's musical Monte Cristo Jr. in which he scored a hit with critics and the public in the "Apache Dance" which he performed with his brother William. He was also featured in that musical singing the song "Are You Stepping Out Tonight?" He subsequently appeared in the Broadway musical revues The Greenwich Village Follies (1921), George White's Scandals (1925), Honeymoon Lane (1926), and The Earl Carroll Vanities (1928). In George White's Scandals he gave a hilarious impersonation of George Gershwin,, and his funny pratfalling stunts in Honeymoon Lane were well received by audiences.

On screen, Dooley played the doll in the charade scene of the 1922 feature-length silent film Beauty's Worth; a Paramount Pictures movie directed by Robert G. Vignola and starring Marion Davies. He also appeared in two short films: A Rag, a Bone and a Hank of Hair (1917) and Palm Missed (1921).

Dooley married Martha Morton of the Four Mortons in 1922 and they toured as the team of Dooley and Morton. He suffered a nervous breakdown in May 1929. He died of pneumonia in Philadelphia, the next year at age 31, and was buried in Holy Cross Cemetery in Yeadon, Pennsylvania.
