= Monte Cristo Jr. =

Monte Cristo Jr. may refer to:

- Monte Cristo Jr. (Victorian burlesque), first performed in 1886 by Henry, Lutz, Caryll, et al.
- Monte Cristo Jr. (musical), 1919 musical by Romberg, Schwartz, & Atteridge
