= Sam Morton =

Sam Morton may refer to:

- Samantha Morton, English actress and musician
- Sam Morton (ice hockey), American ice hockey center
- Sam Morton, patriarch of The Four Mortons vaudeville team
