= Harry M. Woods =

American songwriter and pianist (1896–1970)

- Born: Henry MacGregor Woods; November 4, 1896; North Chelmsford, Massachusetts, United States
- Died: January 14, 1970 (aged 73) Glendale, Arizona, United States
- Occupations: Songwriter, pianist
- Instrument: Piano

Harry MacGregor Woods (November 4, 1896 – January 14, 1970) was an American Tin Pan Alley songwriter and pianist. He was a composer of numerous film scores.

== Early life ==
Woods was born in North Chelmsford, Massachusetts. Despite the fact that he was born with a deformed left hand (which still had fingers), Woods' mother, a concert singer, encouraged him to play the piano.

Woods earned his bachelor's degree at Harvard University, supporting himself by singing in church choirs and giving piano recitals.

== Career ==
After graduation, he settled in Cape Cod and began life as a farmer. Woods was drafted into the army during World War I, and that is when he began cultivating his talent for songwriting. After his discharge, Woods settled in New York City and began his career as a songwriter.

Woods' first songwriting success came in 1923 with the song "I'm Goin' South", written with Abner Silver. It became a hit song in 1924 for Al Jolson. The same year, "Paddlin' Madelin Home" was published, with words and music by Woods.

With Mort Dixon and Billy Rose, Woods composed "I Wish't I Was in Peoria", now a Dixieland jazz standard, in 1925.

By 1926, Woods was an established songwriter on Tin Pan Alley and would become legendary with his new song "When the Red, Red Robin (Comes Bob, Bob, Bobbin' Along)". The song was an instant hit for singers such as "Whispering" Jack Smith and Cliff Edwards. It was Jolson, though, who had the most success with his recording of the song. The song was recorded in 1953 by Doris Day and again achieved considerable success.

In 1929, Woods began contributing songs to Hollywood musicals such as The Vagabond Lover, A Lady's Morals, Artistic Temper, Aunt Sally, Twentieth Century, Road House, Limelight, It's Love Again, Merry Go Round of 1938, and She's For Me. In 1934, he moved to London, where he lived for three years, and worked for the British film studio Gaumont British, contributing to the films Jack Ahoy and Evergreen.

While Woods usually wrote both words and music for his songs, he also collaborated with Mort Dixon, Al Sherman, Howard Johnson, Arthur Freed, Rube Bloom, Billy Moll and Gus Kahn. Alone, or with his collaborators, Woods wrote "I'm Looking Over a Four Leaf Clover", "I'm Goin' South", "The Clouds Will Soon Roll By", "Just a Butterfly that's Caught in the Rain", "Side by Side", "My Old Man", "A Little Kiss Each Morning", "Heigh-Ho, Everybody, Heigh-Ho", "Man From the South", "River Stay 'way from My Door", "When the Moon Comes Over the Mountain", "We Just Couldn't Say Goodbye", "Just an Echo in the Valley", "Hang Out the Stars in Indiana", "A Little Street Where Old Friends Meet", "You Ought to See Sally on Sunday", "Hustlin' and Bustlin' for Baby", "What a Little Moonlight Can Do", "Try a Little Tenderness", "I'll Never Say 'Never Again' Again", "Over My Shoulder" (Jessie Matthews' signature song, as used in her film Evergreen), "Tinkle Tinkle Tinkle", "When You've Got a Little Springtime in Your Heart", "Midnight, the Stars and You", "I Nearly Let Love Go Slipping Through My Fingers", and many others.

== Personal life and death ==
Woods and his wife Barbara had three sons: Ralph, John and David. Woods was known for his temper and his drinking. David Jasen, writing in Tin Pan Alley, wrote that Woods was observed assaulting a customer at a bar who he got into an argument with. "Who is that horrible man?, a woman asked. A companion of Woods replied, "That's Harry Woods. He wrote 'Try A Little Tenderness'".

Around 1945, Woods retired. He and his wife relocated to Phoenix, Arizona. Woods died on the night of January 14, 1970, after being struck by a car outside his house. He was 73.

== Selected filmography ==
Year	Film/Show	Song
1931	CBS TV Inaugural Broadcast (TV Movie)	"When the Moon Comes Over the Mountain"
1931	Swanee River	"River, Stay 'Way from My Door"
1932	Speaking of Operations (Short)	"We Just Couldn't Say Goodbye"
1932	Wish I Had Wings (Short)	"I Wish I Had Wings"
1932	You're Too Careless with Your Kisses! (Short)	"You're Too Careless with Your Kisses"
1932	Rudy Vallee Melodies (Short)	"A Little Kiss Each Morning"
1932	Veiled Aristocrats	"River, Stay 'Way from My Door"
1932	When the Red, Red, Robin Comes Bob, Bob Bobbin' Along (Short)	"When the Red, Red, Robin Comes Bob, Bob, Bobbin' Along"
1932	Battling Bosko (Short)	"In the Shanty Where Santy Claus Lives"
1933	Sing with the Street Singer (Short)	"River Stay Away From My Door"
1934	Thunder Over Texas	"When the Moon Comes Over the Mountain"
1934	Jack Ahoy	"My Hat's on the Side of My Head"
1934	Just an Echo (Short)	"Just an Echo in the Valley"
1935	Our Gang Follies of 1936 (Short)	"I'll Never Say 'Never Again' Again"
1935	Devil Dogs of the Air	"Midnight, the Stars and You"
1937	Merry-Go-Round of 1938	"River, Stay 'Way From My Door"
1937	Underworld	"I'll Never say 'Never Again' Again "
1937	Backstage	"The Whistling Waltz"
