= Hang Out the Stars in Indiana =

"Hang Out the Stars in Indiana" is a song written by American songwriters Harry M. Woods (music) and Billy Moll (lyrics). Copyright for the song was renewed on January 30, 1931, so its composition date preceded this. The first recorded version of the song was on March 27, 1931, by Roy Evans on Columbia Records. The song has been used several times in movies.

== Al Bowlly version ==
On August 25, 1931, a version was recorded in London, with Al Bowlly as vocalist, accompanied by Ray Noble and his New Mayfair Dance Orchestra. This version was used by film director Bruce Robinson in his 1987 film, Withnail and I. It also features in the soundtrack of the 2020 film Six Minutes to Midnight.

== Suggs version ==
The 2008 film The Edge of Love, starring Keira Knightley, Sienna Miller, Cillian Murphy and Matthew Rhys, featured pop singer Suggs (credited as Graham McPherson) as crooner Al Bowlly. He sings "Hang Out the Stars in Indiana" in a scene filmed in a nightclub. Knightley also briefly sings the song in another scene.

== Other versions ==
Early 1930s versions were recorded by Melville Gideon with Orchestra, Sydney Baynes and his Radio Dance Band, The Blue Jays (featuring Al Bowlly), the White Star Syncopators and others.
