= Ballard MacDonald =

American lyricist (1882–1935)

Ballard MacDonald (October 15, 1882 – November 17, 1935) was an American lyricist, who was one of the writers of Tin Pan Alley.

Born in Portland, Oregon, he was a charter member of the American Society of Composers, Authors and Publishers (ASCAP).

MacDonald wrote lyrics for a song called "Play That Barber-Shop Chord" in 1910, which became a hit with revised lyrics when it was sung in the Ziegfeld Follies by vaudeville star Bert Williams. He subsequently worked with composer Harry Carroll on "On the Mississippi" (1912) and "The Trail of the Lonesome Pine" (1912, based on the novel of the same name). He also partnered with James F. Hanley, which produced the 1917 hit "(Back Home Again in) Indiana".

In the early 1920s, MacDonald turned his attention to Broadway revues, which in 1924 brought him his most notable musical collaborator in George Gershwin. In 1921 he wrote the lyrics to the musical Love Birds. In 1926, MacDonald teamed up with Walter Donaldson to write songs for the Broadway show Sweetheart Time.

Thumbs Up! was MacDonald's final Broadway show. He died in Forest Hills, New York.

== Songs ==
- 1912 "On the Mississippi" with Harry Carroll
- 1912 "The Trail of the Lonesome Pine" with Harry Carroll
- 1914 "Fatherland, the Motherland, the Land of My Best Girl" (m: Harry Carroll)
- 1914 "Tip-Top Tipperary Mary" (m: Harry Carroll)
- 1914 "War in Snider's Grocery Store" with Hank Hancock & Harry Carroll
- 1915 "I Wanna Be the Captain or I Won't Play" (m: Alfred Von Tilzer)
- 1915 "Is That You O'Reilly?"
- 1915 "Played by a Military Band" (m: Halsey K. Mohr)
- 1916 "War Babies" with Edward Madden (m: James F. Hanley)
- 1917 "Back Home Again In" with James F. Hanley
- 1917 "Mister Butterfly" (m: Leo Edwards)
- 1917 "Never Forget to Write Home" (m: James F. Hanley)
- 1917 "Ragtime Volunteers Are Off to War" (m: James F. Hanley)
- 1917 "We'll Be There, on the Land, on the Sea, in the Air" (m: James F. Hanley)
- 1918 "At the Dixie Military Ball" (m: Harry Carroll)
- 1918 "Don't You Go and Worry, Mary" (m: Halsey K. Mohr)
- 1918 "Dreaming of Home Sweet Home" (m: James F. Hanley)
- 1918 "Father Will Be with Us Soon" (m: Nat Osborne)
- 1918 "I've Got a Ten Day Pass for a Honeymoon (With the Girl I Left Behind)" with Walter Donaldson (m: James F. Hanley)
- 1918 "Little Bit of Sunshine (From Home)" with Joe Goodwin (m: James F. Hanley)
- 1918 "Magic in Your Big Blue Eyes" (m: Nat Osborne)
- 1918 "Strolling 'Round the Camp with Mary" (m: Nat Osborne)
- 1918 "Three Wonderful Letters from Home" with Joe Goodwin (m: James F. Hanley)
- 1918 "With the Rose (I Send This Heart of Mine)" (m: Nat Osborne)
- 1919 "Another Good Man Gone Wrong" (m: Nat Osborne)
- 1919 "M'sieur Jimmie (Come and Shake Ze Shimmy)" (m: Nat Osborne)
- 1919 "On a Little Farm in Normandie" (m: Nat Osborne)
- 1920 "I Was a Florodora Baby" with Harry Carroll

== Selective list of song credits ==
- "Beautiful Ohio" (MacDonald/Robert A. King), 1918
- "Rose of Washington Square" (MacDonald/James F. Hanley)
- "The Parade of the Wooden Soldiers" (MacDonald/Leon Jessel), 1922
- "Back Home Again in Indiana" (MacDonald/James F. Hanley), 1917
- The Trail of the Lonesome Pine" (MacDonald/Harry Carroll), 1913
- "Play That Barbershop Chord"
- "Clap Hands! Here Comes Charley!"
- "Somebody Loves Me"
- "Bend Down, Sister"
- "Down in Bom Bombay"
- "On the Mississippi"
- "There's a Light That's Burning in the Window of the Little House Upon the Hill"
