= The Four Fords =

American dance team

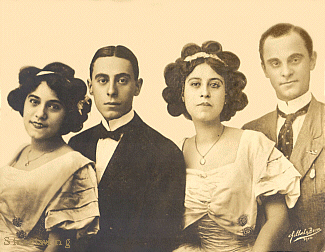
The Four Fords, vaudeville dance act

The Four Fords, also known as the Four Dancing Fords, were a group of American dancers active in the early 1900s. The group was composed of four siblings, Max, Edwin, Dora and Mabel Ford.

The Ford children learned to dance at an early age. Eventually, the children became a vaudeville dance act. They clog danced, tap danced, and soft shoe danced (An Art of Infinite Variety). The Four Fords became popular around 1910. Over the next three years, they toured in England, the Netherlands, Ireland, and Germany.

In 1913, the Four Fords broke up. Mable and Dora toured as the Ford Sisters. Max Ford toured with Hetty Urma-Ford, his second wife (Watson). It is believed that Max became a movie choreographer.

== See also ==
- The Four Mortons
