= The Four Mortons =

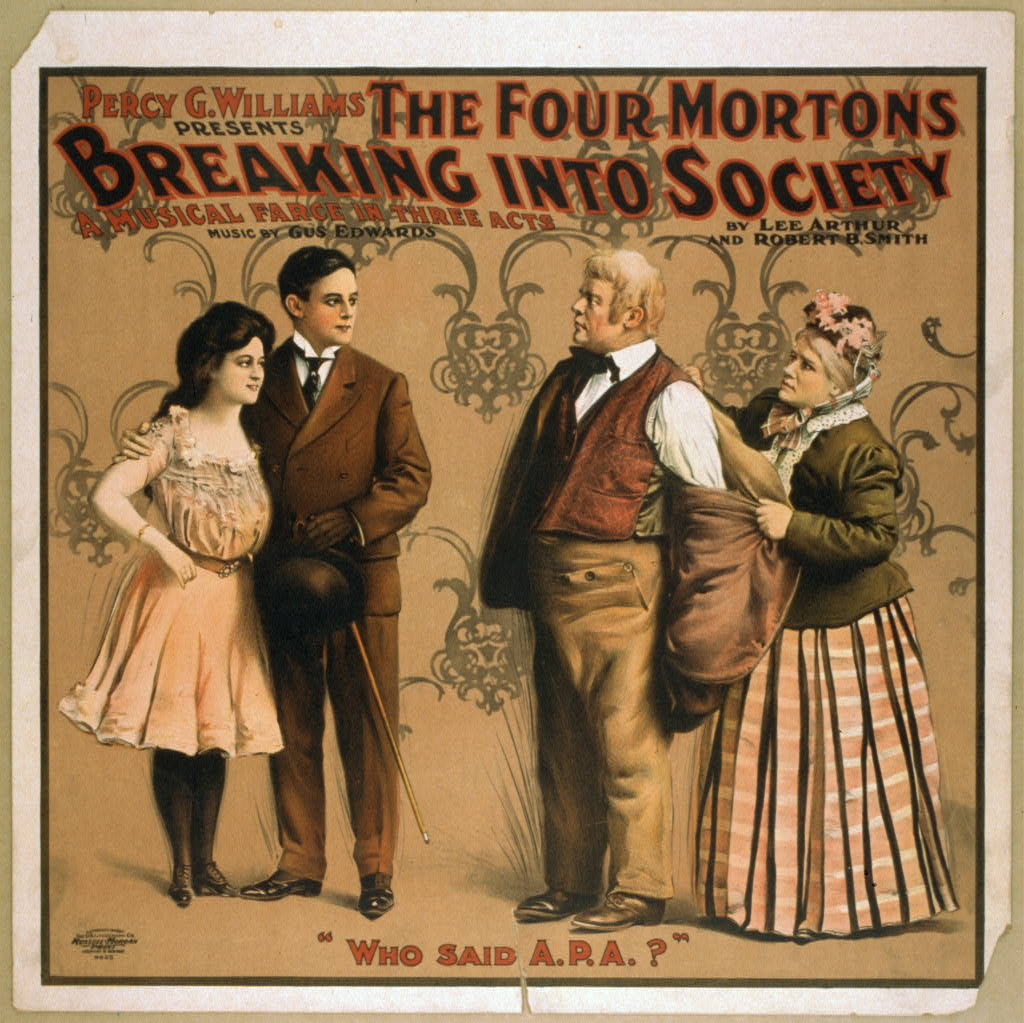
The Four Mortons (Clara, Paul, Sam, and Kitty) in Breaking into Society

The Four Mortons was an American vaudeville team during the early twentieth century. The act originally consisted of Sam Morton (né Kennedy), his wife, Kitty, and their children Clara and Paul Moton, who were later replaced by younger children Martha and Joe. The original team appeared on Broadway in Percy G. Williams' musical Breaking into Society and George V. Hobart's The Big Stick. The Four Mortons performed in various combinations until the death of Kitty in 1927, and in occasional other partnerships until Sam Morton's death in 1941.

Samuel Paul Kennedy (1862–1941) and Catherine "Kitty" Condon (1863–1927), were both born in the Corktown neighborhood of Detroit, Michigan. They were married in 1881, and Clara Louise was born the next year, followed by Paul (Samuel Paul Kennedy Jr.), Marion, Martha, and Joseph, of whom all but Marion went into show business. Sam and Kitty took on the stage name Morton and toured as an Irish dancing duo, before Clara joined their act in 1901 and Paul joined shortly after.

In 1912 the Mortons announced the foursome would dissolve as an act at the end of the season, with Sam and Kitty continuing as a double act.

In 1917 Martha and Joe were announced as new members of the second edition of the Four Mortons. Martha later married Gordon Dooley, with whom she appeared in the musical Honeymoon Lane. After Dooley's 1930 death, Martha teamed with Bobby Watson and Eddie Parks and married golfer Walter Grego.

Clara died in Detroit on May 2, 1948. Paul died in the same city on October 8, 1958.

== See also ==
- The Four Cohans
- The Four Fords
