= There's a Light That's Burning in the Window of the Little House Upon the Hill =

"There's a Light Burning in the Window of the Little House Upon the Hill"
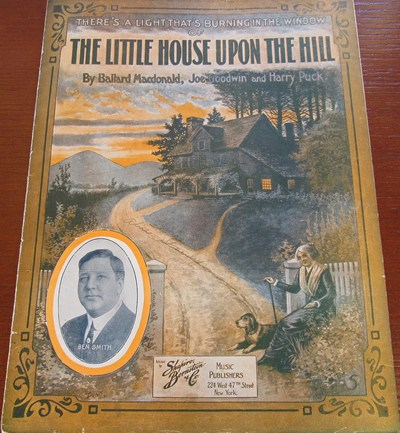
- Sheet music cover found at the Pritzker Military Museum & Library

Song
- Released: 1915
- Label: Shapiro, Bernstein & Co.
- Songwriter(s): Composer: Joe Goodwin and Harry Puck; Lyricist: Ballard MacDonald

"There's a Light That's Burning in the Window of the Little House Upon the Hill" is a World War I era song released in 1915. Joe Goodwin and Harry Puck composed the music. Ballard MacDonald wrote the lyrics. Shapiro, Bernstein & Co. of New York, New York published the song. It was written for both voice and piano.

Walter M. Dunk designed the sheet music cover. It features an elderly woman and her dog sitting near a white picket fence and a dirt road that leads to a house. On the bottom left is an inset photo, which differs depending on the version, of either Belle Rutland, Bob Buchanan, or Ben Smith.

The song is told from the point of view of a soldier, who is feeling lonely. What helps him pull through is envisioning his mother waiting for him and a light burning in their house's window. This image adds to the song's hopeful tone. The chorus is as follows:

There's a light that's burning in the window
Of a little house upon the hill
And the light will burn
And a heart will yearn
And it will till I return
For there's only one mother
I know she's waiting still
And she'll always keep the light burning
in the window of the little house upon the hill

The sheet music can be found at Pritzker Military Museum & Library.
