= Ice Cream (I Scream, You Scream, We All Scream for Ice Cream) =

1927 song by Howard Johnson, Billy Moll and Robert A. King

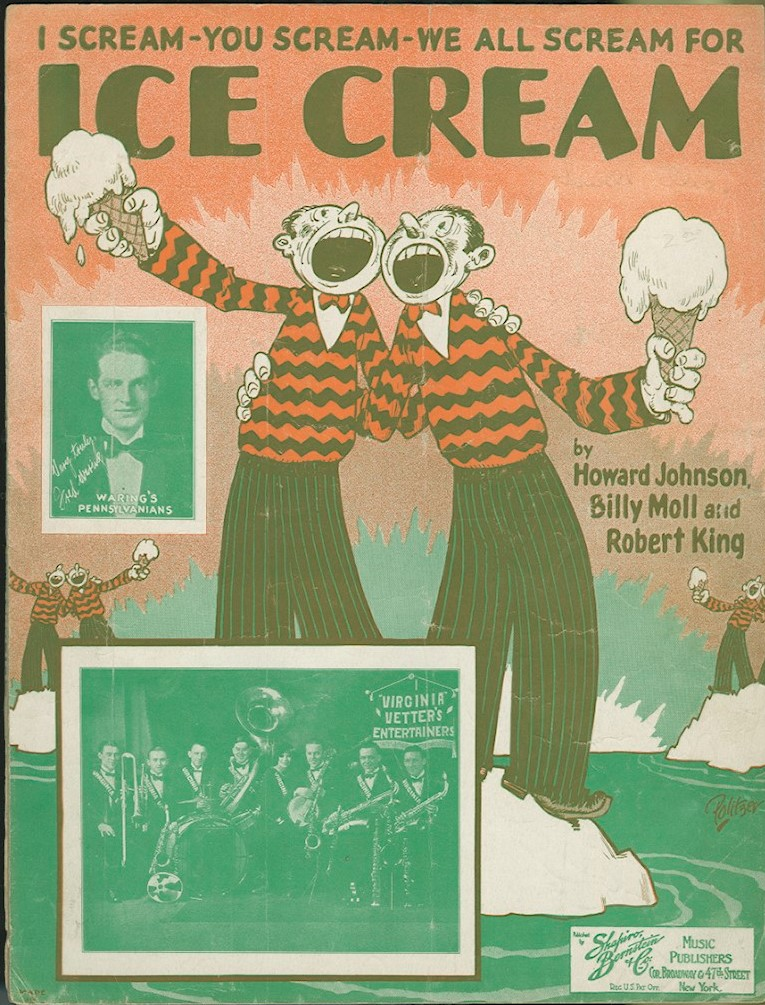
Sheet music cover

"Ice Cream" or "I Scream, You Scream, We All Scream for Ice Cream" is a popular song, first published in 1927, with words and music by Howard Johnson, Billy Moll, and Robert A. King. After initial success as a late 1920s novelty song, the tune became a traditional jazz standard while the refrain "I Scream, You Scream, We All Scream for Ice Cream" has remained a part of popular culture even without the rest of the song.

On January 1, 2023, the song went into the public domain.

== 1920s novelty song ==
The song was one of a series of comic novelty songs set in "exotic" locations, one of the earliest and most famous being "Oh By Jingo!" The verses of "Ice Cream" talk of a fictional college in "the land of ice and snow, up among the Eskimo", the college cheer being the chorus of the song "I Scream, You Scream, We All Scream for Ice Cream".

Notable recordings of the tune in the 1920s include by Waring's Pennsylvanians for Victor, Harry Reser's Syncopators for Columbia, and The Revelers for Edison Records.

== Traditional jazz standard ==
In New Orleans in 1944, William Russell recorded a small jazz combo with George Lewis and Jim Robinson for his American Music label. Robinson cut loose with an unexpectedly virtuosic performance on an instrumental of the tune "Ice Cream". The side was issued as by "Jim Robinson's Band". The tune became a standard for Robinson, imitated by other Dixieland jazz trombonists including Chris Barber, and remains in the traditional jazz repertoire.

When Barber's band first recorded the song in 1954, they basically knew the instrumental Lewis version. The record producer asked them to sing it, which was slightly problematic, since they didn't know the full lyrics. So trumpeter Pat Halcox invented his own lyrics; these are nowadays better known than the original 1920s version.
