= David N. Thomas =

British writer (born 1945)

David N. Thomas (born 1945) is a British writer.

David Thomas was brought up in Pontarddulais and Port Talbot in south Wales. He studied at Balliol College, Oxford, and the London School of Economics, before working as a community worker in London. He was subsequently a lecturer at the National Institute for Social Work and then Chief Executive at the Community Development Foundation. He was also a founder member of the European Community Development Network, and a Council of Europe Fellow. He has published widely on community development, including Skills in Neighbourhood Work, written with Paul Henderson.

Thomas retired back to Wales in the early 1990s, and since then has written about the life and death of Dylan Thomas. He has published extensively about Thomas’ associations with both New Quay in Cardiganshire (Ceredigion), and the Llansteffan peninsula in Carmarthenshire. His first book on Thomas, A Farm, Two Mansions and a Bungalow, was published in 2000. The film rights were sold to make The Edge of Love.

== Selected Works on Dylan Thomas ==
Dylan Thomas: A Farm, Two Mansions and a Bungalow, Seren, 2000

The Dylan Thomas Murders, Seren, 2002.

The Dylan Thomas Trail, Y Lolfa, 2002

Dylan Remembered 1914–1934, vol 1, Seren, 2003

Dylan Remembered 1935–1953, vol 2, Seren, 2004

Fatal Neglect: Who Killed Dylan Thomas?, Seren, 2008

The Death of Dylan Thomas, in the Western Mail, November 1, 2008

Dylan Thomas and The Edge of Love, in Cambria, February 2013

A True Childhood: Dylan's Peninsularity, in Dylan Thomas: A Centenary Celebration, ed. by Hannah Ellis, Bloomsbury, 2014

A Postcard from New Quay in Dylan Thomas: A Centenary Celebration, ed. by Hannah Ellis, Bloomsbury, 2014
