= Flore Revalles =

Swiss entertainer (1889–1966)

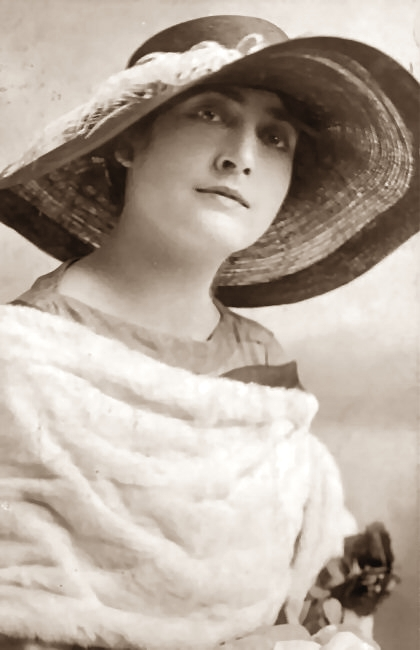
- Revalles circa 1918
- Born: Emily Flora Treichler; January 25, 1889; Rolle, Switzerland
- Died: August 29, 1966 (aged 77); Geneva, Switzerland
- Occupations: Singer, dancer, and actress

Flore (or Flora) Revalles (January 25, 1889 – August 29, 1966) was a Swiss entertainer active over the early decades of the twentieth century. Revalles began as a singer in Switzerland, danced with the Ballets Russes in Europe and America and appeared in Broadway and Hollywood productions before resuming her singing career in Europe. She is also remembered for being an aunt of the French film star Guy Tréjan (1921–2001).

== Life and career ==
Emily Flora Treichler was born in Rolle, Switzerland, a small town nestled along the northwestern banks of Lake Geneva. By her mid-twenties Revalles was a singer at the Grand Théâtre de Genève until the set and costume designer Léon Bakst enticed her to join the European tour of Diaghilev’s Ballets Russes in productions such as Cleopatra, Thamar and Scheherazade.

In January 1916, Diaghilev brought his troupe to New York for a two-week engagement at the Century Theatre and a four-week run at the Metropolitan Opera House. At the Met that April, Revalles danced with Vaslav Nijinsky in the final dance of Till Eulenspiegel. Nijinsky, the star of the Ballets Russes, debut had been delayed for several weeks while negotiations were afoot to release him from an Austrian prisoner of war camp. Over her time in America, Revalles took part in a number of patriotic events in New York to benefit Allied soldiers. Soon after their New York engagements, the Ballets Russes embarked on an extensive tour of America.

Flore Revalles is her name and she plays in most of the ballets, among them in the ancient story of the snake lady of the Nile, Cleopatra. Flore Revalles is a person all soft curves and long sinuous lines with dark Egyptian coloring and all the attributes of a well regulated vampire. In the story from which the ballet is taken a humble slave dares to love Cleopatra. At first the whole court with the queen stand aghast and astounded at the presumption of the slave; but, swayed by a whim, yields to him for a brief and delirious hour and then kills him with a strange and terrible poison. Galveston Daily News, November 26, 1916

Revalles made headlines in the United States in October 1916 after revealing she had adopted a cobra to help perfect her Cleopatra dance, stating “the cobra is the most graceful of all snakes.”

During her stay in America Revalles appeared in two Broadway productions, Miss 1917, a musical revue that had a fair run at the Century Theatre before the theatre fell into bankruptcy, and the Shubert Brothers’ 1919 hit musical extravaganza Monte Cristo Jr., playing the multiple roles of Yvonne, Haydee and Diamonda, over its near year-long run at the Winter Garden Theatre.

She also played in at least two American motion pictures, playing Messalina in Woman—a 1918 film that attempts to tell the story of womankind from Eve to the present day, a story some found risqué—and Daisy Rittenshaw in the 1920 picture Earthbound, in which her husband murders his best friend after discovering their affair. Later her lover returns as a ghost unable to move on until he helps those he’d wronged.

In the early 1920s Revalles decided to return to Europe to resume her singing career. She eventually chose to retire in the mid-1930s to Geneva, Switzerland, where she died in 1966 at the age of 77.

== Gallery ==
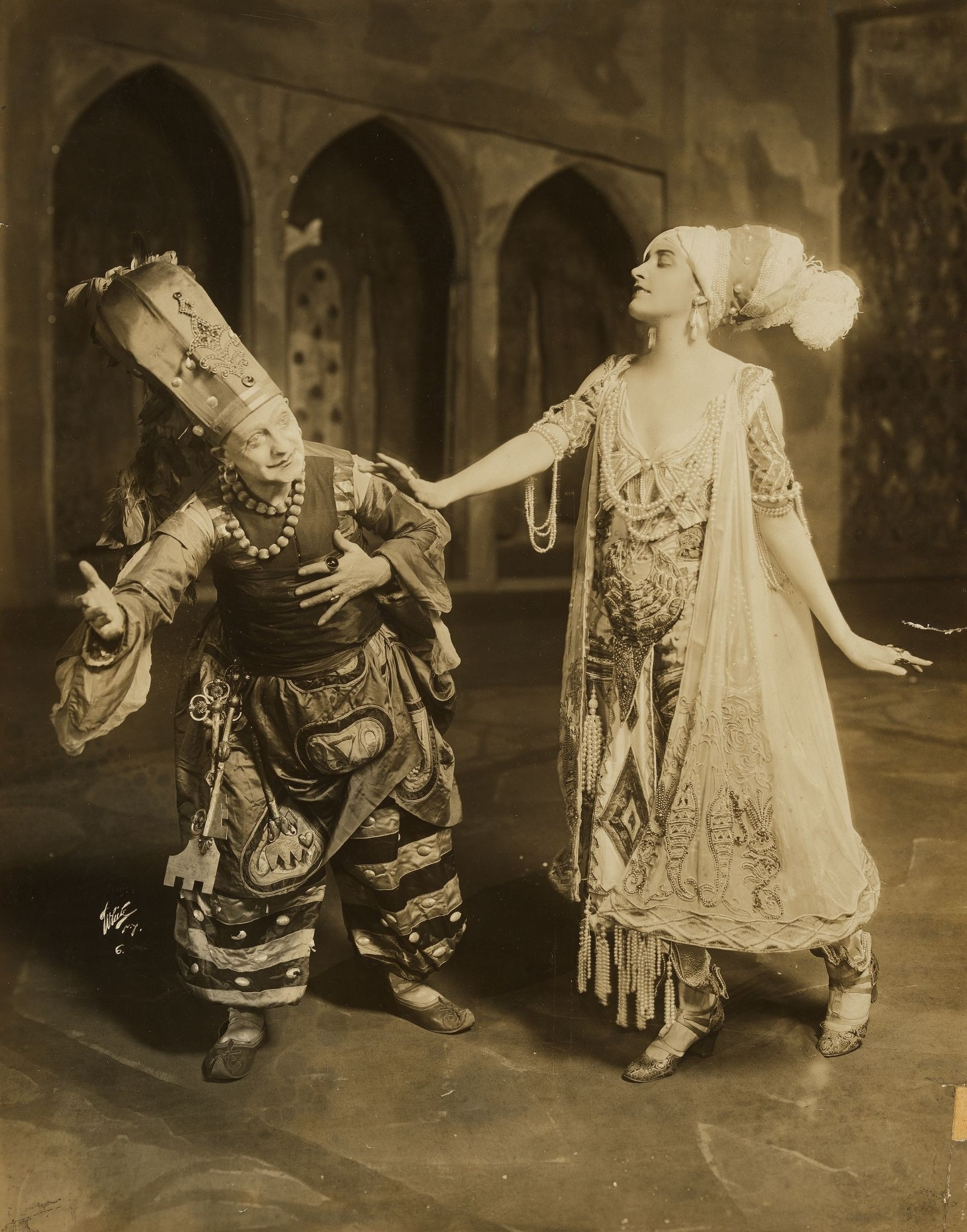
Photograph for Schéhérazade, 1916: Enrico Cecchetti and Flore Revalles as Eunuch and Zobeide

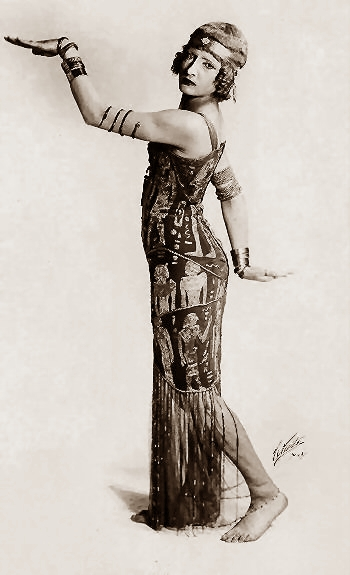
Revalles circa 1916

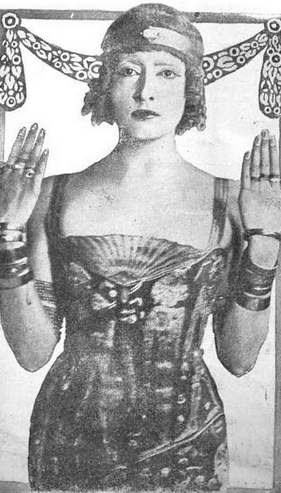
Flora Revalles as Cleopatra, from a 1916 publication
