= When the Moon Comes over the Mountain =

1931 song by Harry M. Woods and Howard Johnson

"When the Moon Comes Over the Mountain"

Single by Kate Smith with Ben Selvin Orchestra
- B-side: If I Have to Go on Without You
- Published: February 28, 1931 by Robbins Music Corp., Inc., New York
- Released: September 1931
- Recorded: August 17, 1931
- Studio: Columbia Records, 55 Fifth Avenue, New York City
- Genre: Pop music
- Length: 3:11
- Label: Columbia 2516-D
- Songwriter(s): Kate Smith
- Composer(s): Harry M. Woods
- Lyricist(s): Howard E. Johnson

"When the Moon Comes Over the Mountain" is a popular song, published in 1931, and credited as written by Howard Johnson, Harry M. Woods, and Kate Smith. As Johnson is primarily known as a lyricist and Woods, when collaborating with lyricists, primarily wrote music, the actual apportionment of the credits would be likely to be music by Woods, lyrics by Johnson, and possibly some small contribution by Smith in order to give her a share of royalty income. The song had its copyright renewed in 1958. (Note: Under R209254 and others)

== In popular culture ==
This song featured briefly, sung by Groucho Marx during the breakfast scene in the 1935 film A Night at the Opera when Groucho receives a visit from Police Sergeant Henderson. In typical Groucho humour Groucho sings the words "When the moon comes over the mountain - and the mountain comes over the moon" just as Henderson enters the room!

In the Three Stooges film short "Dizzy Doctors" from 1937 Moe Howard gets on a PA system and says "Hello everybody, we just brought the moon over the mountain." in reference to this song.

This is the song that Kate Smith sang for King George VI and Queen Elizabeth when they visited the White House in 1939.
