= The Edge of Love =

2008 film by John Maybury

- Theatrical release poster
- Directed by: John Maybury
- Written by: Sharman Macdonald
- Produced by: Rebekah Gilbertson; Sarah Radclyffe; Mritunjay Waghmare
- Starring: Keira Knightley; Sienna Miller; Cillian Murphy; Matthew Rhys
- Cinematography: Jonathan Freeman
- Edited by: Emma E. Hickox
- Music by: Angelo Badalamenti
- Production company: BBC Films
- Distributed by: Lionsgate; Capitol Films
- Release dates: 18 June 2008 (Edinburgh International Film Festival); 20 June 2008 (United Kingdom)
- Running time: 110 minutes
- Country: United Kingdom
- Language: English

The Edge of Love is a 2008 British biographical romantic drama film directed by John Maybury and starring Keira Knightley, Sienna Miller, Cillian Murphy, and Matthew Rhys. The script was written by Knightley's mother, Sharman Macdonald. Originally titled The Best Time of Our Lives, the fictional story concerns Welsh poet Dylan Thomas (played by Rhys), his wife Caitlin Macnamara (played by Miller) and their married friends, the Killicks (played by Knightley and Murphy). The film premiered at the Edinburgh International Film Festival on June 18, 2008, and was released in the UK theatres two days later to mostly unfavorable critical reviews.

The story is loosely based on real events and people, drawing on Rebekah Gilbertson's idea and David N. Thomas' 2000 book Dylan Thomas: A Farm, Two Mansions and a Bungalow. He has since written further about Dylan and Vera, highlighting the several deceits in the film that trivialised their friendship. He has described how Dylan and Vera were related as cousins, and the extent to which their families inter-married, farming together as neighbours on the Llansteffan peninsula in Carmarthenshire.

== Plot ==
During the London Blitz, nightclub singer Vera Phillips runs into her first love, charismatic Welsh poet Dylan Thomas. Although Dylan is now married to Caitlin Macnamara, with whom he has a son, he and Vera rekindle feelings for one another. The two women, initially rivals, become best friends. Drinking heavily in wartime London, the three come to get along.

William Killick, a British Army officer, begins to pursue Vera. Both Vera and Caitlin are intrigued by his steadfast, gallant personality despite its contrasts with Vera's rebelliousness. William notices Vera's closeness to Dylan, but doesn't appear concerned; he and Vera even lend the struggling poet some of their savings. William and Vera fall in love and marry. Soon afterward, William is called up to fight against the German invasion of Greece after the Italians failed.

Shortly after William's departure, Vera discovers she is pregnant. Upset that motherhood will take away her independence, she contemplates aborting the child but cannot bring herself to do so. She gives birth to a son and moves to the Welsh seashore with Dylan and Caitlin to raise their children in two small neighbouring cottages. Vera and Caitlin's friendship grows stronger while Dylan and Caitlin's marriage becomes distorted by multiple infidelities. Dylan draws Vera into an affair with him.

William returns a captain, scarred by the horrors of the war. Vera notices his emotional distance and instability. William suspects his wife of infidelity and confronts her. Vera confesses to both William and Caitlin, who are furious with her. One evening, while severely inebriated and angry with Dylan's friends for their ignorant remarks on the war, William wanders outside and fires multiple shots into Dylan and Caitlin's home. He does not hit anyone, and Vera calms him down. The next morning, William seems to have returned to his former self. However, he is arrested and taken to trial.

During the trial, Dylan testifies against William and distorts the facts, claiming that William was sober and intended to kill Dylan, Caitlin, and their child. The jury finds William innocent of intent to murder. After returning home, William accepts his new role as a father, and he and Vera forgive each other. Their relationship improves. Dylan and Caitlin move out of their cottage. During the farewell, Vera restores her friendship with Caitlin, but she never speaks to Dylan again, unable to forgive him for testifying against her husband.

== Cast ==
The cast included:

- Keira Knightley as Vera Phillips
- Sienna Miller as Caitlin Thomas
- Cillian Murphy as William Killick
- Matthew Rhys as Dylan Thomas
- Lisa Stansfield as Ruth Williams
- Graham McPherson as Al Bowlly
- Camilla Rutherford as Nicolette
- Alastair Mackenzie as Anthony Devas
- Richard Dillane as Lt Col David Talbot Rice
- Huw Ceredig as John Patrick
- Simon Armstrong as Wilfred Hosgood
- Rachel Essex as Mel
- Geoffrey Beevers as Registrar
- Ben Batt as Sergeant
- Paul Brooke as Mr. Justice Singleton
- Nick Stringer as PC Williams
- Anthony O'Donnell as Jack Lloyd
- Rachel Bell as Midwife
- Anne Lambton as Anita Shenkin
- Karl Johnson as Dai Fred
- Richard Clifford as Alastair Graham
- Rick Cord as ARP warden

== Distribution ==
The film made its world premiere opening at the Edinburgh Film Festival on 18 June 2008. It was released in London and Dublin two days later, with a Welsh premiere taking place in Swansea (the birthplace of Dylan Thomas) on the same night, attended by Matthew Rhys. A national release followed in the UK and Ireland on 27 June 2008. An exhibition of costumes, scripts and props from the film was on display at the Dylan Thomas Centre in Swansea until September 2008. The Edge of Love has earned US$3,238,922 in gross revenue since its June 2008 release.

== Critical reception ==
The Edge of Love received mostly unfavorable reviews from critics. On Rotten Tomatoes, the film received a 39% rating based on 57 reviews, with an average rating of 5.10/10. The site's consensus reads: "Despite effective performances from Knightley and Miller, The Edge of Love lacks a coherent narrative". Metacritic, which uses a weighted average score, gave the film 39 out of 100 based on reviews from 13 critics, indicating "generally unfavorable reviews".

In Variety, Leslie Felperin commented: "While the period drama has several redeeming features, tonally it's all over the map, veering between artsy stylization and hum-drum, sometimes almost twee melodrama." Mark Kermode described the film as "inert" and said that the script was "flawed but not without some form of admirable merit".

The Independent felt that "Maybury's stylisation makes the film more interesting than it would have been if directed by your average British journeyman, but it finally adds up to earnest heritage romance." In The Guardian, reviewer Philip French said, "This is a fascinating story, its chronology somewhat muddled and its dramatic thrust rather obscure."

The Hollywood Reporter critic Ray Bennett commented that The Edge of Love is a "wonderfully atmospheric tale of love and war" and stated about Knightley and Miller; "the film belongs to the women, with Knightley going from strength to strength (and showing she can sing!) and Miller again proving that she has everything it takes to be a major movie star."

Sienna Miller received a nomination as Best Supporting Actress at the 2008 British Independent Film Awards.

== Soundtrack ==
The Edge of Love (Music from the Motion Picture)

Soundtrack album by Angelo Badalamenti
- Released: 24 June 2008
- Genre: Soundtrack

Professional ratings
Review scores
Source	Rating
AllMusic	3.5/5 stars
Discogs	5 / 5

The Edge of Love soundtrack by Angelo Badalamenti includes songs by Keira Knightley, Siouxsie Sioux, Suggs, Patrick Wolf, and Beth Rowley. Siouxsie performs the second version of "Careless Love", while Wolf performs "Careless Talk".

The composer performed the soundtrack live with Siouxsie and Beth Rowley at the World Soundtrack Awards in Ghent in October 2008.

Track listing

1. "Lovers Lie Abed"
2. "Overture/Blue Tahitian Moon"
3. "Underground Shelter"
4. "Hang Out the Stars in Indiana"
5. "After the Bombing/Hang Out the Stars in Indiana"
6. "A Stranger Has Come"
7. "Fire to the Stars"
8. "Careless Talk" (vocals by Beth Rowley)
9. "Careless Love"
10. "Love Me"
11. "Careless Talk"
12. "Drifting and Dreaming"
13. "Home Movies"
14. "Under Fire"
15. "Maybe It's Because I Love You Too Much"
16. "Vera Begs Dylan"
17. "Vera's Theme"
18. "Holding Rowatt"
19. "Careless Love" (vocals by Siouxsie Sioux)
20. "Caitlin's Theme"
