= James F. Hanley =

American songwriter (1892–1942)

- Born: February 17, 1892; Rensselaer, Indiana
- Died: February 8, 1942 (aged 49); Douglaston, Queens
- Education: Champion College and Chicago Musical College
- Occupation: Musician

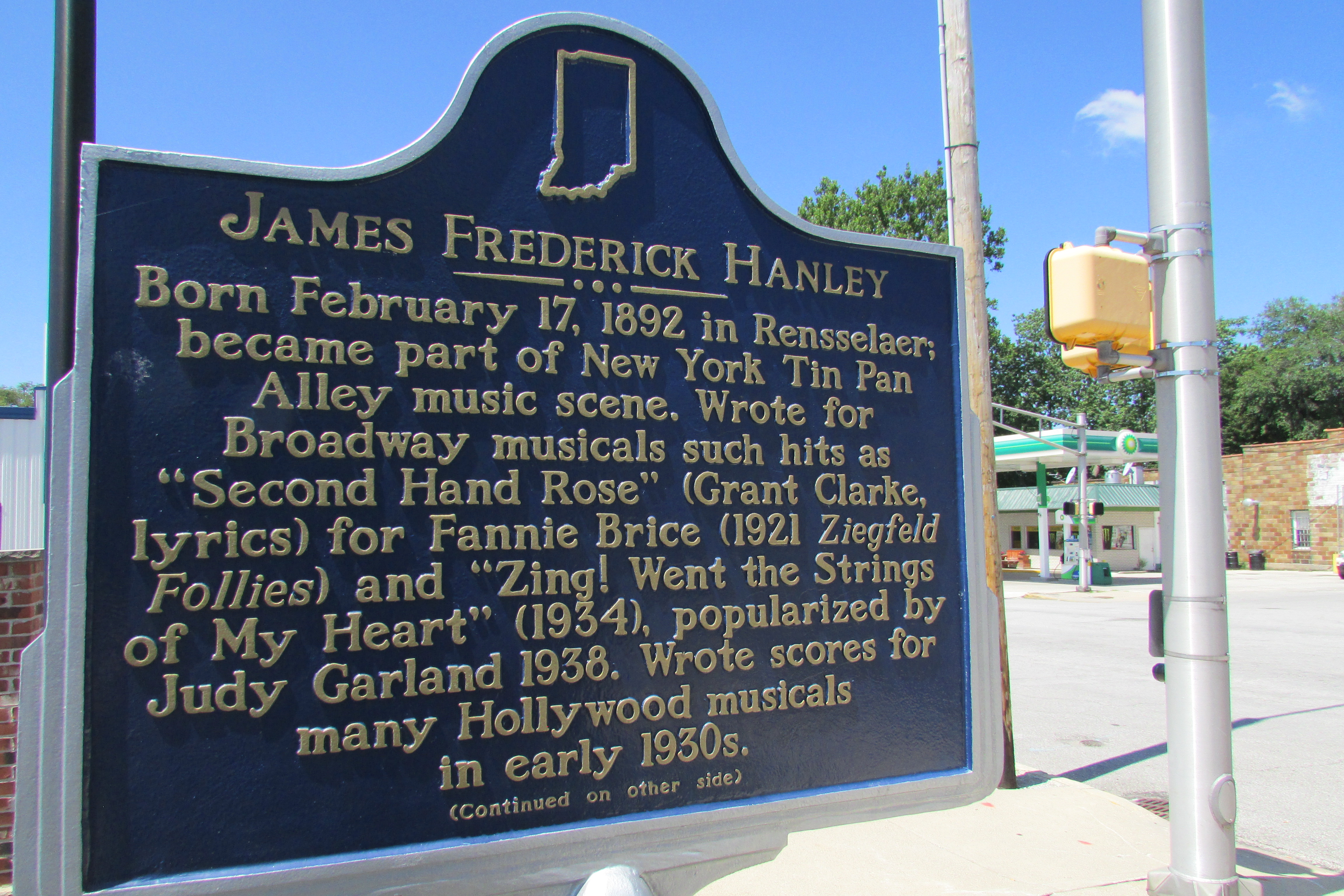
James Frederick Hanley Hist. Marker in Rensselaer, Indiana

James Frederick Hanley (February 17, 1892 – February 8, 1942) was an American songwriter and author.

== Biography ==
Hanley was born in Rensselaer, Indiana, in the United States. He attended Champion College and the Chicago Musical College.

He served with the United States Army 82nd Division in World War I and during his military service he wrote an army musical show called Toot Sweet.

On his discharge Hanley became a vaudeville accompanist. He went on to write songs for film and theater including many Broadway productions. He worked with numerous artists, most notably Buddy DeSylva, Edward Madden, Eddie Dowling, Percy Wenrich, Theodore F. Morse and Ballard MacDonald.

Hanley is best remembered for the hit songs "(Back Home Again in) Indiana" (1917), "Second Hand Rose" (1921) and "Zing! Went the Strings of My Heart" (1934). For the latter song, Hanley contributed to both music and lyrics, while for most of his songs he usually wrote only the music.

He died of a heart attack at his home in Douglaston, Queens, on February 8, 1942, leaving a widow and five children. Hanley was inducted into the Songwriters Hall of Fame in 1970.

== Musical theatre credits ==
- Toot Sweet

=== Broadway ===
- Robinson Crusoe, Jr. (1916), co-composer with Sigmund Romberg
- Ziegfeld Follies of 1917 (1917), featured songwriter
- The Greenwich Village Follies of 1920 (1920), featured songwriter
- Jim Jam Jems (1920), composer, lyrics by Harry Cort and George Stoddard
- Ziegfeld Follies of 1921 (1921), featured songwriter
- Pins and Needles of 1922 (1922), co-composer with Frederick Chappelle, lyrics by Ballard MacDonald and Irving Caesar
- Spice of 1922 (1922), co-composer with J. Fred Coots and Henry Creamer, lyrics by James Stanley and McElbert Moore
- Big Boy (1925), co-composer with Joseph Meyer, lyrics by Buddy DeSylva
- No Foolin' (1926), featured songwriter, lyrics by Gene Buck
- Honeymoon Lane (1926), composer, lyrics by Eddie Dowling
- Sidewalks of New York (1927), co-composer, co-author with Eddie Dowling
- Keep It Clean (1929), co-composer
- Ziegfeld Follies of 1934 (1934), featured songwriter
- Thumbs Up! (1934), co-composer with Henry Sullivan

Also contributed songs to:

- Ziegfeld Follies of 1922 (1922)
- George White's Scandals of 1923 (1923)
- Innocent Eyes (1924)
- Gay Paree of 1925 (1925)
- High Queen (1926)
- Take the Air (1927)

== Selected songs ==
- "A Cabaret 'Neath the Old Egyptian Moon"
- "(Back Home Again in) Indiana"
- "Breeze (Blow My Baby Back to Me)"
- "Dig a Little Deeper"
- "Dreaming of Home Sweet Home" – 1918. L: Ballard MacDonald
- "Dreams for Sale"
- "Gee, but I Hate to Go Home Alone"
- "Good-Bye, My Little Lady" – 1917. L: Joe Goodwin
- "Half a Moon"
- "I'm a Lonesome Little Raindrop (Looking for a Place to Fall)" – 1920
- "I Wonder What He's Doing To-Night" – 1917. L: Joe Goodwin
- "I've Got a Ten Day Pass for a Honeymoon (With the Girl I Left Behind)" – 1918. L: Walter Donaldson and Ballard MacDonald
- "Jersey Walk"
- "Just a Cottage Small by a Waterfall"
- "Last Long Flight" – 1920
- "Little Bit of Sunshine (From Home)" – 1918. L: Ballard MacDonald and Joe Goodwin
- "Little Log Cabin of Dreams"
- "The Little White House (At the End of Honeymoon Lane)"
- "Mary Dear"
- "No Foolin'"
- "Never Forget to Write Home" – 1917. L: Ballard MacDonald
- "Ragtime Volunteers Are Off to War" – 1917. L: Ballard MacDonald
- "Rose of Washington Square"
- "Second Hand Rose" – 1921, made popular by Fanny Brice and later associated with Barbra Streisand
- "Sleepy Valley"
- "Three Wonderful Letters from Home" – 1918. L: Ballard MacDonald and Joe Goodwin
- "War Babies" – 1916. L: Ballard MacDonald and Edward Madden
- "We'll Be There, on the Land, on the Sea, in the Air" – 1917. L: Ballard MacDonald
- "Wherever You Are"
- "Zing! Went the Strings of My Heart" – 1934, made popular by Judy Garland; reprised throughout her career.

== Selected filmography ==
- So This Is London (1930)
- Under Suspicion (1930)
