= Ray Dooley (actress) =

Scottish actor, comedian and vaudeville

- Dooley c. 1919
- Born: Rachel Rice Dool; Glasgow, Scotland
- Died: January 28, 1984; East Hampton, New York
- Known for: Vaudeville
- Spouse: Eddie Dowling
- Children: 2

Ray Dooley (née Rachel Rice Dool; died January 28, 1984) was a vaudeville performer in the Ziegfeld Follies with others including W. C. Fields, Will Rogers and Fanny Brice. From there she moved to other musical stage performances.

== Biography ==
Ray Dooley was born in Glasgow, Scotland as Rachel Rice Dool to Robert Rogers Dooley, an Irish-born circus clown. (The family name was later changed to Dooley.) Her brothers, Gordon, Johnny, and Willie Dooley, were also performers.

She made her performing debut in a minstrel show in Philadelphia She played "babies and brats" in the Ziegfeld Follies after World War I with W. C. Fields, Will Rogers, and Fanny Brice, among others. From there she moved to musical stage performances.

She eloped with Eddie Dowling; the couple had two children, a son, Jack, and a daughter, Mary Maxine (later Mrs. Clark).

From 1919–34, Dooley teamed with Dowling for Ziegfeld Follies and in Thumbs Up in 1934, after which she retired. She came out of retirement in 1948 to appear in Hope's the Thing and Home Life of a Buffalo.

Dooley died on January 28, 1984, at her home in East Hampton, New York. She was buried alongside her husband in St. Joseph's Cemetery, Cumberland, Providence County, Rhode Island.
