= Monte Cristo Jr. (musical) =

1919 musical

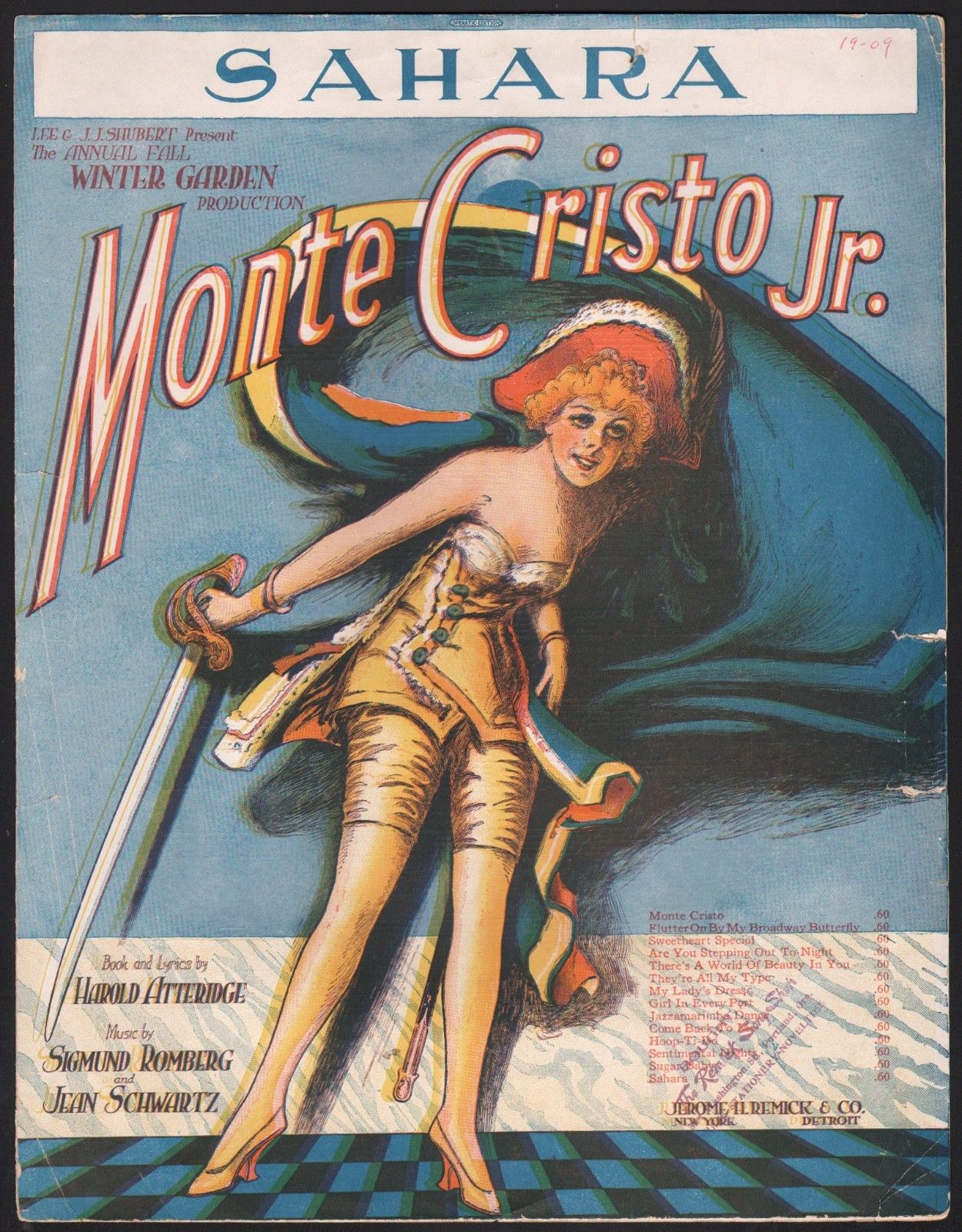
Sheet music cover for Monte Cristo, Jr. (1919)

Monte Cristo Jr. is a musical in two acts with music by Sigmund Romberg and Jean Schwartz and both book and lyrics by Harold Atteridge. Additional music was by Maurice Abrahams, Fred E. Alhert and Earl Carroll, with lyrics by Earl Carroll, Sam M. Lewis and Joe Young. It should not be confused with the similarly named Monte Cristo Jr. by Richard Henry.

Romberg, Schwartz, & Atteridge's Monte Cristo, Jr. premiered on Broadway at the Winter Garden Theatre on February 12, 1919; closing on October 4, 1919, after 215 performances. Performances of this show were suspended for a month during the Actor's Equity strike. It starred Charles Purcell as a boy named Monte who is reading Dumas's The Count of Monte Cristo, and after falling asleep, finds himself and his friends transformed into characters within the book. Others in the original cast included Charles "Chic" Sale (as Jefferson Sap Jr.), Flore Revalles (as Yvonne, Haydee, and Diamonda), Rosa Rolanda (as King Love), Sam Ash (as Julian Danglers), Gordon Dooley (as Wilbur), Esther Walker (as Daisy), and Ralph C. Herz (as Jameson and Reverend Fluffy Ruff) among others.
