= Daddy Mine =

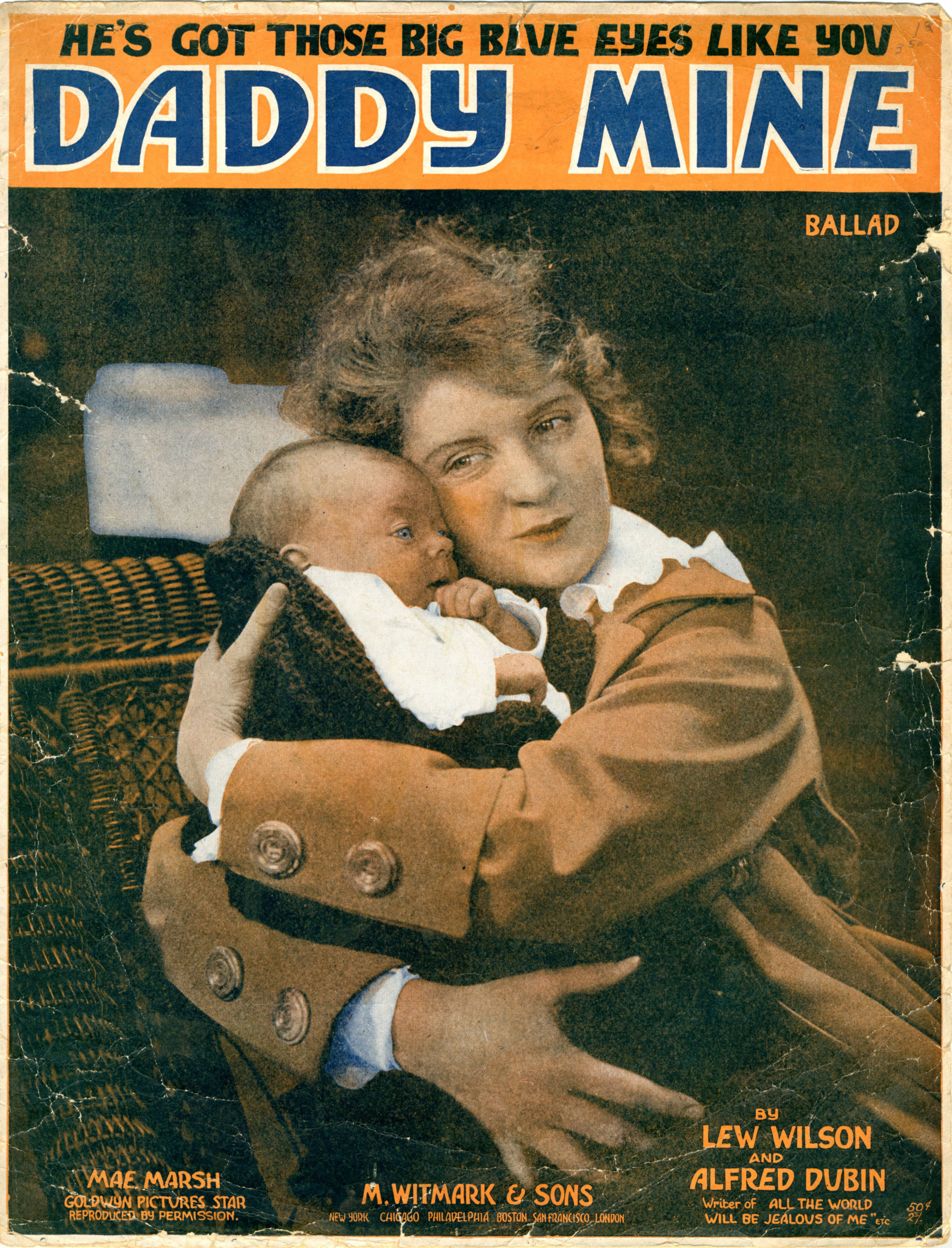

Song
- Released: 1918
- Genre: World War I song
- Composer: Al Dubin
- Lyricist: Lew Wilson

"Daddy Mine" is a World War I song released in 1918. Lew Wilson wrote and Alfred Dubin composed this ballad. It was published by M. Witmark & Songs in New York, New York. It was written for both voice and piano.

The cover features a photo of Mae Marsh, a Goldwyn Pictures Star, holding an infant. This song, performed by Charles Hart, and Elizabeth Spencer, was included in a 1918 sound disc recording entitled "Three Wonderful Letters from Home."

The sheet music can be found at the Pritzker Military Museum and Library, and the Joseph M. Bruccoli Great War Collection at the University of South Carolina.
