= That's Why Darkies Were Born =

1931 song written by Ray Henderson and Lew Brown

Song by various artists
- Released: 1931
- Recorded: 1931
- Songwriters: Ray Henderson and Lew Brown
- Notably recorded by Paul Robeson and Kate Smith

"That's Why Darkies Were Born" was a song written by Ray Henderson and Lew Brown. It originated in George White's Scandals of 1931, where white baritone Everett Marshall performed the song in blackface.

The song was popularized by singer Kate Smith, whose rendition was a hit in 1931, and by singer and civil rights activist Paul Robeson. It was also featured in a 1931 all-star recording of a medley of songs from George White's Scandals.

One verse runs:

Someone had to pick the cotton,
Someone had to plant the corn,
Someone had to slave and be able to sing,
That's why darkies were born.

The song was part of a fatalistic musical genre in the 1930s where African-Americans were depicted as "fated to work the land, fated to be where they are, to never change". "That's Why Darkies Were Born" has been described as presenting a satirical view of racism, although others have said there is no evidence that the song was ever performed in a satirical or joking manner. The song was criticized as racist by African-American audiences in the early 1930s, and Mildred Bailey received many letters from the public urging her to stop performing it in 1931.

== In popular culture ==
The song is referenced in the Marx Brothers film Duck Soup, when Groucho Marx's character Rufus T. Firefly says, "My father was a little headstrong, my mother was a little armstrong. The Headstrongs married the Armstrongs, and that's why darkies were born". Part of Marx's line, primarily the term "darkies", was removed from television prints of this film in the early 1970s. The full dialogue was restored in 1980 for home video releases and future broadcast syndication.

It is also referenced in the movie Satan Met a Lady.

On April 18, 2019, the baseball team New York Yankees announced that Kate Smith's rendition of "God Bless America" would no longer be played at Yankee Stadium, citing "That's Why Darkies Were Born" along with another controversial song sung by Smith, "Pickaninny Heaven". The Philadelphia Flyers followed suit the next day, covering up a statue of Smith that stood outside the Wells Fargo Center, then removing the statue on April 21, 2019.
