= Honeymoon Lane (musical) =

Honeymoon Lane was a popular Broadway musical by Eddie Dowling, who wrote the book and also starred with music by James F. Hanley. The musical was a big success and ran for nearly a year from 20 September 1926 at the Knickerbocker Theatre on Broadway. Among the cast was Pauline Mason as Mary Brown, Eddie Dowling as Tim Murphy, Al Sexton as Ted Kleinze, and Kate Smith. The play was made into a film of the same name with Dowling again starring in 1931.

== Plot ==
The musical begins in the fictional town of Canningville, Pennsylvania at the W.H. Kleinze Pickle Factory where two Irish immigrants, Tim Murphy and Mary Brown, are gainfully employed. The two fall in love and marry; buying a home on Honeymoon Lane. The millionaire owner of the pickle factory, Ted Kleinze, intervenes in the couple's lives as he believes Mary has the potential to be a Broadway star. He takes Mary away from Tim to New York City where she obtains work as a chorus girl, but finds life in Manhattan troublesome as the city is both dirty and full of lecherous fans who give her trouble. Tim arrives in New York City, rescues Mary from her troubles, and the two return happily to their home on Honeymoon Lane in Pennsylvania.

== Songs ==
- “The Little White House (at the End of Honeymoon Lane)” was one of the biggest songs of 1927.
