= Eddie Dowling =

American actor and composer (1889–1976)

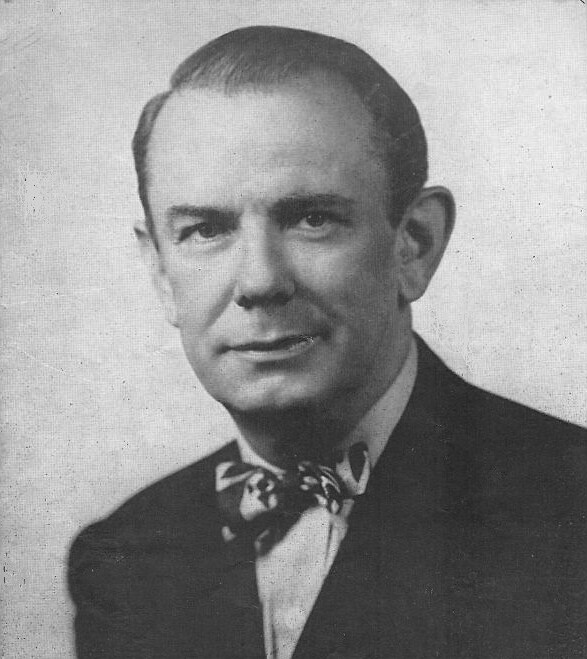
- Dowling in 1950
- Born: Joseph Nelson Goucher; December 11, 1889; Woonsocket, Rhode Island, U.S.
- Died: February 18, 1976 (aged 86); Smithfield, Rhode Island, U.S.
- Occupations: Actor; director; playwright; screenwriter; composer; theatrical producer
- Years active: 1919–1956
- Spouse: Rachel Rice Dooley (m. 1911)
- Children: 2

Eddie Dowling (born Joseph Nelson Goucher; December 11, 1889 – February 18, 1976) was an American actor, director, playwright, screenwriter, composer and theatrical producer.

== Early years ==
Born Joseph Nelson Goucher on December 11, 1889, he was the 14th of 17 children born to a father of French-Canadian descent and a mother of Irish descent in Woonsocket, Rhode Island. (Some sources give his middle name as Narcisse.) He took his professional surname from the maiden name of his mother, Bridget Mary Dowling, who was born in Smithfield, Rhode Island. His father was Charles Goucher, a textile worker, who was born in St Marcel, Province of Québec, Canada.

== Stage ==
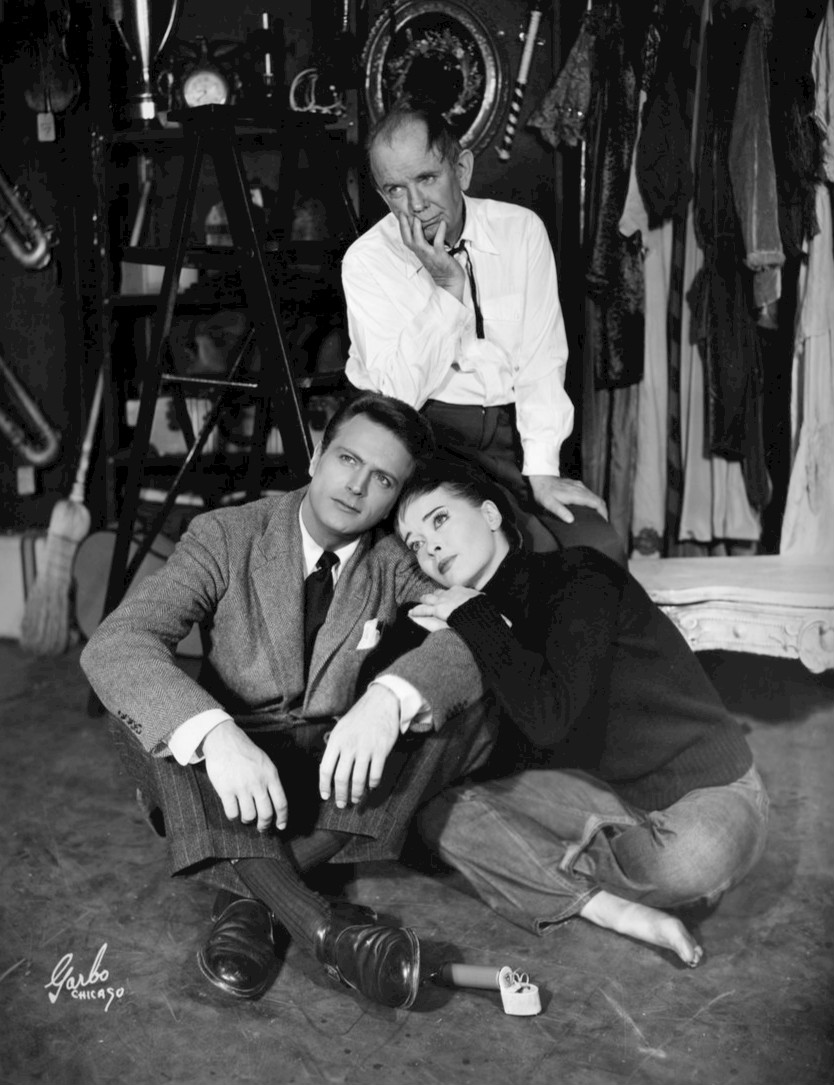
Clockwise from top: Eddie Dowling, Joan McCracken, and Jason Evers in the Broadway play Angel in the Pawnshop (1951)

Dowling began his career in vaudeville with the Homan Stock Company at the Scenic Temple theatre in Providence, RI. He appeared on stage for many years, including appearances in the Ziegfeld Follies. His Broadway debut came in The Velvet Lady (1919). His most famous role was as Tom Wingfield in the original Broadway production of The Glass Menagerie, starring opposite Laurette Taylor and Julie Haydon. He produced the play's original Chicago production in 1944 and followed it to Broadway.

== Politics ==
Dowling sought the 1934 Democratic nomination for the United States Senate seat from Rhode Island. At the time, Time reported that his great-grandfather and two great-grand uncles were the founders of Goucher College for Women in Baltimore and that "he was the 14th in a family of 17 children; his schooling had extended only up to the third grade; he had been a cabin boy and a music hall singer...and he owned a sausage factory in California."

== Personal life ==
Dowling was married to the Scottish-born actress and stage performer Ray Dooley, who specialized in physical comedy; they had two children, Jack and Maxine. Jack Dowling was killed in a plane crash in Brazil in 1955 when he was Time magazine's Buenos Aires bureau chief.

On February 18, 1976, Dowling died at a nursing home in Smithfield, Rhode Island at the age of 86. His widow died in 1984, aged 95, in East Hampton, Long Island, New York.
