= Dania Hall (Minneapolis) =

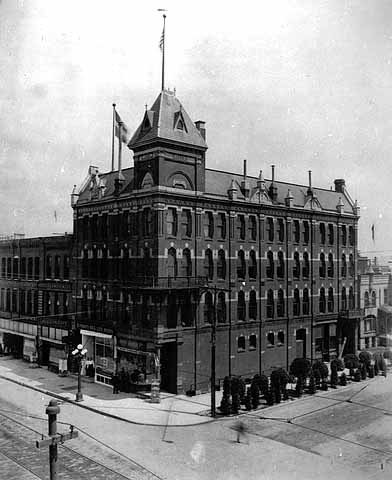
- Interactive map of the Dania Hall area

General information
- Type: community center
- Architectural style: Victorian eclectic
- Location: 427 Cedar Avenue South; Minneapolis, Minnesota
- Coordinates: 44°58′08″N 93°14′49″W
- Completed: 1886
- Demolished: 2000
- Owner: Society Dania

Design and construction
- Architect: Carl F. Struck

Dania Hall was a cultural center and performing arts space in the Cedar-Riverside neighborhood of Minneapolis. Completed in 1886, the building was destroyed by an accidental fire in 2000 at the outset of an extensive renovation project.

== Early history ==
The five-story building, located at 427 Cedar Avenue South, was designed by the Norwegian-born architect Carl F. Struck for Society Dania, an organization founded by Danish immigrants. The large auditorium making up the third and fourth floors included a proscenium stage and horseshoe balcony. Its main floor could accommodate up to six hundred chairs or be cleared for dancing. There were offices and a small meeting room on the second floor while the ground level and basement were for commercial retail use. A multi-purpose facility, Dania Hall served as a gathering place for Danes, Swedes, Norwegians, and the larger community. It hosted banquets, bazaars, concerts, dances, plays and evenings of Scandinavian vaudeville.

The Norwegian author Knut Hamsun, who lived in Minneapolis during the 1880s, gave a series of literary lectures at the newly built Dania Hall. His farewell address there in 1888 included material that would later appear in the book: Fra det moderne Amerikas aandsliv (The Cultural Life of Modern America).

In the 1920s and 1930s many Scandinavian-American artists performed at Dania Hall. Among them were the Olson Sisters, Olle i Skratthult, Ted Johnson and his Midnight Suns and Thorstein Skarning and his Norwegian Hillbillies. The Snoose Boulevard Festival, which ran from 1972 through 1977, brought back the music and humor of that period with performances at the Cedar Theater, Coffeehouse Extemporé, New Riverside Café and Mixed Blood Theatre. Dania Hall, the chief symbol of the area's Scandinavian past, flew a banner from Sweden from its tower during the event but was not used as a venue due to the poor condition of the building.

== Later years ==
By the 1960s the Cedar-Riverside neighborhood had undergone significant change and was no longer at the center of Scandinavian-American activities. In 1963 Society Dania sold Dania Hall to Phil Richter, whose pharmacy had occupied the building's first floor since 1948. Even as Dania's meeting hall was abandoned by the Scandinavian-American community it attracted large numbers of young people, who went there in the 1960s and 1970s to hear T.C. Atlantic, the Paisleys and other rock bands as well as the reggae music of Shangoya. In later years the auditorium was no longer in use, having been denied a permit for public gatherings without additional exits and other improvements.

== Destruction and aftermath ==
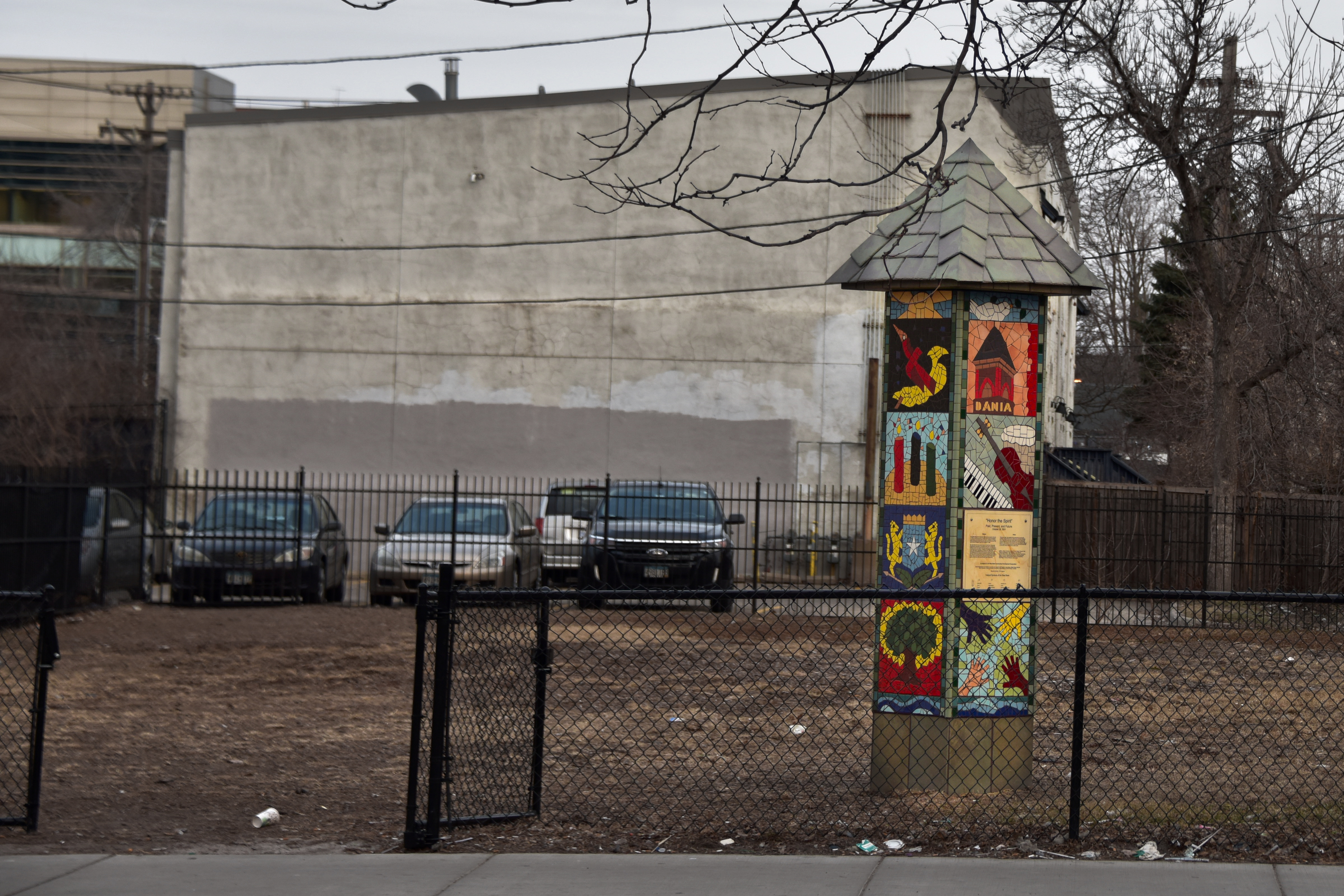
The former site of Dania Hall in 2017

In 1991 a fire severely damaged Dania Hall's roof and upper floors. The roof was replaced, and by decade's end a full-scale restoration of the building had begun. In the early morning hours of February 28, 2000 a fire broke out, engulfing the building and leaving a charred ruin. The arson squad ruled that the fire was unintentional, the result of a discarded cigarette. Nonetheless, questions about the blaze and the building's lack of insurance have engendered controversy.

A memorial gathering, attended by several hundred people, took place March 2, 2000, at the Cedar Cultural Center. During the meeting, individuals reminisced about Dania Hall and shared their thoughts about the century-old landmark. The audience also listened to recordings of two Swedish songs: Hälsa dem därhemma (Greet those at home) and Barndomshemmet (My childhood home). The singer, Olga Lindgren-Nilsen, had recorded the sentimental ballads in 1975 at the age of seventy-nine. The first wife of Olle i Skratthult, she appeared many times on the Dania Hall stage.

In October 2001 a commemorative pillar was erected at the former site of Dania Hall. The historic address, so important to the Scandinavian-American community and the Cedar-Riverside neighborhood, has subsequently remained a vacant lot awaiting development. Dania Hall's architect still has a presence in the area. A two-story building, designed by Carl F. Struck in 1890, remains in use at 521 Cedar Avenue South.

== National Register of Historic Places ==
Dania Hall was added to the National Register of Historic Places in 1974 and removed from the list after its destruction in 2000. Two other buildings designed by Carl F. Struck are in the National Register of Historic Places: the Bardwell–Ferrant House at 2500 Portland Avenue South and the Pracna Building in the St. Anthony Falls Historic District. The main building of the Grain Belt Brewery in Northeast Minneapolis is also in the National Register of Historic Places. Although Struck did not contribute to its design, he was the architect for an office building at 1215 Marshall Street NE that was part of the complex.

== See also ==
- The Snoose Boulevard Festival
- Dania Hall (Racine, Wisconsin)
- Notable buildings of the Danish Brotherhood in America
