= Dania Hall =

Dania Hall may refer to:

- Dania Hall (Minneapolis), a cultural center and performing arts space
- Dania Hall (Racine, Wisconsin), a historic gathering place
