= Hobe =

Hobe may refer to:

== People ==
- Hobe (family), a German aristocratic family also influential in Denmark
- Jobé, a subgroup of the Jaega Native American tribe of Florida
- Hobe Ferris (1877–1938), American Major League Baseball player
- Hobe Morrison, named an honorary life member of the Directors Guild of America - see 14th Directors Guild of America Awards
- Engelbrecht H. Hobe, builder of the E. H. Hobe House-Solheim, a house on the United States National Register of Historic Places

== Other uses ==
- Hobe, an alternate name for Tamsui District, Taiwan, and the surrounding area
  - Battle of Tamsui or Hobe, an 1884 victory of the Qing dynasty over the French
