= Carl F. Struck =

American architect

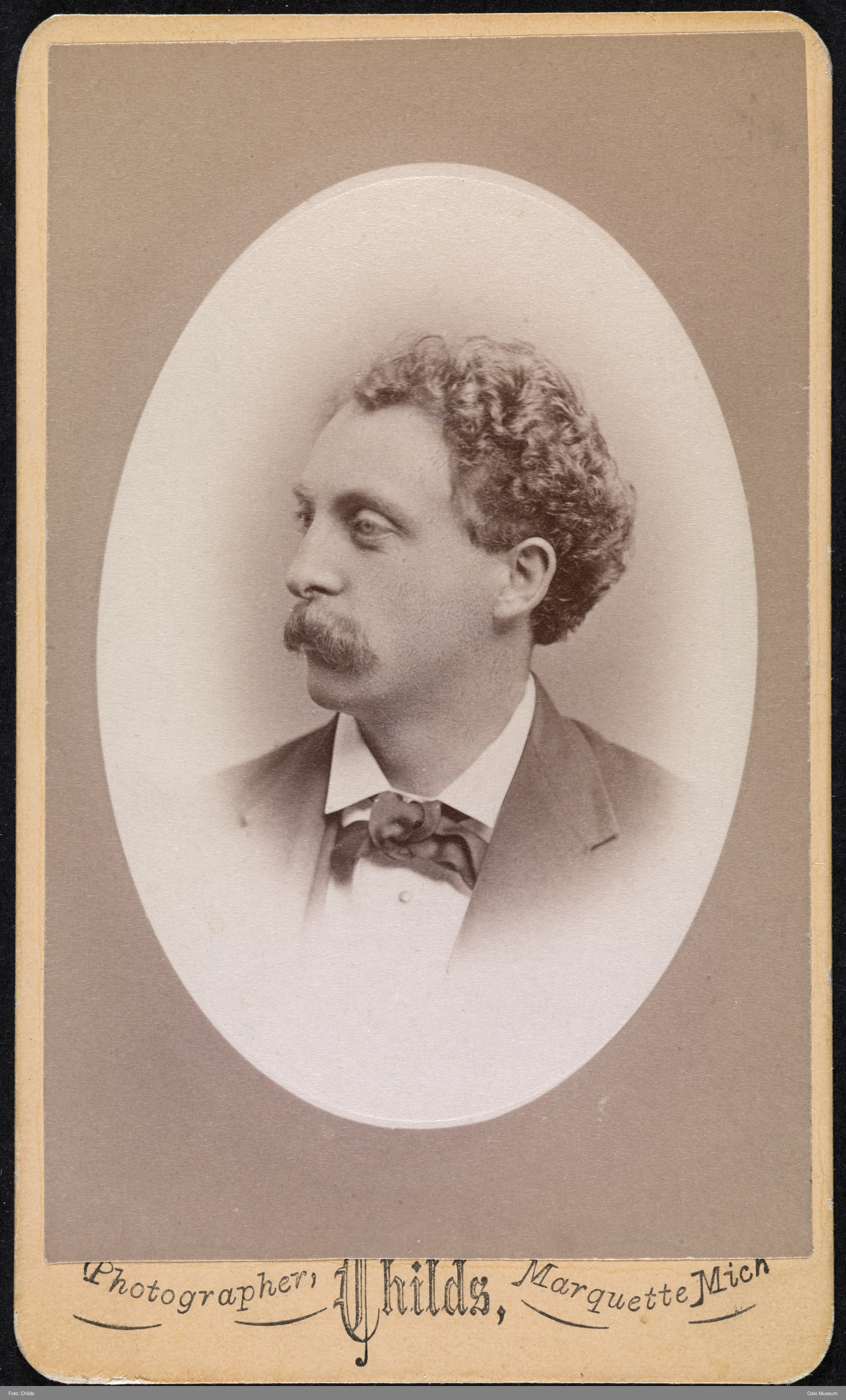
- Struck c. 1870
- Born: 29 January 1842; Christiania, Norway
- Died: 3 March 1912 (aged 70); Spokane, Washington, U.S.
- Occupation: architect
- Spouse: Vasillia Thrane

Carl F. Struck (29 January 1842 – 3 March 1912) was a Norwegian American architect, who designed private residences, civic buildings and commercial structures throughout the Midwest in the latter part of the 19th century.

== Biography ==
Carl F. Struck was born in Christiania (now Oslo) on 29 January and christened in Oslo domkirke (Cathedral) on 27 April. His parents were Hans Henrik Struck (born in Eutin, Ostholstein) and Rønnaug Marie Jonasdr Elg (born in Faaberg, Oppland). He immigrated to the United States in 1865. After employment at architectural offices in Brooklyn, Cleveland, Chicago and Marquette, Michigan, he arrived in Minneapolis in 1881, where he worked for the next twenty years. Among his most important commissions were designs for Scandinavian fraternal buildings and churches.

The son of a German father and Norwegian mother (of Swedish descent), Struck was married to Vasillia Thrane (1852-1920), whose father, Marcus Thrane, was one of the founding fathers of the Norwegian labor movement.

== National Register of Historic Places ==
Two Minneapolis buildings designed by Carl F. Struck are in the National Register of Historic Places: the Bardwell–Ferrant House at 2500 Portland Avenue South and the Pracna Building in the St. Anthony Falls Historic District. Another was Minneapolis's Dania Hall, was added to the National Register of Historic Places in 1974 and removed from the list after its destruction by fire in 2000.

The main building of the Grain Belt Brewery in Northeast Minneapolis is also in the National Register of Historic Places. Although Struck did not contribute to its design, he was the architect for an office building at 1215 Marshall Street NE that was part of the complex.

== Selected buildings ==
Minneapolis

- 1884 Chicago House
- 1884 Harmonia Hall
- 1886 Dania Hall
- 1889 Normanna Hall
- 1890 521 Cedar Avenue South
- 1890 Pracna Building
- 1893 Grain Belt Office Building

Other locations

- 1880 Vernon County Courthouse in Viroqua, Wisconsin
- 1890 Boesch, Hummel, and Maltzahn Block in New Ulm, Minnesota
- 1891 Brown County Courthouse in New Ulm, Minnesota

== Gallery ==
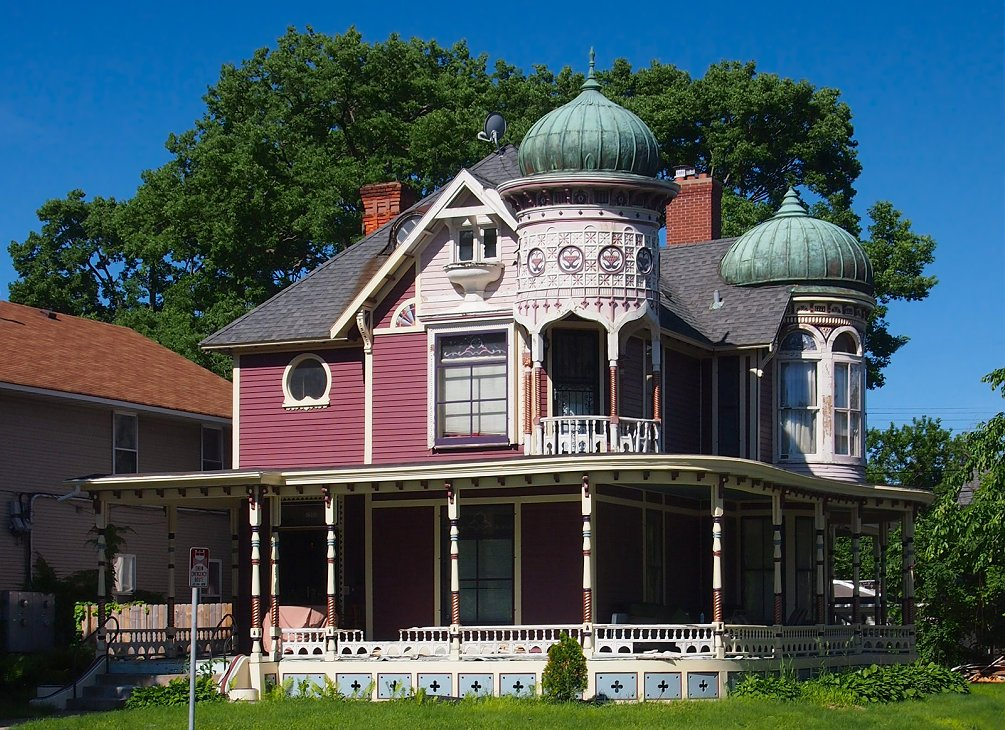
Bardwell–Ferrant House in Minneapolis

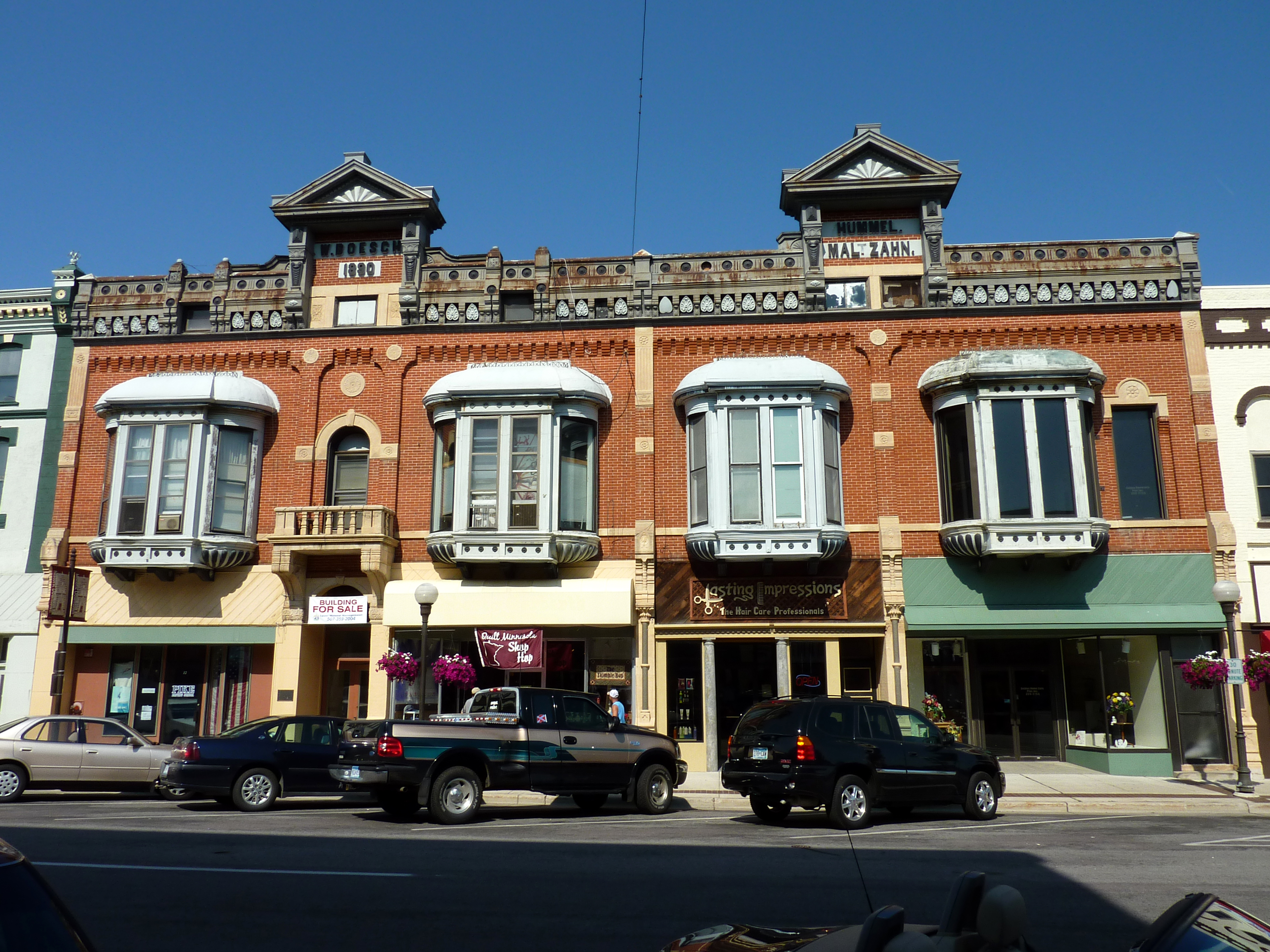
Boesch, Hummel, and Maltzahn Block in New Ulm, Minnesota

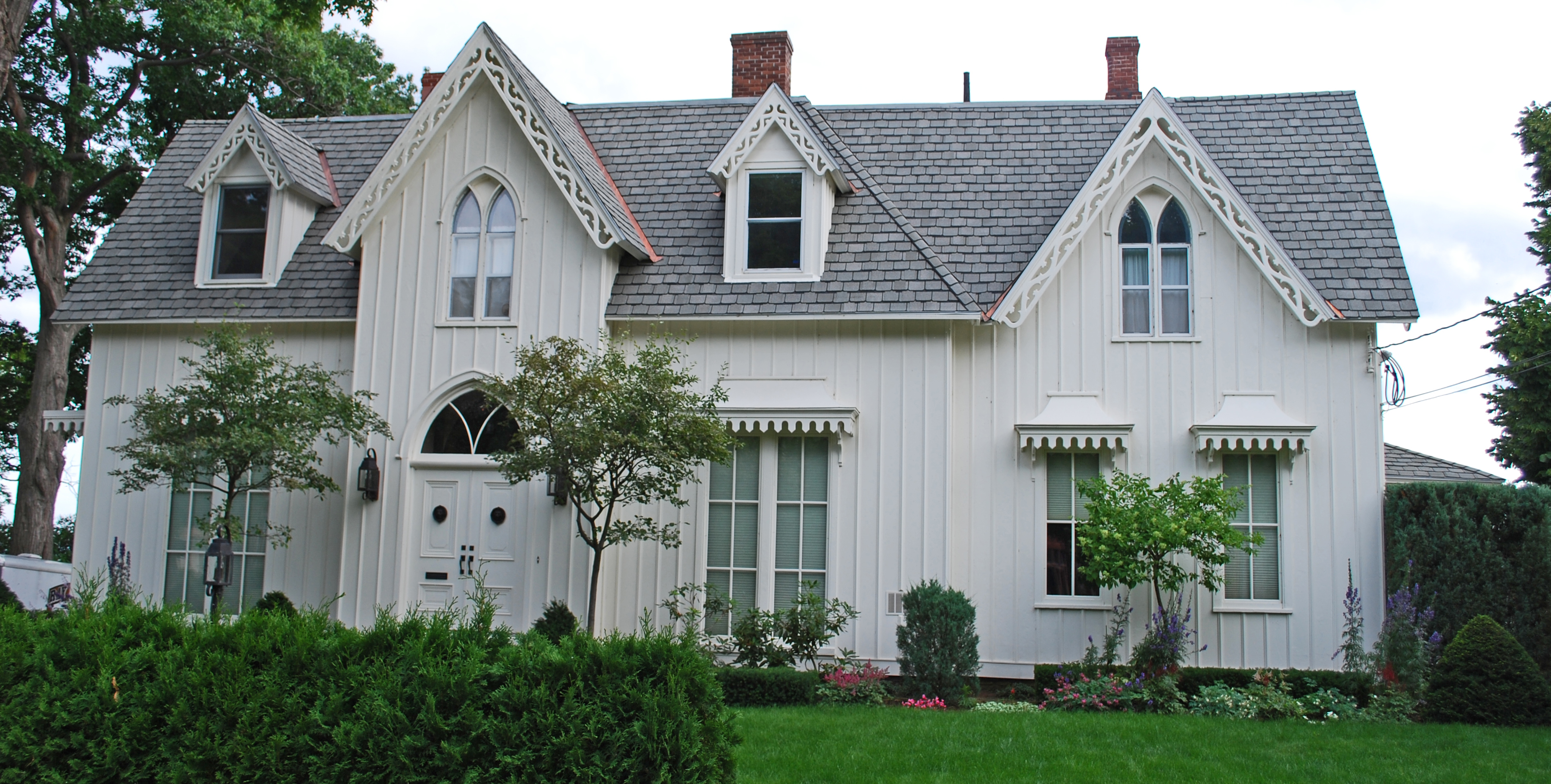
Call House in Marquette, Michigan

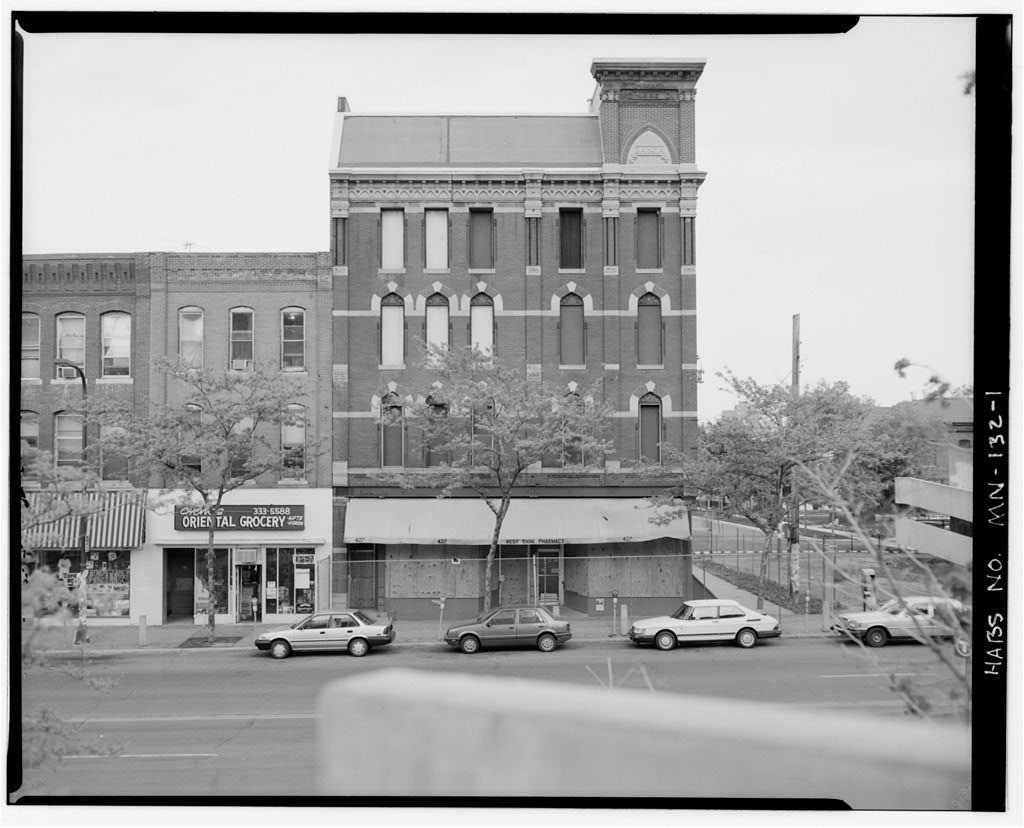
Dania Hall in Minneapolis

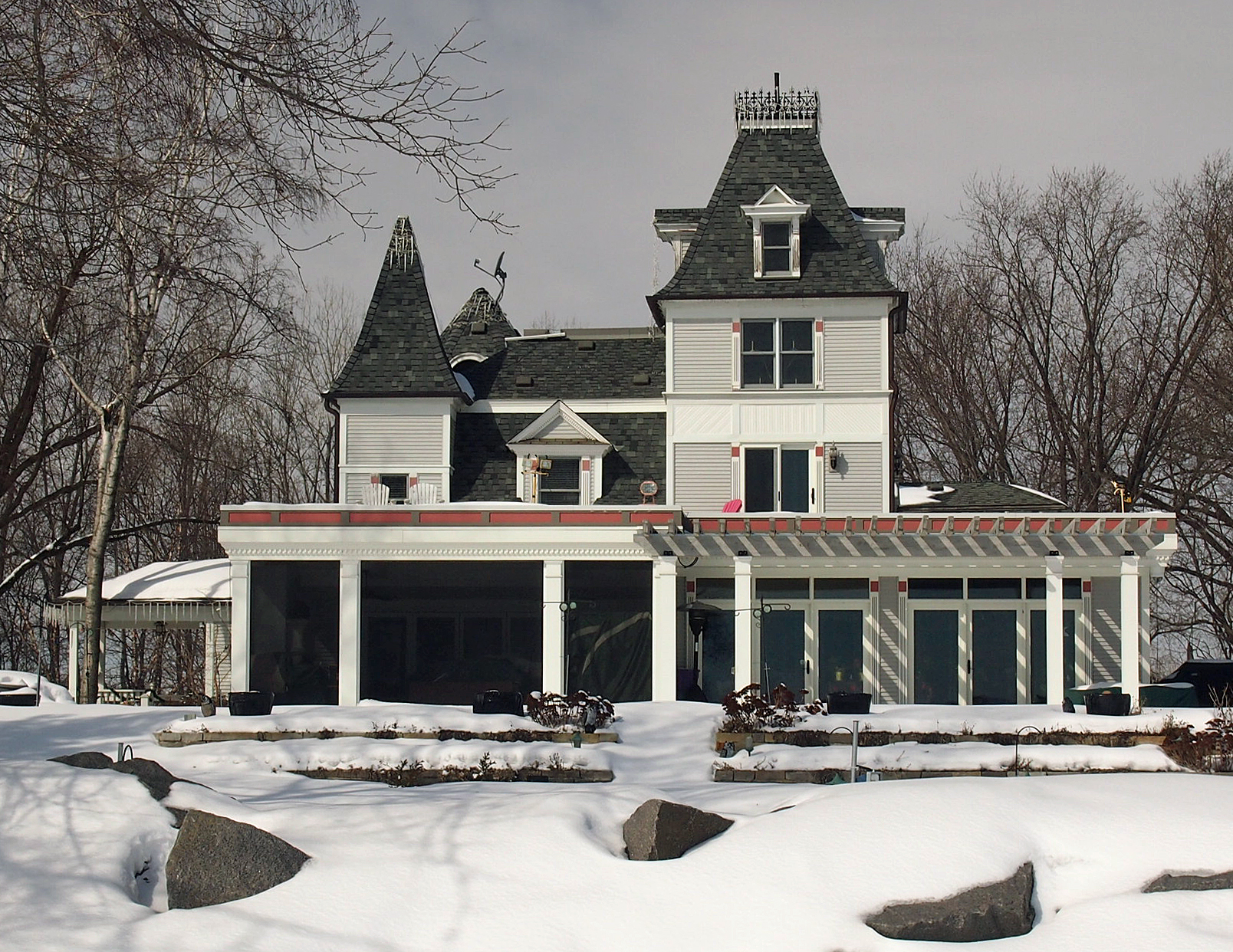
E. H. Hobe House in White Bear Lake, Minnesota

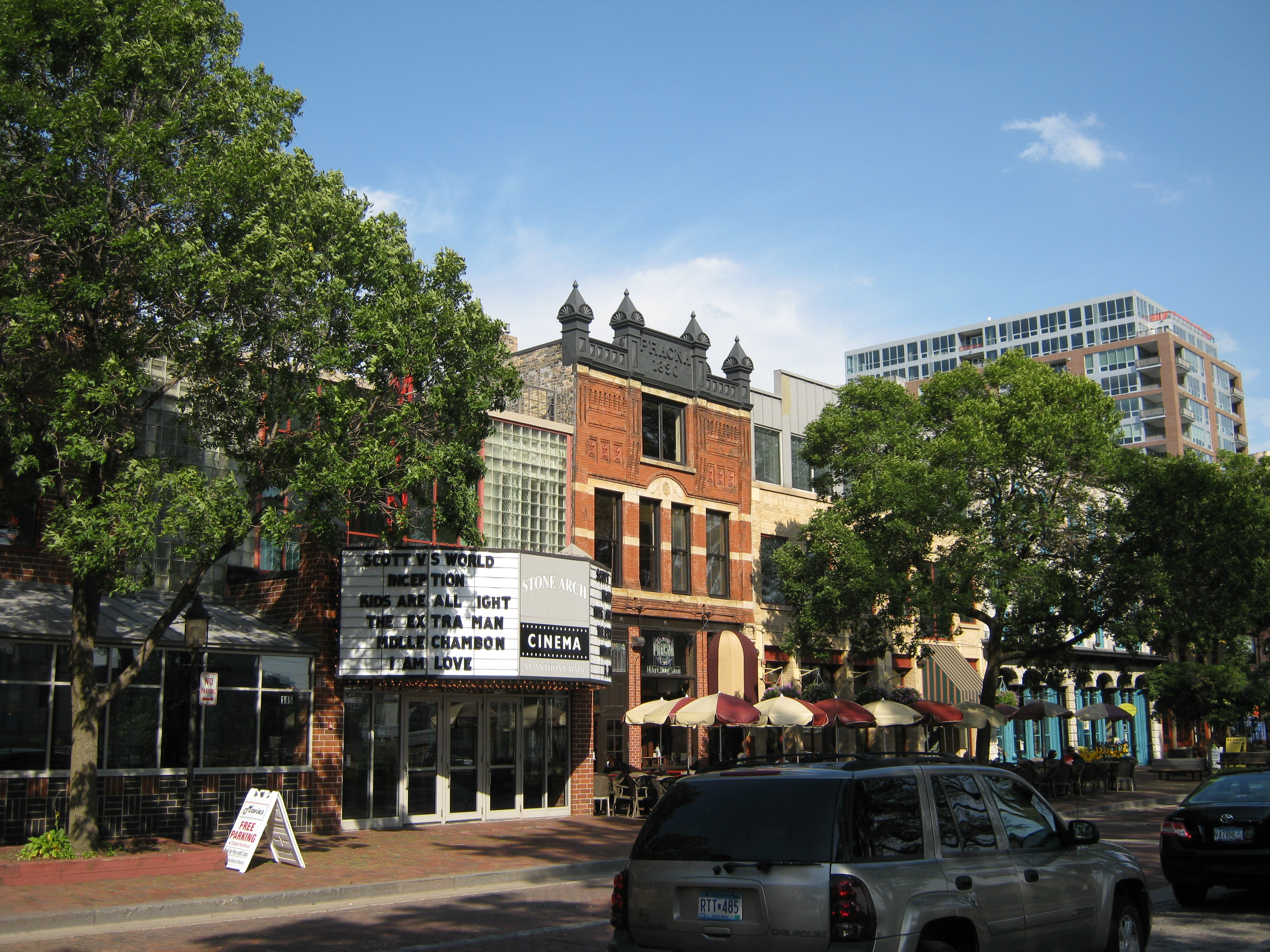
Pracna Building in Minneapolis

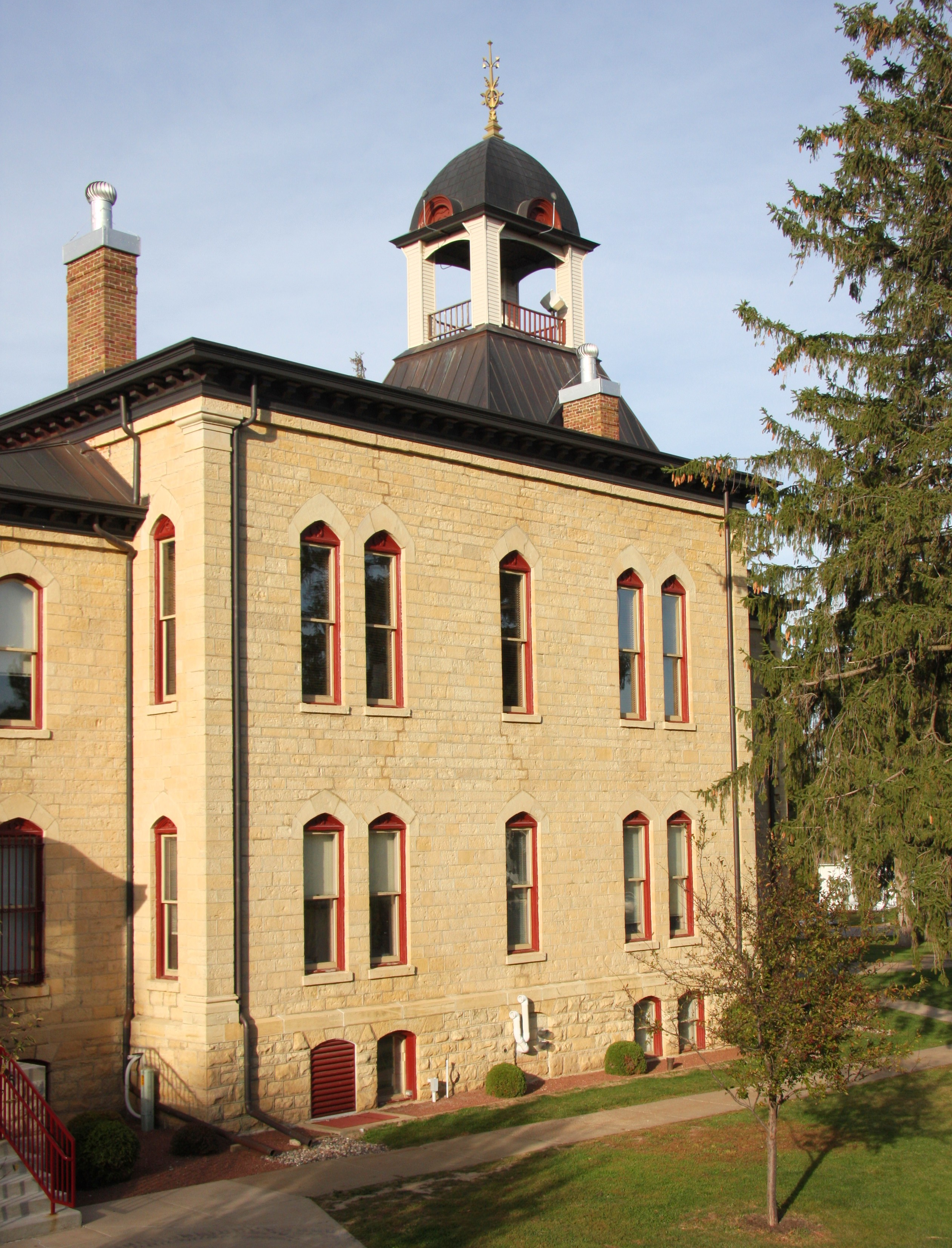
Vernon County Courthouse in Viroqua, Wisconsin
