= August Schell Brewing Company =

American brewing company

Coordinates: 44°17′20″N 94°27′2″W

- Location: 1860 Schell Rd; New Ulm, Minnesota; United States
- Opened: 1860
- Annual production volume: 145,000 US beer barrels (170,000 hL)

Active beers
Name	Type
Schell's Deer Brand	Pre-Prohibition American lager
Schell's Light	America Light lager
Schell's Amber	Red American lager
Schell's Firebrick	Vienna-Style Amber lager
Schell's Cream Ale	Cream Ale
Schell's IPA	India Pale Ale
Schell's Dark	American dark lager
Schell's LoCal Twist	Wheat Beer
Grain Belt Premium	American lager
Grain Belt Premium Light	Light lager
Grain Belt Nordeast	American Amber Lager
Grain Belt Elite	American Lager

Seasonal beers
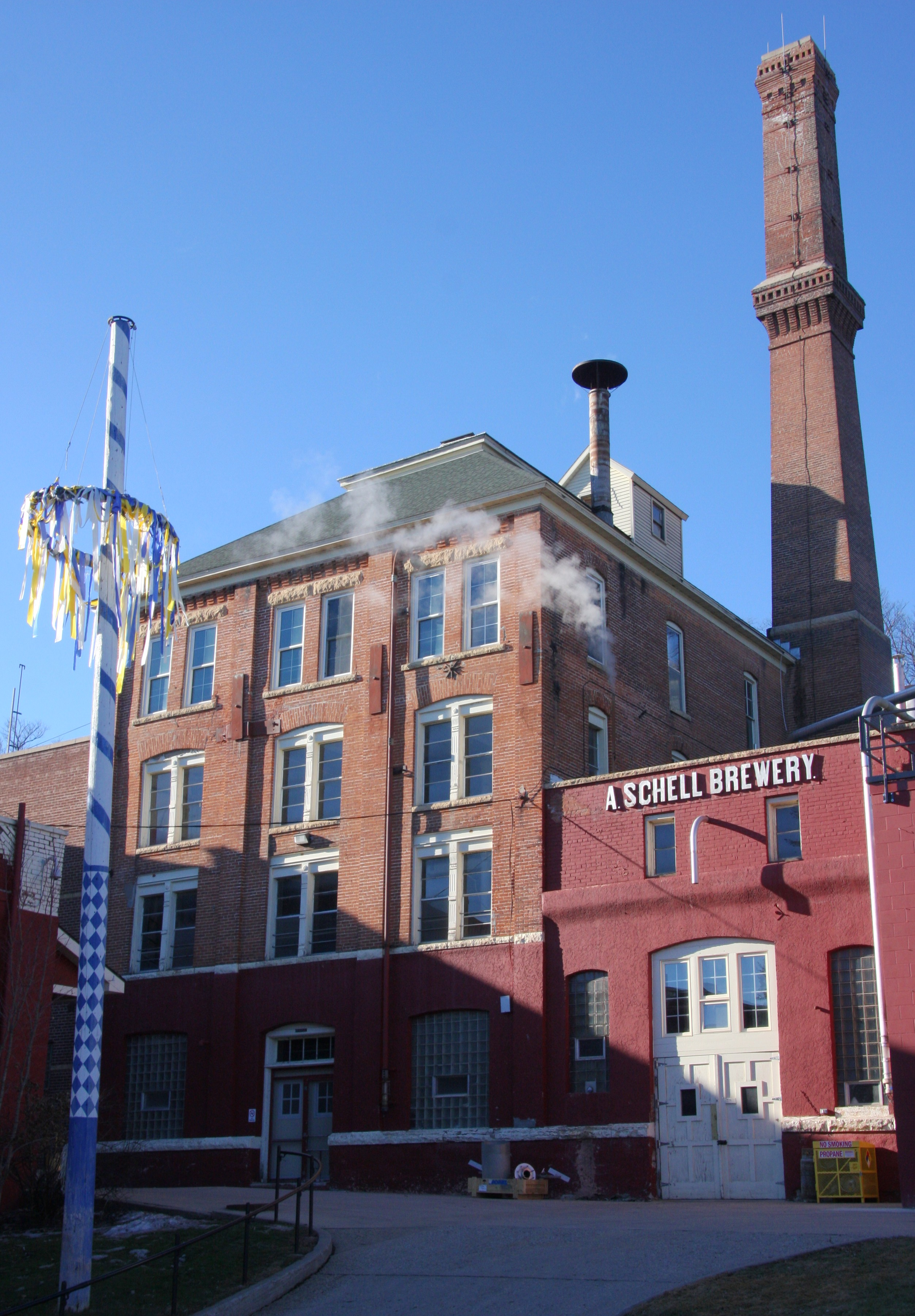
Name	Type
Schell's Bock	Bock
Schell's Goosetown	Gose
Schell's Hefeweizen	Bavarian Wheat
Schell's Oktoberfest	Marzen
Schell's Snowstorm	Changes Yearly
Schell's Sangria	Red Citrus Lager
Grain Belt BLU	Blueberry Lager
August Schell Brewing Company
U.S. National Register of Historic Places
The brewery in 2017
Location	1860 Schell Rd; New Ulm, Minnesota
NRHP reference No.	74001007
Added to NRHP	December 27, 1974

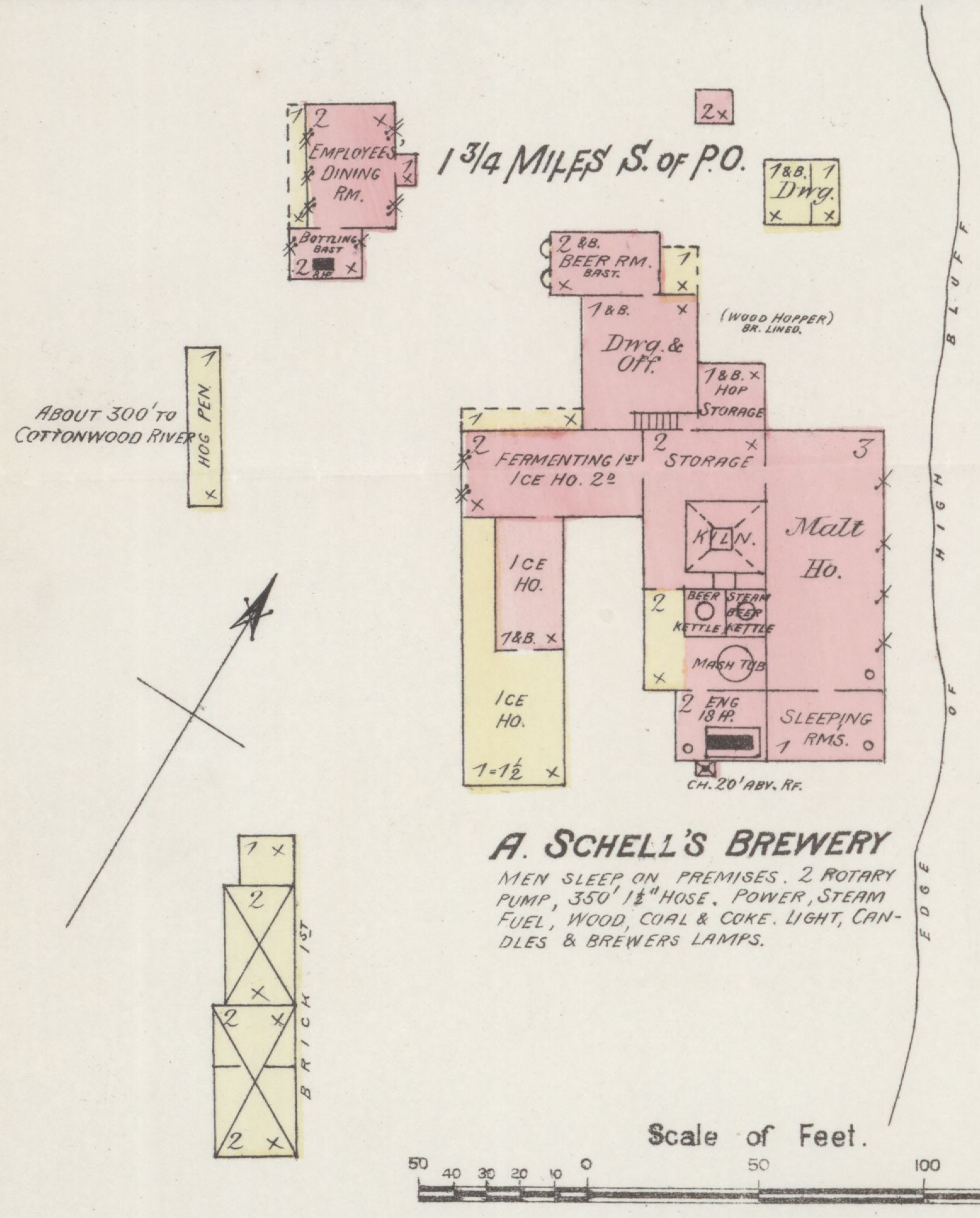
August Schell Brewery in the November 1884 Sanborn Fire Insurance Map

The August Schell Brewing Company is a brewing company in New Ulm, Minnesota, that was founded by German immigrant August Schell in 1860. It is the second oldest family-owned brewery in America (after D. G. Yuengling & Son) and became the oldest and largest brewery in Minnesota when the company bought the Grain Belt rights in 2002. In September 2010, the brewery celebrated its 150th anniversary with a two-day festival. Every year, Schell's also celebrates traditional German holidays with Bock Fest and Oktoberfest. The current brewery is owned and operated by the August Schell Brewing Company, a Minnesota corporation that was incorporated in 1902.

== History ==
August Schell (February 15, 1828, in Durbach, Grand Duchy of Baden – September 20, 1891, in New Ulm, Minnesota) emigrated to the United States in 1848. He worked in Cincinnati as a machinist before relocating to New Ulm with other members of the Turner Society. Upon moving to New Ulm, building on his experience as a machinist, he established a mill. In 1860, August Schell partnered with Jacob Bernhardt to found a brewery to serve the growing German immigrant population in the area. August and Jacob selected a site two miles from the heart of New Ulm along the Cottonwood River. While much of the city of New Ulm was damaged or burned during the Dakota War of 1862, the brewery was undamaged. In 1866, August Schell bought out his partner Jacob Bernhardt to take sole ownership of the brewery, starting an unbroken chain of family ownership that continues to this day. During this time, the brewery grew in size and production.

August Schell died in 1891 leaving the brewery to his wife Theresa Schell. Their son Otto took over managing the brewery. Otto had studied brewing back in the Schells' home country of Germany. As the 19th century became the 20th, Otto continued to modernize the brewery by adding refrigeration to the brewery. 1911 was a tragic year for the Schell family as first Otto and then Theresa died. At that time, George Marti, the husband of August's daughter Emma, took over managing and operating the brewery.

1919 brought about the passage of the 18th Amendment to the Constitution of the United States and implementation of Prohibition. The August Schell Brewing Company struggled along with many other American breweries. The brewery transitioned to producing "near-beer" (a low alcohol beer still permitted during Prohibition), soft drinks, and candy. Prohibition ended in 1933 with passage of the 21st Amendment. George Marti had successfully steered the brewery through Prohibition, but died shortly thereafter in 1934.

George's son Alfred ("Al") Marti became the President and Manager of the brewery upon the death of his father. Al ran the brewery until 1969 until he retired and passed leadership of the company to his son Warren Marti. During this time, the brewing industry was going through a period of consolidation and upheaval, and Schell's was not immune. At one point, the brewery only managed to keep its doors open by cutting down a large black walnut tree located on the grounds of the brewery and selling its lumber. During Warren's tenure, the brewery responded to its customers changing preferences by introducing Schell's Export Beer, Schell's Light Beer, and 1919 Root Beer (named after the year prohibition was implemented).

In 1984, Warren's son Ted Marti took over operations of the brewery and became President of the brewery in 1985. Having studied at the Siebels Institute of Brewing, Ted began expanding the line of beers offered by the Schell's Brewery. One of those beers, Schell's Pilsener, earned a gold medal at the Great American Beer Festival in 1988. Schell's continued to expand its beer offerings through the 1990s, brewing 38 different beers over that decade.

In 2002, Schell's Brewery expanded its reach by acquiring the recipe and branding for Grain Belt Beer. Upon moving production to its New Ulm Brewery, Schell's introduced additional Grain Belt varieties including Grain Belt Nordeast in 2010, Grain Belt Lock & Dam in 2016 (since retired), Grain Belt BLU in 2018 (after appearing at the Minnesota State Fair for several years), and Grain Belt Southwest Cerveza in 2019.

The next generation of the Marti family is increasing its involvement in the management and operation of the brewery. Ted's oldest son Jace Marti became a brewmaster in 2010 and has taken the lead on producing Schell's Noble Star line of sour Berliner Weisse beers. The brewery opened the Starkeller facility on the North side of New Ulm to produce the Noble Star line. This facility also houses a tap room dedicated to these sour ales. As of 2024, the Starkeller facility was no longer being used to produce mixed fermentation beers and Jace Marti departed Schell's to pursue distilling.

The brewery has continued to update its offerings by retiring long time brews such as Maifest, Schmaltz's Alt, and Pils among others, while adding an IPA, a Kolsch and Cream Ale. In 2020, it is expected that the brewery will release a line of hard seltzers as Grain Belt N'icebreakers as well as a low calorie Grain Belt Elite.

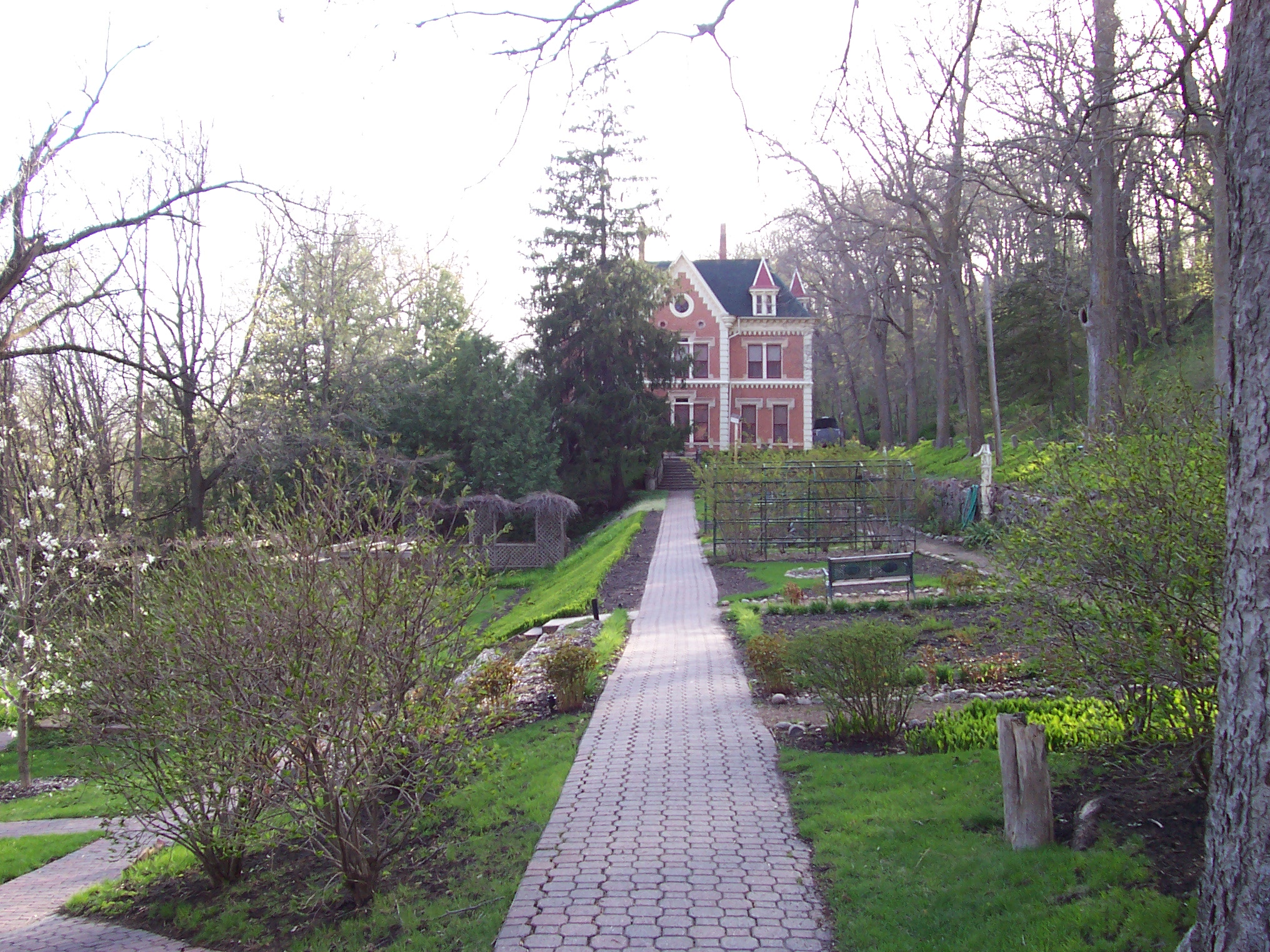
Mansion on grounds of August Schell Brewery.

== See also ==
- Barrel-aged beer
