= Ted Johnson (bandleader) =

Swedish-American violinist

Ted Johnson was a Swedish-American violinist, who led a popular Scandinavian dance band in the Twin Cities during the 1930s and 1940s.

== Biography ==
Swedish-American bandleader Ted Johnson

Born in 1903 to parents from the Swedish province of Skåne, Johnson grew up in the Cedar-Riverside neighborhood of Minneapolis, where Scandinavian music was frequently heard in the lodges and meeting halls. In the 1920s he embarked on a musical career, accompanying the singer Olle i Skratthult and later joining the Danielson Brothers Orchestra.

Throughout the 1930s and 1940s Ted Johnson led a group variously known as the "Nordvest Skandinavisk Orkester" and "Ted Johnson and his Midnight Suns". The violin and accordion-based ensemble played in a light and lively style unlike that of German brass bands. For many years they were the house band at the Stockholm Cafe in the heart of the Minneapolis Swedish quarter. They played at Dania Hall, Norway Hall, the Uptown Auditorium, the Prom Ballroom and other Twin Cities venues. Appearances on local radio stations (WCCO, WDGY and WTCN) and records on the Columbia and Vocalion labels spread their fame throughout the Upper Midwest.

In the 1930s Ted Johnson and the Thorstein Skarning were the leading Nordic bandleaders in the Twin Cities as well as good friends. The Minnesota Historical Society has an autographed photo of Skarning that he inscribed to his "old friend Ted Johnson, violinist par excellence."

After the 1940s Johnson performed with "The Scandinavian Four" and with his wife and daughter as the "Ted Johnson Trio". In 1977 he issued the LP "Gammaldans!" with fifteen songs recorded by his orchestras of the 1930s and 1940s.

Johnson's choice of material was influenced by his time spent with the Olle i Skratthult band, and his discography had several songs in common with that group. A similar artist was Edwin Hoberg, who as leader of the "Little Oscar Gang" drew heavily on Olle's repertoire for his mid-1930s songbook.

== The Snoose Boulevard Festival ==
The Snoose Boulevard Festival was held in the Cedar-Riverside neighborhood of Minneapolis from 1972 through 1977. In the late 19th century Cedar Avenue became known as “Snoose Boulevard”, a nickname often given to the main street in Scandinavian communities. The term derived from the residents’ fondness for snus (snuff), an inexpensive form of tobacco. The event, which celebrated the area's Scandinavian past, featured the music, food, and arts of the immigrants who had once lived there. It also highlighted the careers of Olle i Skratthult (Hjalmar Peterson), Slim Jim and the Vagabond Kid (Ernest and Clarence Iverson) and the Olson Sisters (Eleonora and Ethel Olson).

The headline performer was the Swedish-born singer Anne-Charlotte Harvey. In conjunction with the festival she recorded three albums of folk tunes, emigrant ballads, hymns, waltzes and comic songs. The non-profit Olle i Skratthult Project sponsored the annual celebration and the recordings. Harvey's albums, produced by the renowned ethnomusicologist Maury Bernstein, included three songs from Ted Johnson's repertoire.

== Gallery ==
Dania Hall 1890

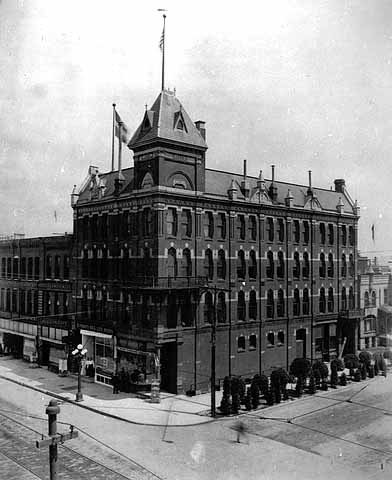
Dania Hall 1906

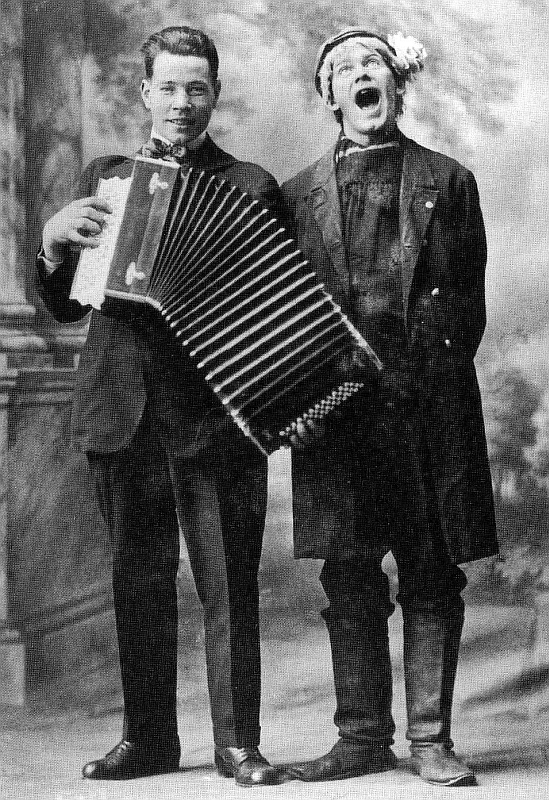
L to R: Gustav Nyberg and Olle i Skratthult 1916

Thorstein Skarning and his Norwegian Hillbillies 1938
