= Vernon County Courthouse (Wisconsin) =

- U.S. National Register of Historic Places
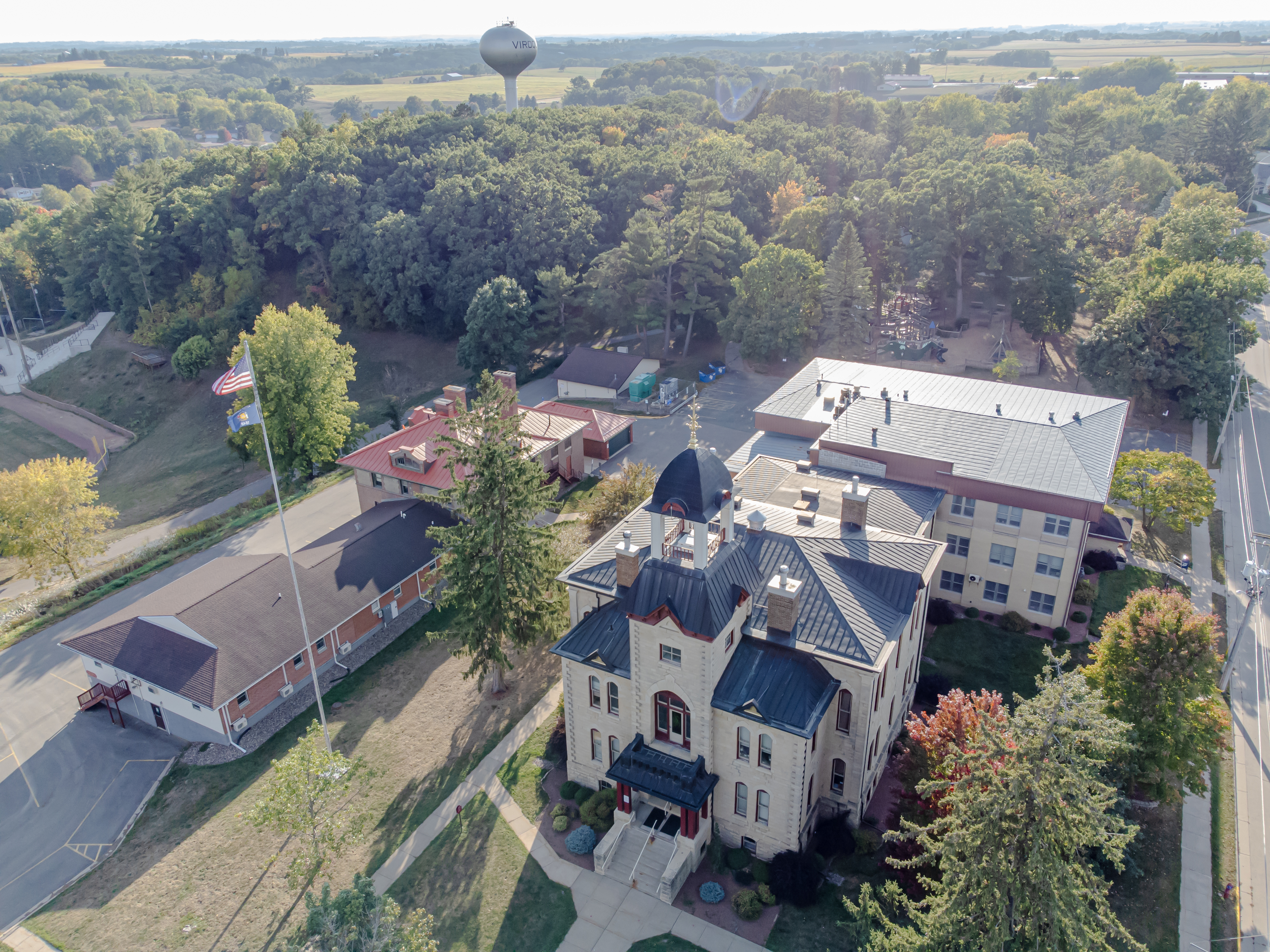

- Location within Wisconsin
- Location: N. Dunlap Ave., Viroqua, Wisconsin
- Coordinates: 43°33′24″N 90°53′35″W
- Area: 3.1 acres (1.3 ha)
- Built: 1880 (courthouse); c.1910 (jail)
- Architect: Carl F. Struck
- Architectural style: Late 19th And 20th Century Revivals, Gothic
- NRHP reference No.: 80000200
- Added to NRHP: January 8, 1980

The Vernon County Courthouse in Viroqua, Wisconsin, was built in 1880. It was listed on the National Register of Historic Places in 1980.

The courthouse was designed in High Victorian Gothic style by Norwegian immigrant architect Carl F. Struck. It is a two-story limestone building with a three-story tower and belfry.

Murals inside include a scene of settlers arriving in wild Vernon County painted by Leighton Oyen of LaCrosse.

The listing includes a second contributing building, a sheriff's office and jail building with a red clay tiled hipped roof, built c.1910.
