= Schloss Thorn =

Building in Rhineland-Palatinate, Germany

Coordinates: 49°33′07″N 6°23′01″E

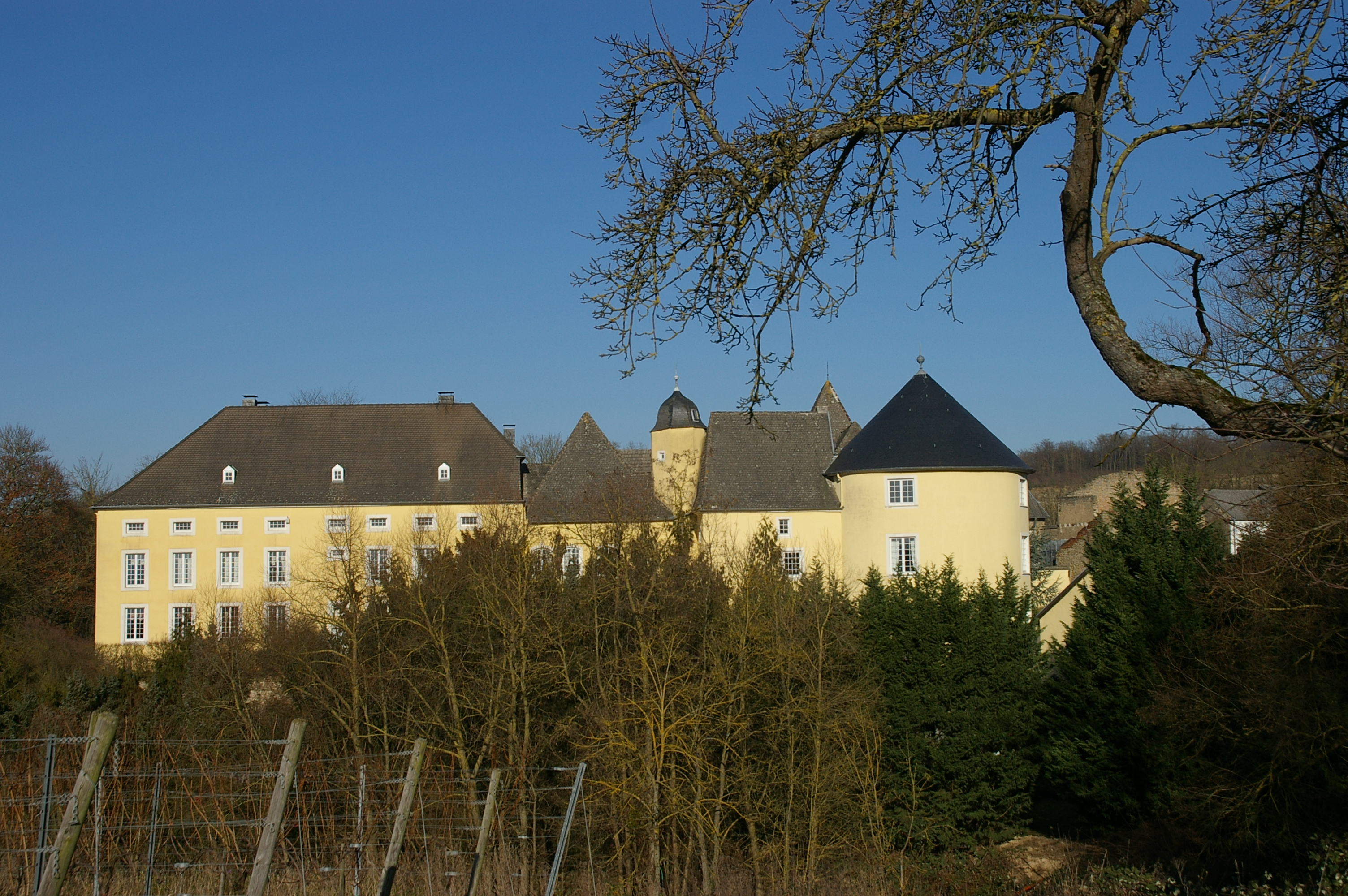

Schloss Thorn is a former castle, that has been turned into a stately home. It lies in the locality of Schloss Thorn, in the municipality of Palzem in the Landkreis Trier-Saarburg, Rhineland-Palatinate. The current owners are the Barons von Hobe-Gelting.

Schloss Thorn is still in use as a residence today, and wine is produced from the surrounding vineyards, which have been family-owned since 1534, like the castle. It is the oldest castle vineyard on the Moselle; it also has the only preserved tree wine press of Europe.

== Location ==
Schloss Thorn stands on a hillock that overlooks the access to the Moselle valley and to the Saargau. It is the south-western corner of the Landkreis Trier-Saarburg. It lies just across the river from the Luxembourg town of Remich.

== History ==
Due to the existence of a ford here, the Romans built a guard tower on a protruding rock here to protect and observe the crossing. This tower would give the later medieval castle its name, the Latin "turris" meaning "tower".

Schloss Thorn was built on the ruins of the probably rectangular, medieval castle guarded by round corner towers. Until the 16th century it was a fief of the lords of Rollingen (hereditary marshals of Luxembourg) to the lords of Bübingen. Then it passed to the ownership of the lords of Musiel, where it remained until the end of the 19th century. It had become decrepit by the end of the 15th century, and was rebuilt in 1536 by the new owner apart from two towers and a part of the defensive wall. In 1800, it was rebuilt by the owning family into more of a stately home and the old defensive buildings were turned into garden terraces.

One of the two towers left after the 16th-century renovations, the round tower at the south-eastern corner was destroyed by bombardment in 1945. The second, a rectangular tower that used to be inhabitable, is now a gate tower.

Due to the rebuilding and renovation work carried over hundreds of years, the castle now shows characteristics of the architectural styles of the Middle Ages, through to the Renaissance, Baroque and Empire styles.
