= Boesch, Hummel, and Maltzahn Block =

- U.S. National Register of Historic Places
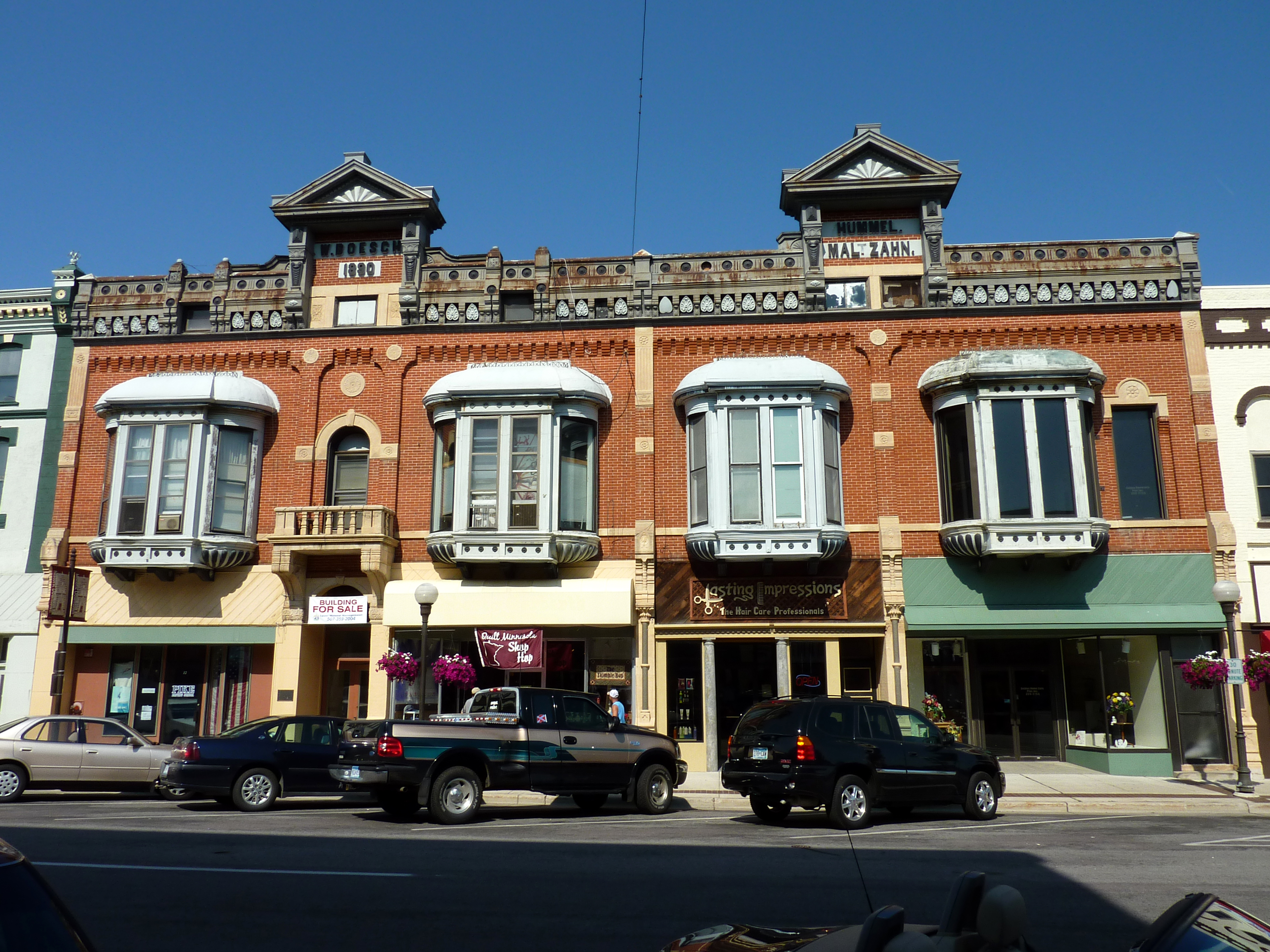

- Location within Minnesota Location within the United States
- Location: 6-12 N. Minnesota St., New Ulm, Minnesota
- Coordinates: 44°18′49″N 94°27′32″W
- Area: less than one acre
- Built: 1890
- Architect: Carl F. Struck
- MPS: Brown County MRA
- NRHP reference No.: 79001201
- Added to NRHP: December 31, 1979

The Boesch, Hummel, and Maltzahn Block, also referred to as the Boesch-Hummel-Maltzahn Block, is an historic building in New Ulm, Minnesota, United States. The private commercial structure was placed on the National Register of Historic Places (NRHP) on December 31, 1979. The building is significant for the extensive features of the front facade as compared to the other "Main Street" buildings in New Ulm and surrounding communities.

== Structure ==
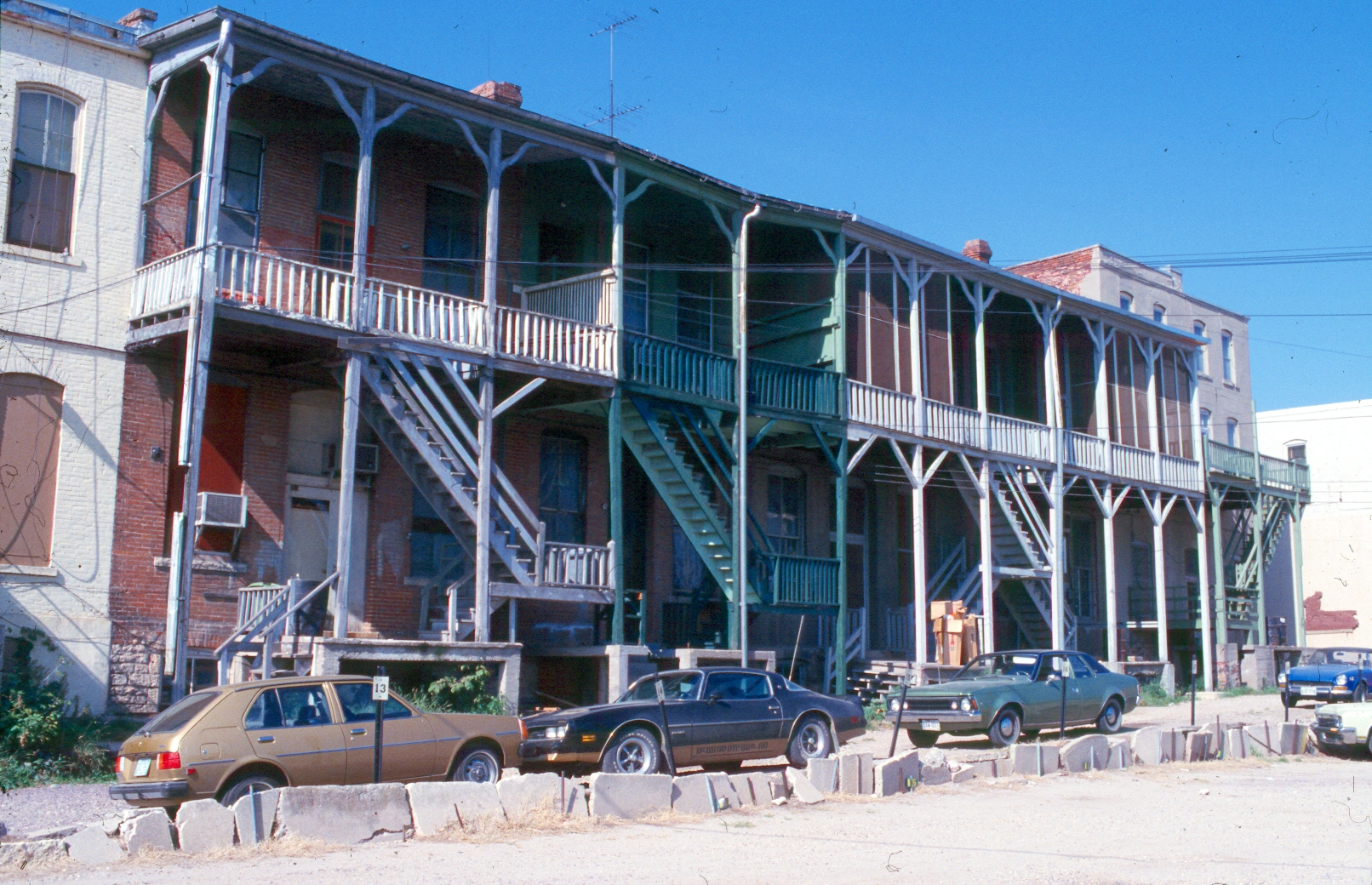
The eastern (rear) of the building, which once had wooden stairways and covered walkways for upstairs apartments.

The Boesch, Hummel, and Maltzahn Block is a two-story structure located on the north side of New Ulm's main commercial thoroughfare, consisting of 6, 8, 10 and 12 Minnesota Street North. The street level facade has been remodeled several times over the years, but still maintains the cut stone dividing members. The second story facade features relief-laid brick and four, large copper-roofed bay windows. Cut stone is also used as decoration on the second level as well as for a railed balcony over the stairway entrance on the northern section of the facade. Panels carrying the names of the persons first associated with the structure, as well as its completion year, are incorporated into an elaborate metal cornice. The rear of the building, which once had wooden stairways and two levels of covered walkways, now has metal stairways for building access.

== History ==
William Hummel was born on October 22, 1832, in Neuffen, Württemberg, then a part of the German Confederation. He was reared by his paternal grandparents His grandfather was a tanner by trade. From age seven to twelve, he attended school and in 1844, his parents immigrated to the United States, taking him along. The voyage was difficult, with various problems leading to spending 138 days on a ship. Of the more than 300 German immigrants in their group, 28 died on the trip and seven babies were born. They arrived in New Orleans in early March 1845, and soon his family moved to Cincinnati where they began work at an uncle's vineyard. After the harvest, the family returned to New Orleans where they began trade in food stuffs. After a year of success, Hummel's father died of yellow fever. This caused serious financial hardship for his mother and four siblings. As the oldest, Hummel began working at a drug store, receiving at the time $8.00 per month and board. After a time he was sent back to Cincinnati to learn a trade where his uncle taught him to be a harness maker. Soon after there was a cholera outbreak, shutting down businesses and causing Hummel to look for new work. Finding employment as an apprentice trunk-maker, he was able to earn a stable living. In 1850 he joined the Cincinnati Turner Society, reemerging himself in German customs and language. The Turner Society appealed to Hummel, particularly because of its advocacy of intellectual freedom. He began working on the steamers on the Ohio and Mississippi Rivers, earning more money and seeing more parts of the country. In 1852, he arrived in St. Louis, Missouri, where he found maternal relatives who convinced him to stay and find work. Six months later, he moved to Chicago and continued his involvement in the local Turner Society.

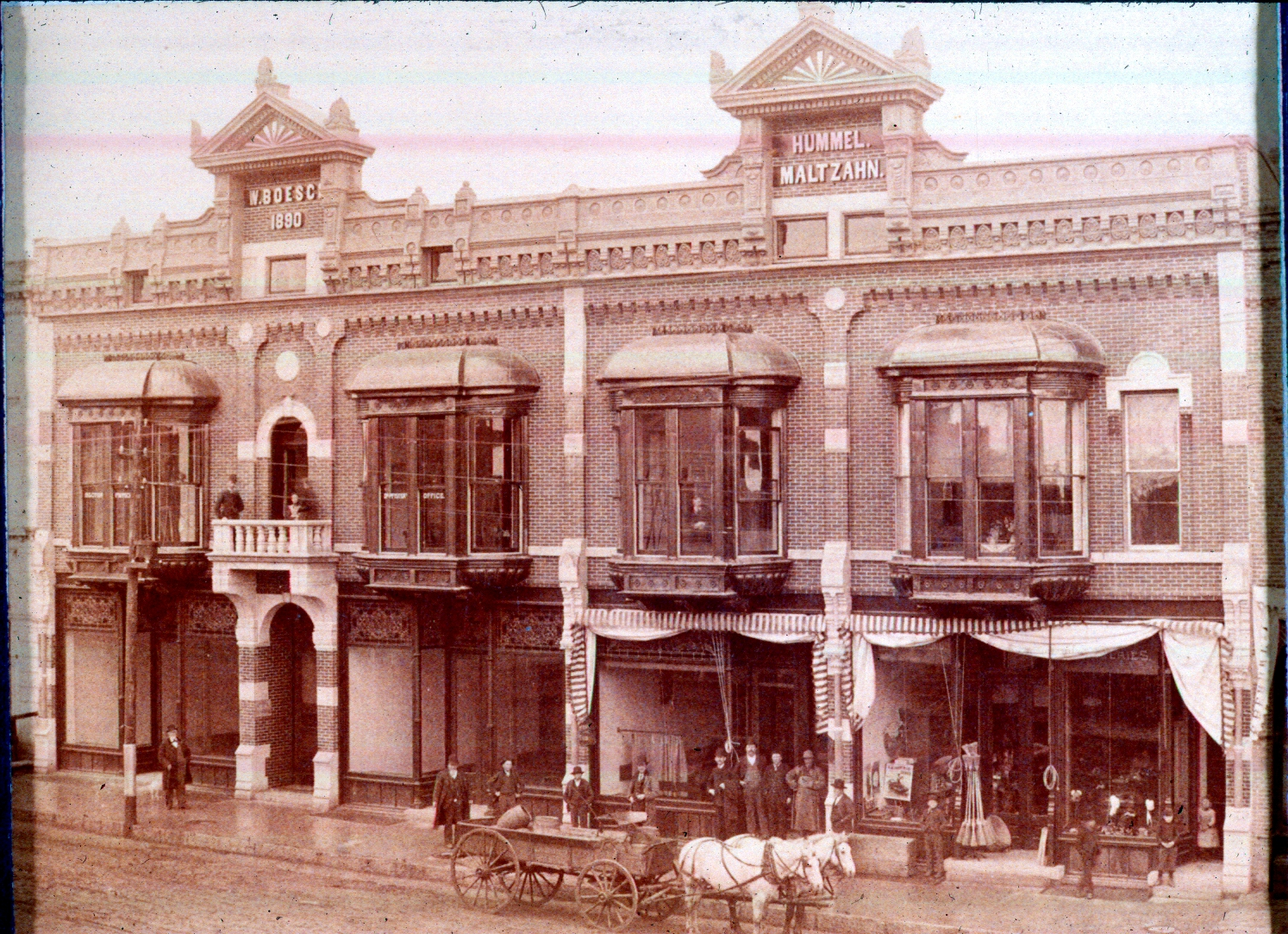
The Boesch, Hummel, and Maltzahn Block in its early years; note the original storefronts.

Hummel moved to New Ulm in 1856, soon after its founding, and helped form its own Turner Society and taught gymnastics in the new hall. He tried making a living in several areas including farming, operating a drug store and running a saloon, before co-founding the New Ulm Creamery Company in 1880 and finding success. With the profits he opened a general store on Minnesota Street in downtown New Ulm. By 1890 he was one of the most successful businessmen in the city, he joined Werner Boesch and Edward Maltzahn to open a new business block. They hired architect Carl F. Struck of Minneapolis, who had previously designed the Brown County Courthouse. When the structure was built in 1890, the structure was part of the second generation of masonry blocks built to house retail establishments in New Ulm and the surrounding area; it is considered to be the most visually striking of that generation. Hummel continued running the store until 1903.

== Significance ==
The Boesch, Hummel, and Maltzahn Block is noted for being the most elaborately detailed Main Street commercial building in the area. Similar buildings are commonly stripped of features such as cornices and projecting bay windows over time and various renovations. The wide, four-storefront facade, resulting in repetition add to the structure's impact on the local streetscape. The building was originally designed to house commercial storefronts on the first level with apartments on the second; the building continued to be used in this way at the time it was listed on the NRHP.
