= Karl Friedrich Bernhard Hellmuth von Hobe =

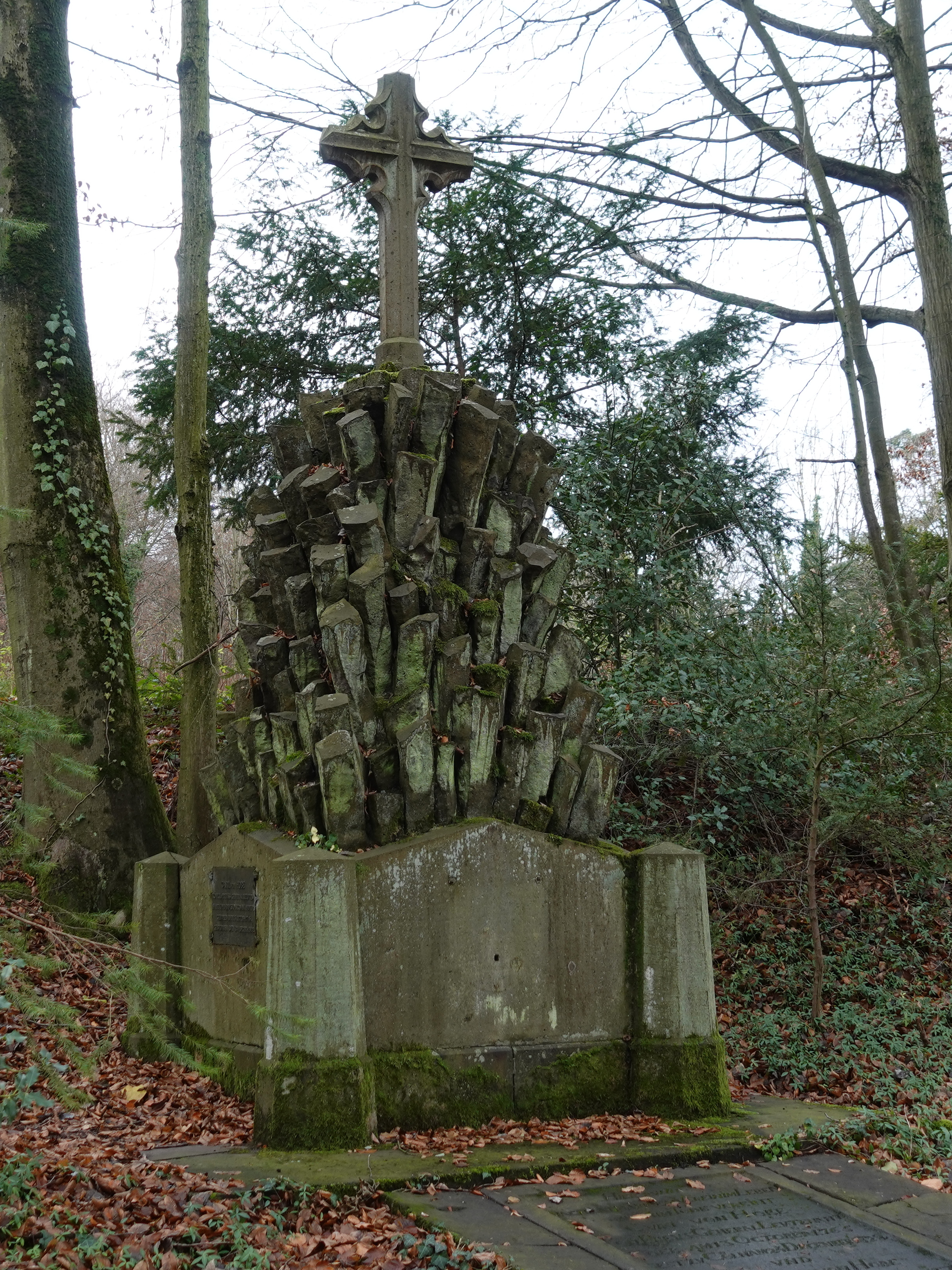

Lieutenant General Karl Friedrich Bernhard Helmuth von Hobe (16 October 1765 in Jürgenstorf – 25 December 1822 in Cologne) was a German officer of the Prussian Army during the Napoleonic Wars and the War of the Seventh Coalition. He was a Knight of the Order Pour le Mérite (awarded 1814 with Oak Leaves).

== See also ==
- Hobe (family)
