= Bardwell–Ferrant House =

Historic house in Minnesota, United States

- Bardwell-Ferrant House
- U.S. National Register of Historic Places
- Minneapolis Landmark
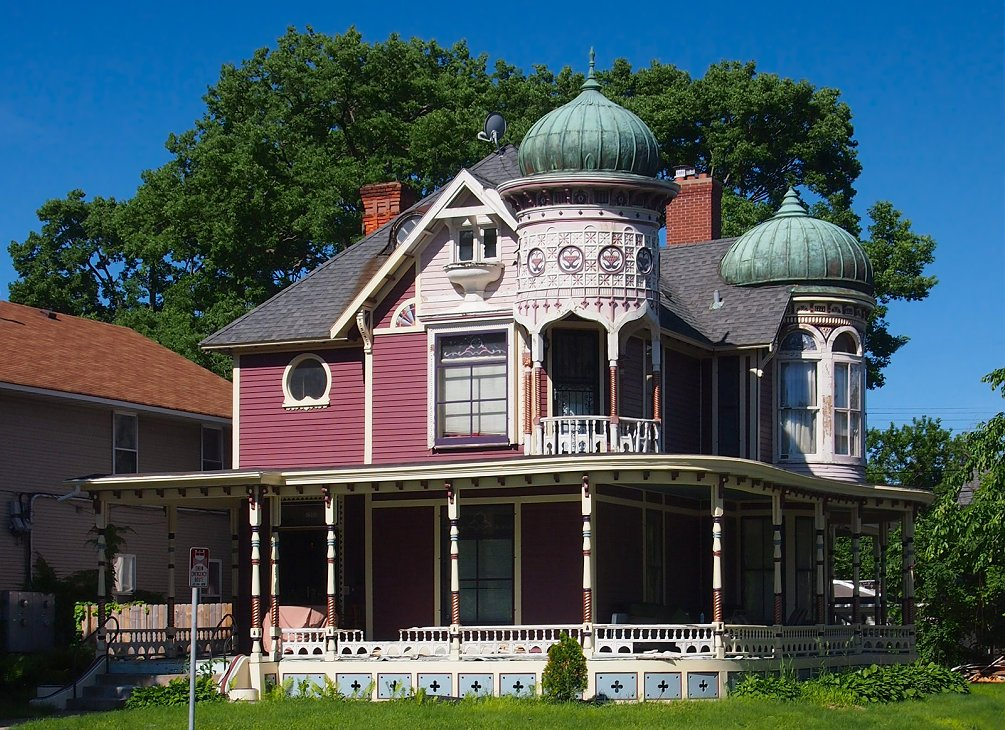
- The Bardwell-Ferrant House from the east-northeast

- Location within Minnesota Location within the United States
- Location: 2500 Portland Avenue, Minneapolis, Minnesota
- Coordinates: 44°57′25.7″N 93°16′5″W
- Area: Less than one acre
- Built: 1883
- Architect: Struck, Carl F.
- Architectural style: Queen Anne, Moorish Revival
- NRHP reference No.: 84001416

Significant dates
- Added to NRHP: August 9, 1984
- Designated MPLSL: 1983

The Bardwell–Ferrant House is a house in the Phillips West neighborhood of Minneapolis, Minnesota, United States. It was built in 1883 at 1800 Park Avenue for its first owner, Charles Bardwell, and its original plan was in the Queen Anne style. In 1890 its second owner, Emil Ferrant, had the house remodeled in the Moorish Revival style that was popular at the time. Norwegian-born architect Carl F. Struck added two onion domed towers, a wraparound porch with spindlework columns, ogee arches, and deep-toned stained glass windows. The house was later moved to its present location at 2500 Portland Ave. S. in 1898 to make way for a bank building.

The house was listed on the National Register of Historic Places in 1984. It was nominated based on it being a locally significant example of the late 19th-century interest in exotic revival architecture. Architect Carl Struck was the only Norwegian-born architect who practiced this style in Minneapolis. Struck was also responsible for designing Dania Hall in 1885, which was listed on the National Register in 1974 but destroyed by fire in 2000. There were few buildings originally built in the Moorish Revival style; the usual practice was to apply these forms to structures built in simpler styles. The Bardwell-Ferrant house is an unusually picturesque representative of this practice, making it locally significant.

In 1986 partners Mary Lou Maxwell and Jean Steward bought the house and renovated it, subdividing it into four apartments. At the time, the house was structurally sound, but significant mechanical work was required, including new heating, electrical, and plumbing systems. Thieves had also stolen some of the stained glass windows and tile from the fireplace mantels. After the renovation, three of the four apartments had two stories, and all were outfitted with new appliances. Much of the siding on the exterior was replaced, and it was repainted in a mauve color (the Victorian term for this color was "ashes of roses"). The trim was painted in a cream color, and the pressed metal trim on the towers was painted with other colors to complement the stained glass windows.

The home was sold again in 2001 and later fell into foreclosure. In 2011 a new owner purchased the home with an eye toward restoring the house to a single family home. During the period of foreclosure the home suffered from vandalism and damage including structural issues, several fireplace mantels that had been pried away from the walls, damage to several of the stained glass windows and theft of some of the home's copper pipe and wiring.

== See also ==
- National Register of Historic Places listings in Hennepin County, Minnesota
