= Thorstein Skarning =

Norwegian-born musician and bandleader

- Born: November 30, 1888; Drammen, Norway
- Died: October 3, 1939 (aged 50); Fargo, North Dakota
- Spouse: Anna Christine Kessell
- Children: Thorstein, Osmund

Thorstein Skarning (1888–1939) was a Norwegian-born musician and bandleader, who toured the Upper Midwest for over two decades and was a Twin Cities radio personality in the 1930s.

== Accordion virtuoso ==
Skarning, who grew up near Drammen, Norway, immigrated to the United States in 1909 and by 1917 had begun performing in the new country. From the beginning his wife Anna joined him as a pianist and vocalist. In 1925 they were greeted in Grand Forks, North Dakota by a large crowd that filled American Hall to capacity for a program of Norwegian folk dances, Grieg recital pieces and sentimental ballads. A review in the Grand Forks Herald praised the "celebrated accordionist", who played solo versions of Den store, hvide flok and Solveigs sang during one set. It referred to his "charming wife" and called her a "singer of note", who captivated listeners while singing Breil's Song of the soul and Hvalbye's Å, mor.

Advertised as the "world's greatest accordion virtuoso" and "greatest player of classical music on the accordion", Skarning demonstrated his skill before rapt audiences and enthusiastic dancers alike. The high-brow fare was not to everyone's liking. At the MWA hall in Strum, Wisconsin the crowd showed "little appreciation of a Mozart sonata but raised the roof when he stooped to rip off a Norwegian hop waltz." In 1925 when Skarning and his musicians had an engagement in Blair, Wisconsin, the local newspaper wrote: "This company never fails to please and their every appearance here is greeted with a packed house. After the musical entertainment is over, the players play for the dancers —and this is where both Mr. Skarning and his people come in for a rousing good time."

== Recordings ==
A master of the chromatic button accordion, Skarning recorded "Skarning's Mazurka", "Vals Brilliante" and a few other tunes while still in Norway. Five of these numbers are on the 2017 album "Trekkspillnostalgi fra Modum og Eiker" (Accordion nostalgia from Modum and Eiker) and available through iTunes and Amazon mp3. In 1918 Skarning made a trial recording of "Old Comrades" (Alte Kameraden) for Victor Records. The same year he released four songs on Columbia Records. In 1930 he put out two songs on the Brunswick label.

== Popular artist ==
Skarning adapted to the changing tastes of the public and during the 1930s performed with his sons Thorstein and Osmund as "Thorstein Skarning and his Norwegian Hillbillies", a group whose broadcasts aired three times a week on WDGY radio in Minneapolis. One of their most popular numbers was a country western rendition of Farvel Mit Fædreland (Emigrantvalsen).

The violinist Ted Johnson and musicians Ernest and Clarence Iverson also played in a hybrid manner that was both Scandinavian and American. In the early 1930s Skarning and Ted Johnson were the leading Nordic bandleaders in the Twin Cities as well as good friends. The Minnesota Historical Society has an autographed photo of Skarning that he inscribed to his "old friend Ted Johnson, violinist par excellence."

Thorstein Skarning died in 1939, but his son Thorstein kept the orchestra going into the 1950s, promoting it as "the only Norske band in the United States featuring old style mixed music."

== Gallery ==
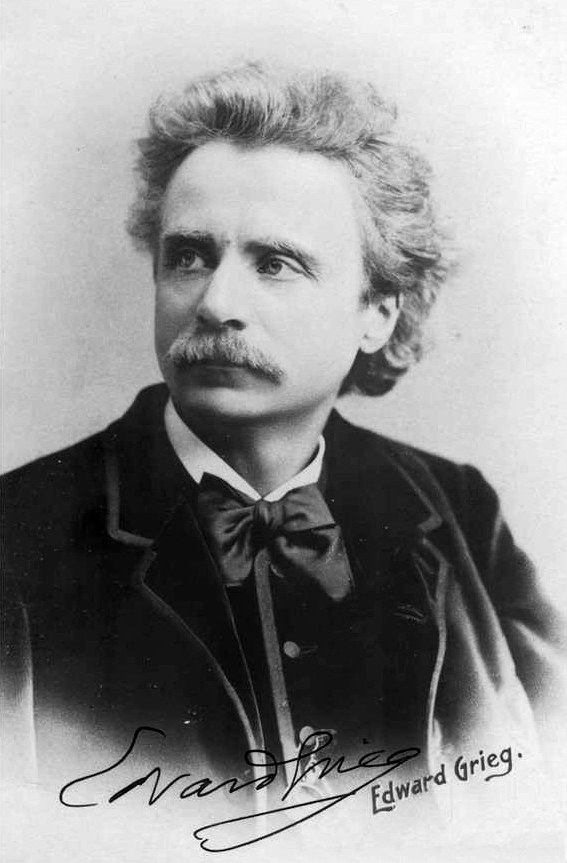
Edvard Grieg

Ted Johnson

Ernest and Clarence Iverson
