= E. H. Hobe House-Solheim =

Historic house in Minnesota, United States

- U.S. National Register of Historic Places
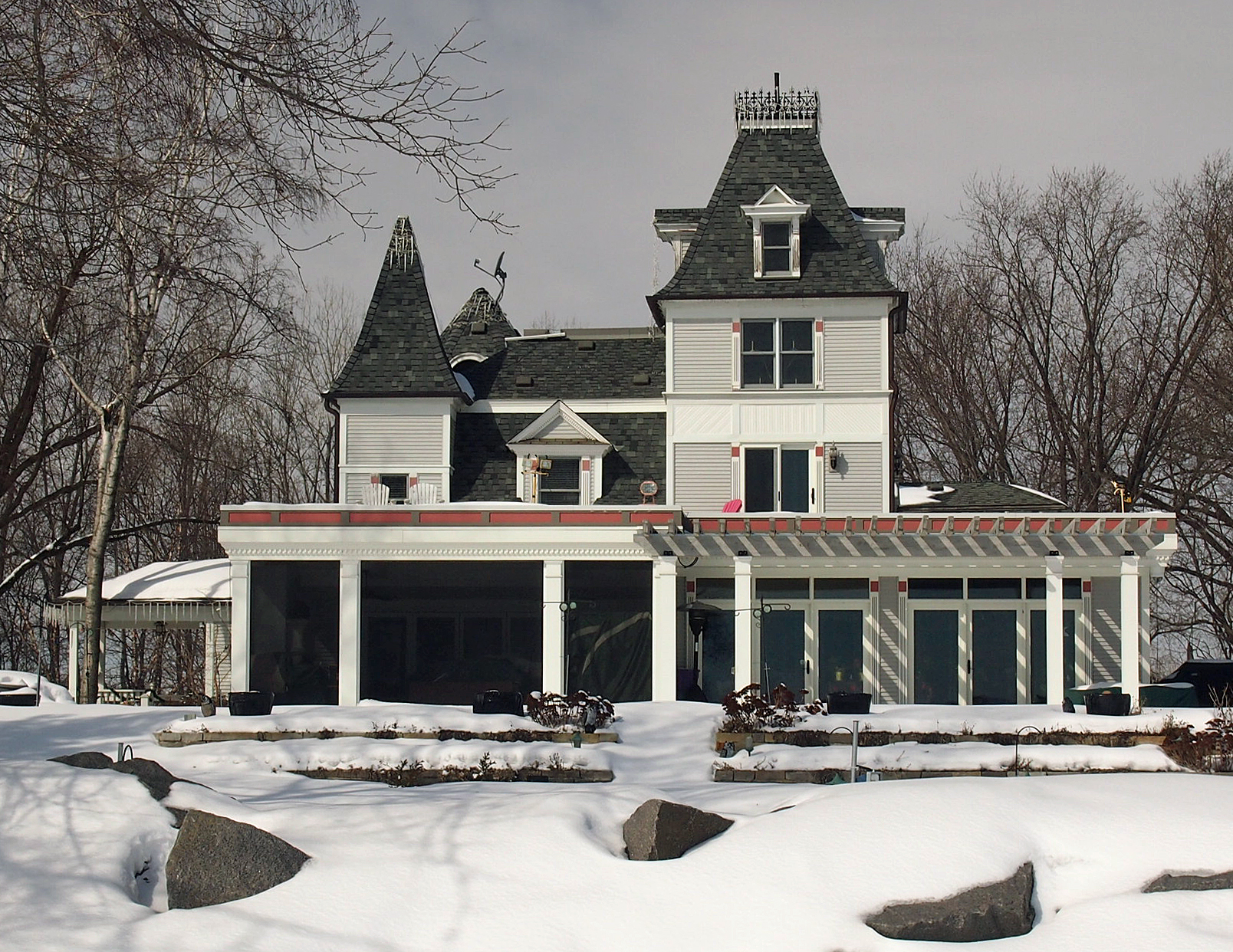
- The E. H. Hobe House from Bald Eagle Lake

- Location within Minnesota Location within the United States
- Location: 5590 Bald Eagle Boulevard West; White Bear Lake, Minnesota
- Coordinates: 45°6′37″N 93°1′35″W
- Built: 1897
- Architect: C.F. Struck
- Architectural style: Late Victorian
- NRHP reference No.: 83000933
- Added to NRHP: May 19, 1983

The E. H. Hobe House or Solheim (Norwegian for "Home of the Sun") was built in 1897 by Engelbrecht H. Hobe, a Norwegian immigrant, who worked for the newspaper Nordvesten, was a lumber dealer, steam-ship agent, and who became Vice-Consul, then Consul to the Norwegian-Swedish Kingdoms. The Victorian home was visited by Swedish King Gustav V and Crown Prince Olav and Princess Märtha of Norway. In 1918, Hobe purchased the Phillip J. Reilly house in St. Paul (565 Dayton Avenue), and thereafter used Solheim primarily as a summer home. The estate on Bald Eagle Lake was designed by Minneapolis architect Carl F. Struck.
