= Grain Belt (beer) =

Minnesota-based lager beer

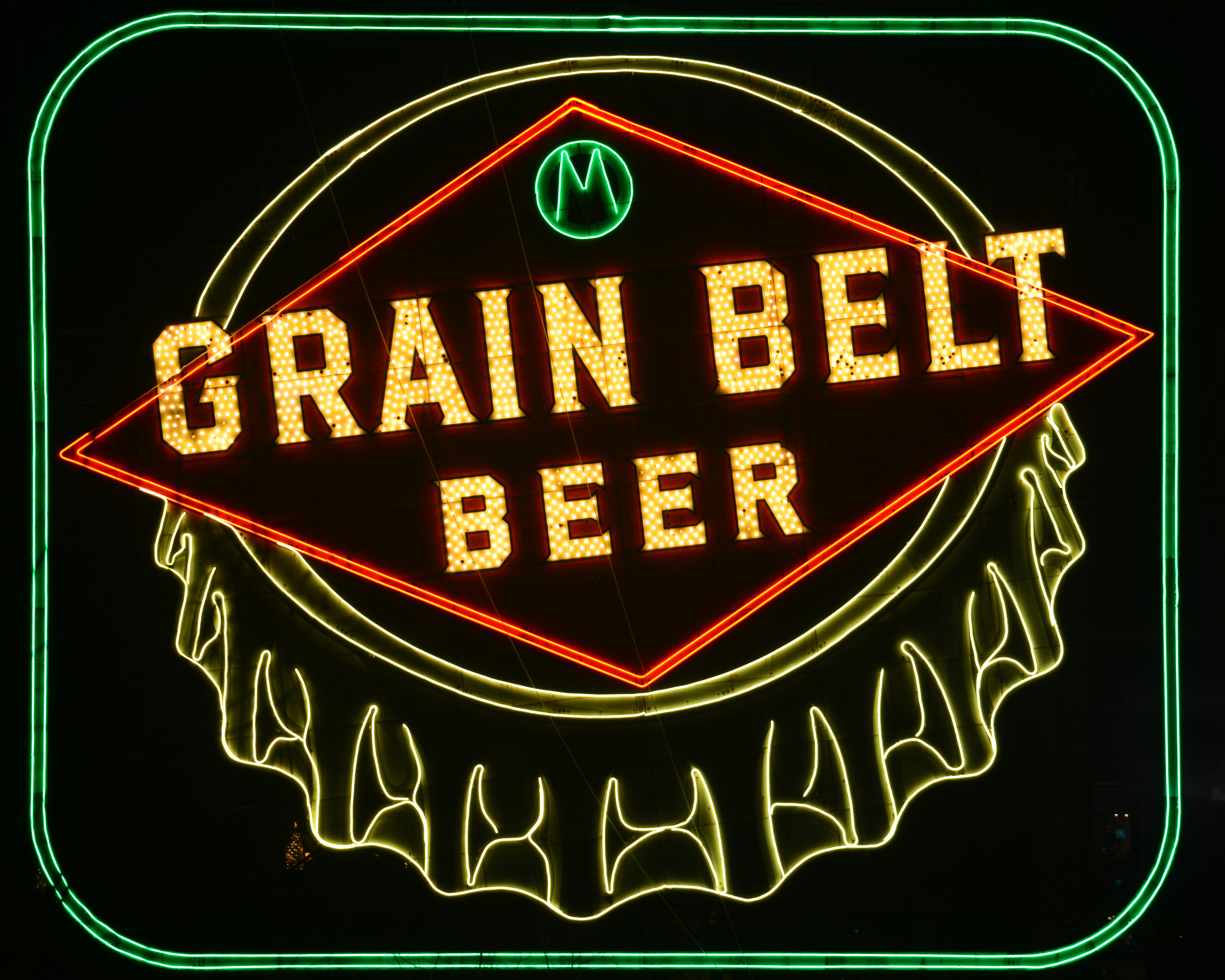
Grain Belt sign in downtown Minneapolis immediately after 2017 relighting

Grain Belt is a brand of beer brewed in the American state of Minnesota, by the August Schell Brewing Company. The beer has been produced in a number of varieties. Grain Belt Golden was the original style introduced in 1893. The current offerings are: Grain Belt Premium, first introduced in 1947; Grain Belt Premium Light; Grain Belt Nordeast, introduced on April 7, 2010; and the newest offering, Grain Belt Lock & Dam, introduced in 2016. It was originally produced by the Minneapolis Brewing Company which formed with the merger of four smaller brewers in 1891. Soon after introduction, Grain Belt became the company's flagship product. It was brewed at the original Grain Belt brewery in Minneapolis, Minnesota until 1976. A series of other owners followed, and Schell took over the product line in 2002.

== History ==
=== Name and logo ===
The name refers to the "Grain Belt" of the American Midwest where much of the world's supply of barley, corn, soybeans and other grains are produced. The diamond-shaped logo was introduced early on, though it wasn't until the late 1930s that a rendering of a bottlecap was added in the background.

=== Early history ===
The Grain Belt name first appeared in 1893 as the "Golden Grain Belt Old Lager," then brewed by the Minneapolis Brewing Company. The Minneapolis Brewing Company was a conglomerate of four other Minneapolis-based breweries, formed in 1890 by the consolidation of the F.D. Noerenberg Brewery, John Orth Brewing Company, Heinrich Brewing Association, and Germania Brewing Association. It was one of the largest breweries in the United States at that time.

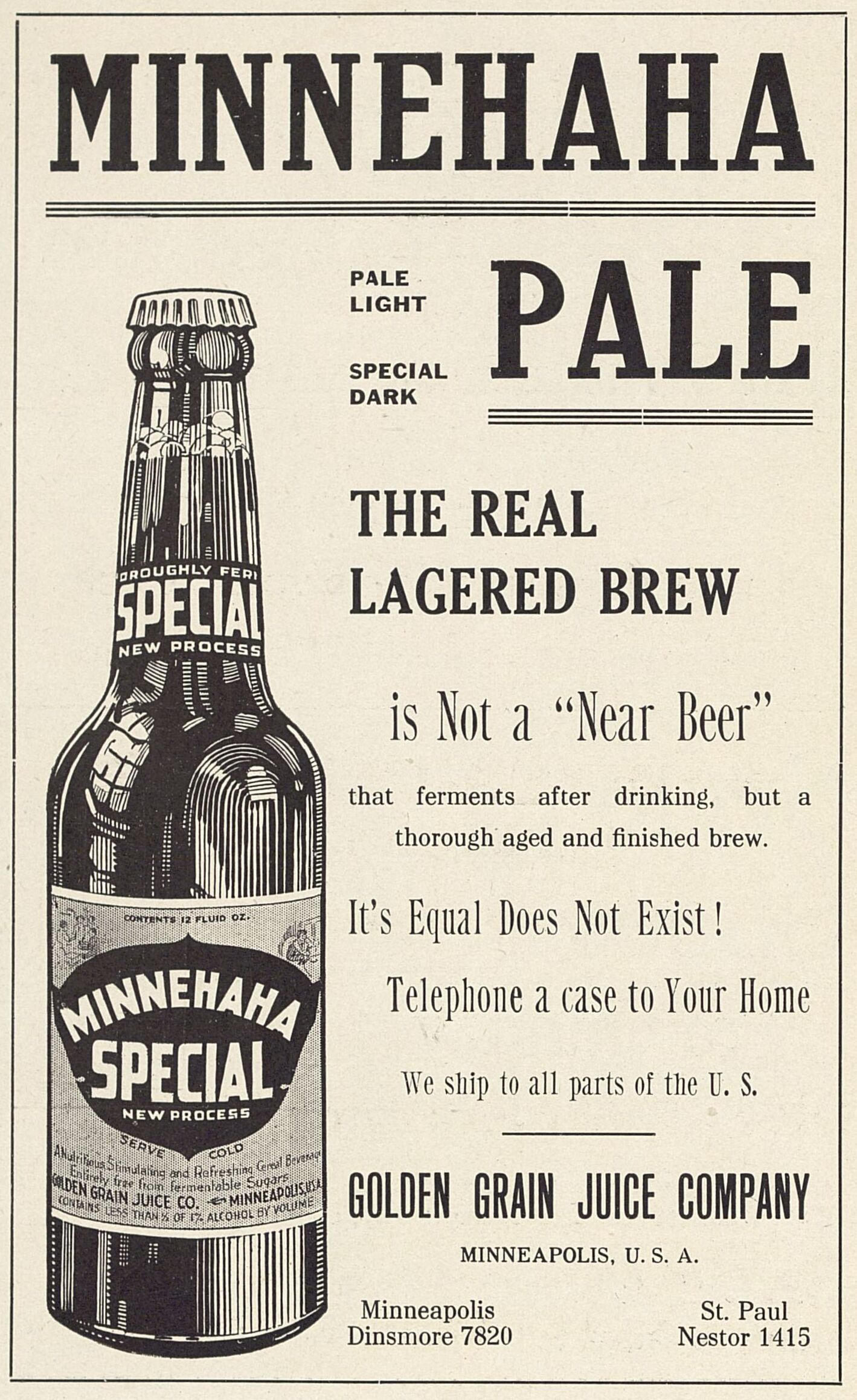
Advertisement for "Minnehaha Pale" and the Golden Grain Juice Company, from Goldenes Jubilaeum der St. Joseph's-Gemeinde von Nord-Minneapolis.

Grain Belt Golden, a traditional golden German-style lager, was popular, but Prohibition halted production from 1920 until 1933. The company temporarily changed its name to Golden Grain Juice Company and, like many other brewers, turned to making near beer and soft drinks until repeal of the Eighteenth Amendment to the US Constitution. Grain Belt Beer returned to taverns in October 1933 with bottled beer reappearing in December 1933.

World War II brought rationing, and the company briefly had to drop cans altogether and resort to using green glass in its bottles, rather than the standard amber color which offered better protection from light. Sale of beer in bottles and cans had become dominant over draft sales in drinking establishments, so the brewer experimented with all sorts of packaging innovations, expanding the line after the war ended. A premium beer, called Grain Belt Premium, entered production in 1947. Conetop cans sealed with caps disappeared in the 1950s in favor of flat-top steel cans.

=== Grain Belt Breweries ===
Minneapolis Brewing company officially changed its name to Grain Belt Breweries in 1967 after purchasing the Storz Brewing Company of Omaha, Nebraska, United States, which marketed Storz Beer and Storz Tap Beer in bottles, cans and draft. Grain Belt also took over the line of the New Ulm, Minnesota-based Hauenstein Brewery two years later. The company's main slogan — intoned by a deep male voice on TV ads — was, "Been a long time a-brewing." Eventually Grain Belt introduced a new beer called GBX Malt Liquor. For many years, the company also brewed Grain Belt Bock Beer for limited release in the spring. Grain Belt billboard signs could be seen on the scoreboard at Minnesota Vikings games and the beer was a popular choice in the stands at Minnesota Twins games. The label featured the image of a bubbling water fountain, which had been built on the park-like grounds of the brewery to tout the pure water used in the brewing process. Another ad slogan was, "From perfect brewing water...."

At the end of the 1960s, Grain Belt was the 18th-largest brewing company in the US, and a major force in the Midwest. Primary competitors up to this point had been local rivals, Theodore Hamm and Jacob Schmidt, both in St. Paul, Gluek Brewing Company, in Minneapolis, Cold Spring Brewing Company in Cold Spring, Minnesota and a few other regional brewers. Business began to decline as better-capitalized national brewing companies such as Anheuser-Busch, Schlitz and Miller began targeting the markets of regional brewers like Grain Belt. These companies swooped into markets, often advertising heavily, dropping prices and forcing regional brands like Grain Belt into the background since the smaller regional brewers were unable to match the big brewer's advertising and promotional budgets. In 1975, stockholders decided to sell the Grain Belt company to area businessman Irwin Jacobs, and operation ceased by the end of the year.

=== Decline ===
In 1976 the remains were sold to G. Heileman Brewing Company (based in La Crosse, Wisconsin), which closed Grain Belt Brewery and moved production to the former Jacob Schmidt brewery in St. Paul, Minnesota, which Heileman had purchased only a few years before. At the St. Paul facility, former rivals Grain Belt and Schmidt were brewed side by side with Heileman stablemates Old Style and Special Export for many years. Heileman also launched a low calorie version of Grain Belt called Grain Belt Light.

=== Changes ===
In 1989, G. Heileman, citing over-capacity, closed the St. Paul brewery and moved production of Grain Belt to its La Crosse, Wisconsin, brewery, taking production of the Grain Belt (and Schmidt) brands out of the Twin Cities for the first time. G. Heileman found itself faltering within a decade because of many of the same market pressures Grain Belt Breweries had faced in the 1970s. A group of investors was formed to purchase the Schmidt plant from Heileman. They also negotiated with Heileman to obtain the Schmidt brand, but Heileman declined to sell it. Instead, it offered the investors the rights to the Grain Belt brand. The investors accepted the counter offer, as it was a recognizable, established Twin Cities brand which it could market. The new company was called the Minnesota Brewing Company 1991. It thrived during the 1990s with sales peaking in 1996. Minnesota Brewing also performed extensive contract brewing for other beverage companies to improve efficiency and keep the plant operating closer to capacity.

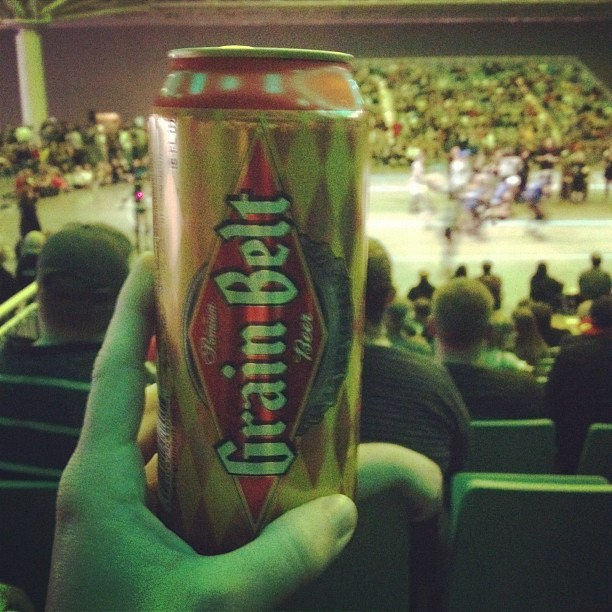
A Grain Belt beer can

==== New ownership ====
In 2001, the company launched a line of specialty craft beers under the "Brewer's Cave" and "Grain Belt Archive Series" brand names. These beers were high quality, all-malt products brewed without adjunct grains such as corn or rice. Most were highly hopped and very flavorful to appeal to the new breed of craft beer drinkers. Unfortunately, in a classic case of "too little, too late", these fine Grain Belt beers came a bit late to save the company, which was facing financial problems.

History repeated itself yet again, and by 2001 sales were off 50% from their 1996 highs. The company's debt deepened, and Minnesota Brewing filed for bankruptcy in February 2002. On June 24, 2002, the brewery's doors were closed. The Grain Belt brand was bought in August 2002 by a longtime rival Minnesota brewer, the August Schell Brewing Company of New Ulm. Schell's brews and packages Grain Belt Premium, Grain Belt Premium Light, Grain Belt Nordeast, and Grain Belt Lock & Dam, primarily for the Minnesota market. Grain Belt Premium has since become Schell's most popular brand, and has earned an especially strong following in the younger demographic of the region. On February 16, 2018, Schell's announced that it would be adding to the Grain Belt family by canning its Grain Belt BLU variety (previously a Minnesota State Fair and limited release variety). Starting in 2015, Grain Belt released limited-edition 12 packs featuring football-themed labels and bottle cap games.

== Architectural legacy ==
=== The former brewery ===
- Minneapolis Brewing Company
- U.S. National Register of Historic Places
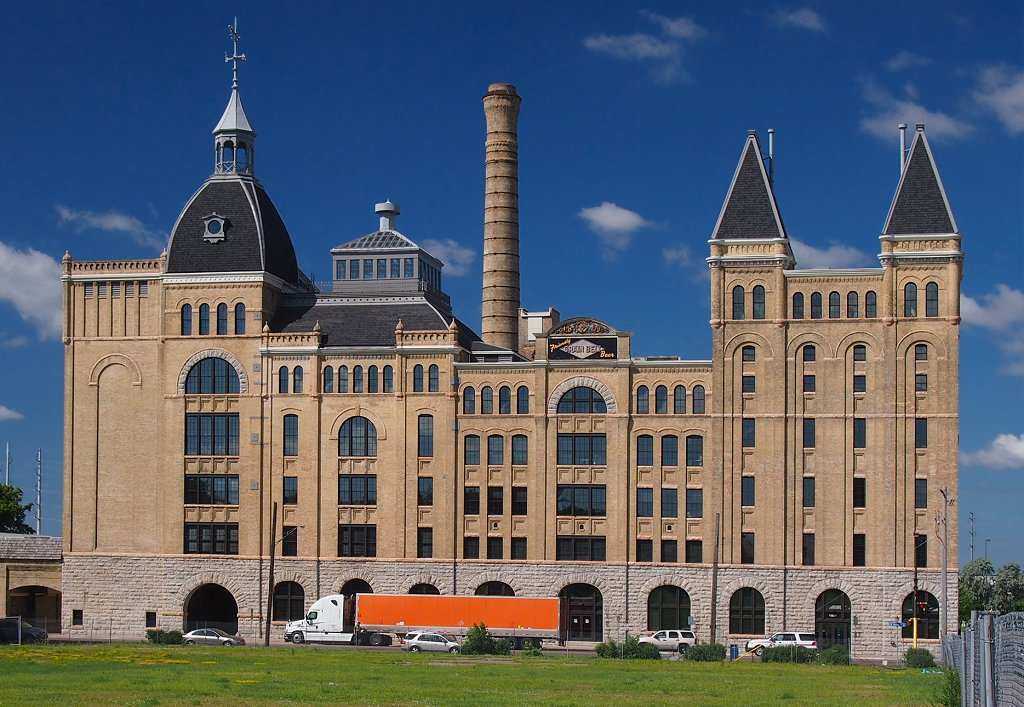
- The former brewery building in Northeast, Minneapolis
- Location: Jct. of Marshall St. and 13th Ave. NE. Minneapolis, Minnesota
- Coordinates: 45°0′0″N 93°16′13″W
- Architect: William L. Lehle; Frederick W. Wolff
- Architectural style: Romanesque
- NRHP reference No.: 90000988
- Added to NRHP: June 21, 1990

The former brewery building in Northeast, Minneapolis, located north of Broadway Street Northeast on the east bank of the Mississippi River, is listed in the National Register of Historic Places. It was renovated and redeveloped by Ryan Companies for multiple tenants. The contributing structures include the Brewhouse, currently the home of RSP Architects, which was designed by the architectural firm of Wolff and Lehle; the power station (Boiler House); the Wagon Shed and Shops (Gasthaus), which has become the Pierre Bottineau Branch of Hennepin County Library; the Grain Belt Office Building (designed by Carl F. Struck); the Bottling House, including the 1969 addition, which now serves as a space for artist studios; the 1910 Warehouse, including its 1949 and 1957 additions, but not its 1964 addition, which has been developed into office and light industrial space; and a railroad spur. The Keg House is also part of the complex, but not part of the Registered Historic Place entry. The renovation has won the National Preservation Award from the American Institute of Architects. The area forms an anchor to the Northeast Minneapolis Arts District, including many members of the Northeast Minneapolis Arts Association. The 1964 addition to the warehouse will be demolished as part of the development of Sheridan Memorial Park.

=== Sign on Nicollet Island ===
- Grain Belt Beer Sign
- U.S. National Register of Historic Places
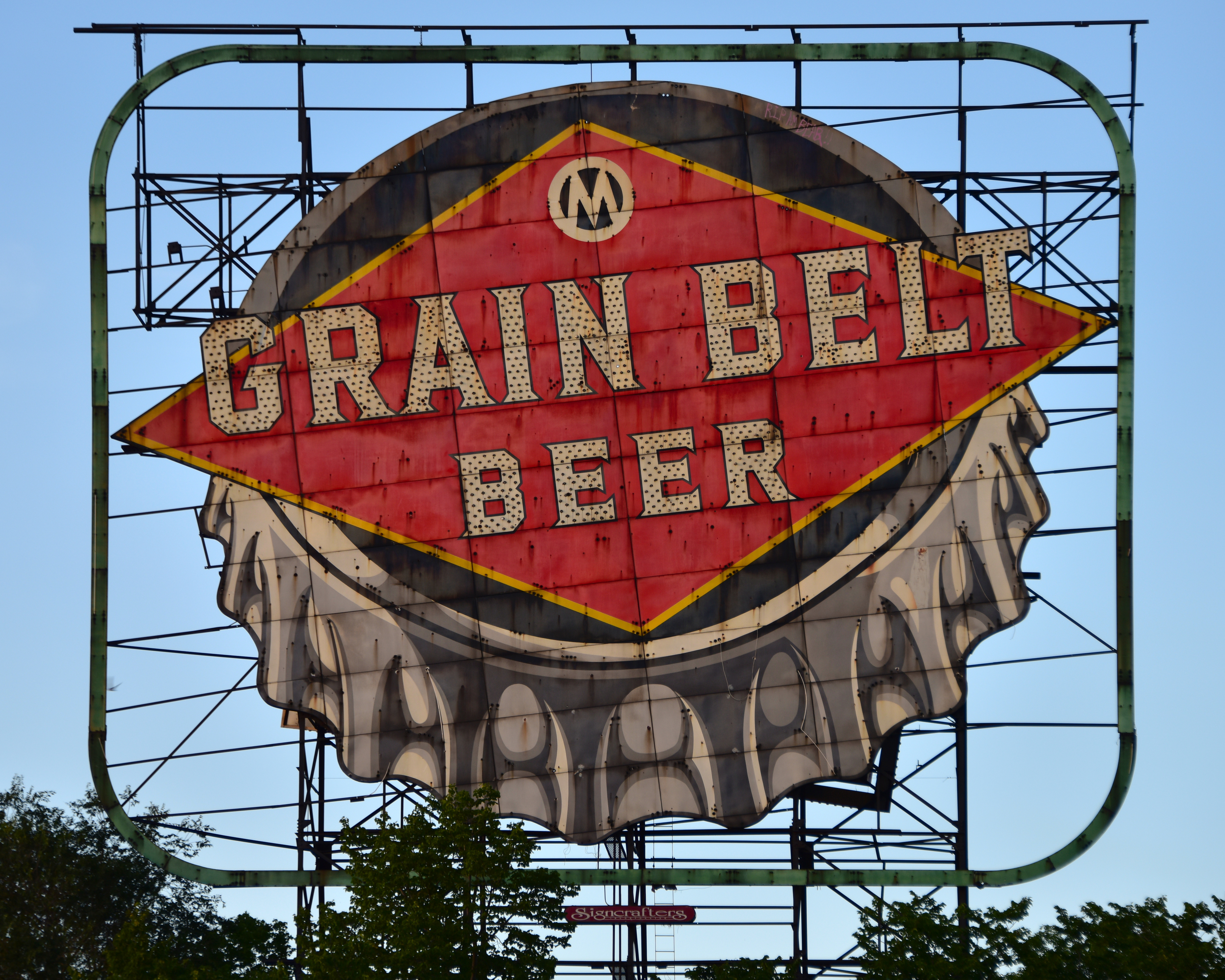
- Location: Nicollet Island
- Nearest city: Minneapolis
- Coordinates: 44°59′10″N 93°15′48″W
- Built: 1941
- NRHP reference No.: 16000511
- Added to NRHP: August 4, 2016

In 1941, a 48-foot-high sign with the Grain Belt logo, illuminated by a mix of neon tubes and incandescent bulbs, was placed on the roof of the Marigold Ballroom in downtown Minneapolis. In 1950, the sign was moved to Nicollet Island, next to the Hennepin Avenue Bridge, and an illuminated green frame added around the logo. The sign sits on Nicollet Island, an island in the Mississippi, and is part of the Saint Anthony Falls Historic District. The sign was listed on the National Register of Historic Places in 2016.

The sign's illumination failed sometime after 1966; it was restored in 1989 and the sign lit intermittently until 1996. On December 30, 2017, the sign was again relit following a 15-year restoration campaign and the replacement of all the neon tubes and incandescent bulbs with LEDs.

== Cultural references ==
- Brooklyn rock band The Hold Steady mentions the "Grain Belt Bridge" in their song "Party Pit" from the album Boys and Girls in America.
- Grain Belt Premium can be seen on the headstone of Marvin Erickson during the "Tailgate" episode of How I Met Your Mother.
- In the 1996 movie Fargo, Carl (Steve Buscemi) and Gaear (Peter Stormare) can be seen drinking Grain Belt while waiting for Jerry (William H. Macy).

In Garrison Keillor's novel: “WLT: A Radio Romance”, Grain Belt is announced by Frank White as a station sponsor.

== Additional resources ==
- The historical corporate records of Grain Belt Breweries are available for research use at the Minnesota Historical Society.

== See also ==
- List of defunct breweries in the United States
