= Hobe family =

German noble family

Coat of arms of von Hobe

The Hobe family (also: von Hobe von Gelting, Baron von Hobe-Gelting, Hobe Freiherr von Gelting or Monforts von Hobe) is the name of an old German noble family from Mecklenburg, which also became influential in Denmark. Branches of the family are still in existence today.

== History ==
19th century scholars assumed that the Hobe family came to Mecklenburg from Pomerania, but before that came from the Lower Rhine. It was there that the knight Hermannus dictus Hůbe scabinus in Willich appears in a record in 1272. In 1283 a knight named Hobe is mentioned as a witness for Kolbatz Abbey, one Hobo in 1284 in the town of Greifswald, Reimbertus Hobe is a witness for a deed of the monastery of Verchen in 1287, and his possible brother the knight Johannes Hobe was a witness for the town of Demmin 1292. The son of the latter, Johannes Hobe, owned half of Cavelsdorf in 1324–1325 in the Principality of Rügen. His descendants were still in possession of the fief of Beestland in the bailiwick of Loitz in 1524. The counter-argument, that the Hobe family moved early from Mecklenburg to Pomerania, also had its supporters.

According to more recent scholarship, the Hobe family is first mentioned with the knight Johannes Hobe on 20 May 1278. In 1376 the squire Henningk Hobe was witness to a deed. With Dietrich (Tiedeke) Hobe the Black (died 1379), lord at Wasdow, the family line begins for certain. Barthold Hobe and Lütke Hoben signed the Union of Mecklenburg Knights in 1523 for the family. Friedrich von Hobe was a Geheimer Rat and chamber president to Gustav Adolph, Duke of Mecklenburg-Güstrow.

On 29 February 1776 the royal Danish General of Infantry Lewin Ludwig von Hobe (1700–1781) received Danish noble naturalisation. (Note: note See Lewin Ludwig von Hobe in the Danish Wikipedia) The nephew and adopted son Christian Friedrich Rudolph Baron af Gelting, Lewin Ludwig Christian Leopold von Hobe, Danish Rittmeister, was raised into the Danish rank of Freiherren under the name of "Hobe von Gelting" on 19 October 1821, with a diploma on 14 May 1828, linked to the property of the Gelting barony. His Freiherr rank was confirmed in Prussia.

Many officers in the Prussian army came from the family. A von Hobe was commander of the Hussar Regiment (Nr. 3) from 1811 to 1813. In the Napoleonic Wars, August Johann von Hobe, and Karl Friedrich von Hobe, both distinguished themselves and were awarded the Pour le Mérite (in 1813 and 1814 respectively). Four family members made it to the rank of lieutenant general.

The monastery of Dobbertin has 17 entries concerning daughters of the von Hobe families from Behrenshagen, Methling, Warbelow, Gutendorff, Goldebee and Jürgenstorff in the years 1725–1839, who entered the aristocratic Frauenstift there. Through the military service of their fathers, several Mecklenburg daughters were born in Merseburg, Eisleben and Neustadt an der Aisch. The grave stone of the prioress Melanie von Hobe lies at the graveyard of Dobbertin.

The merchant, farmer and forester as well as Knight of the Sovereign Military Order of Malta, Johann Caspar Melchior Balthasar Herbert Hubertus Siegfried von Hobe (1915–2001), was the adopted son of his uncle Joseph Monforts, and as such took the name "Monforts von Hobe" from 1 October 1941. This line still exists today. There is no connection to the South German counts of Montfort.

== Possession ==
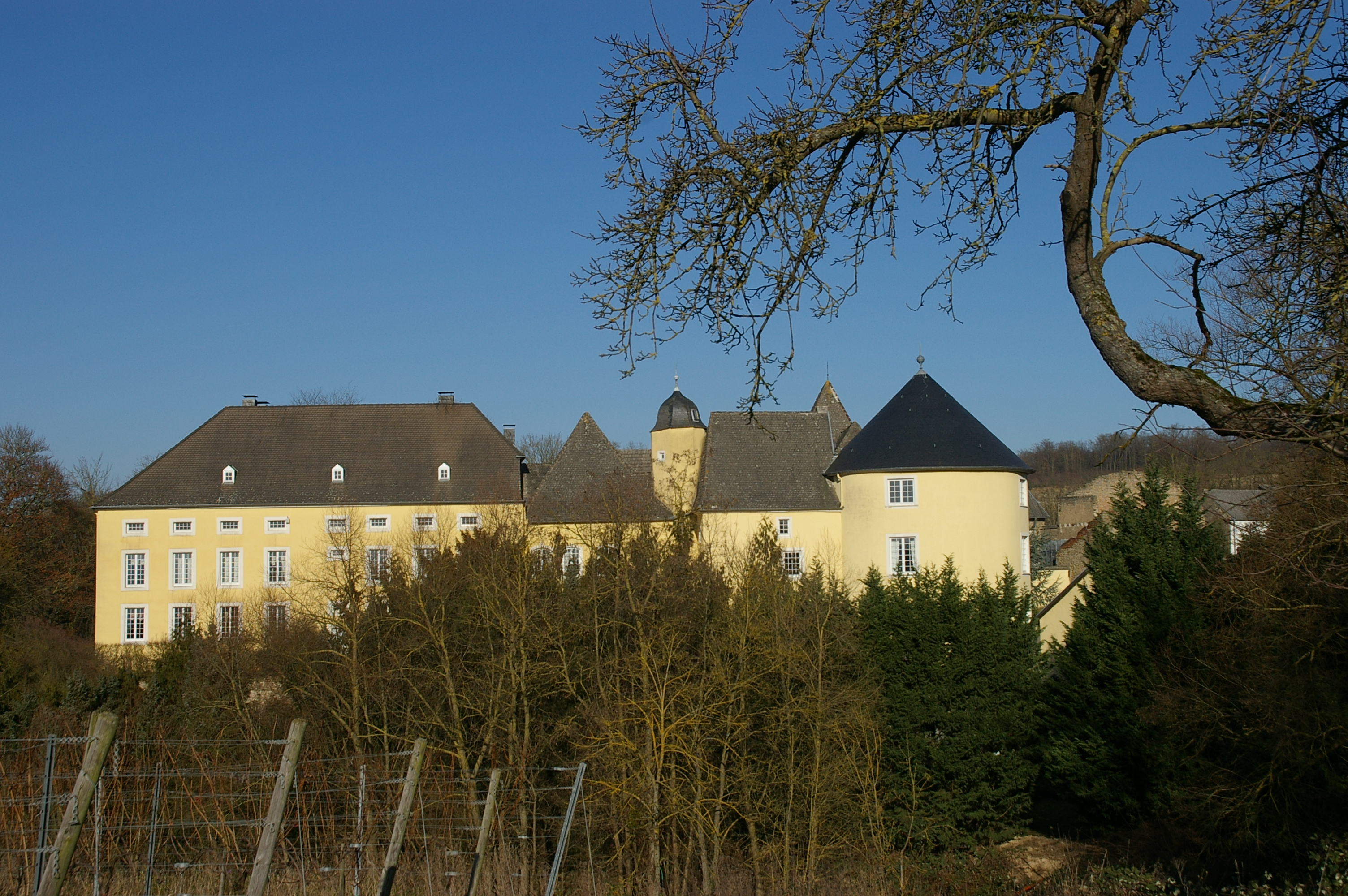
Schloss Thorn.

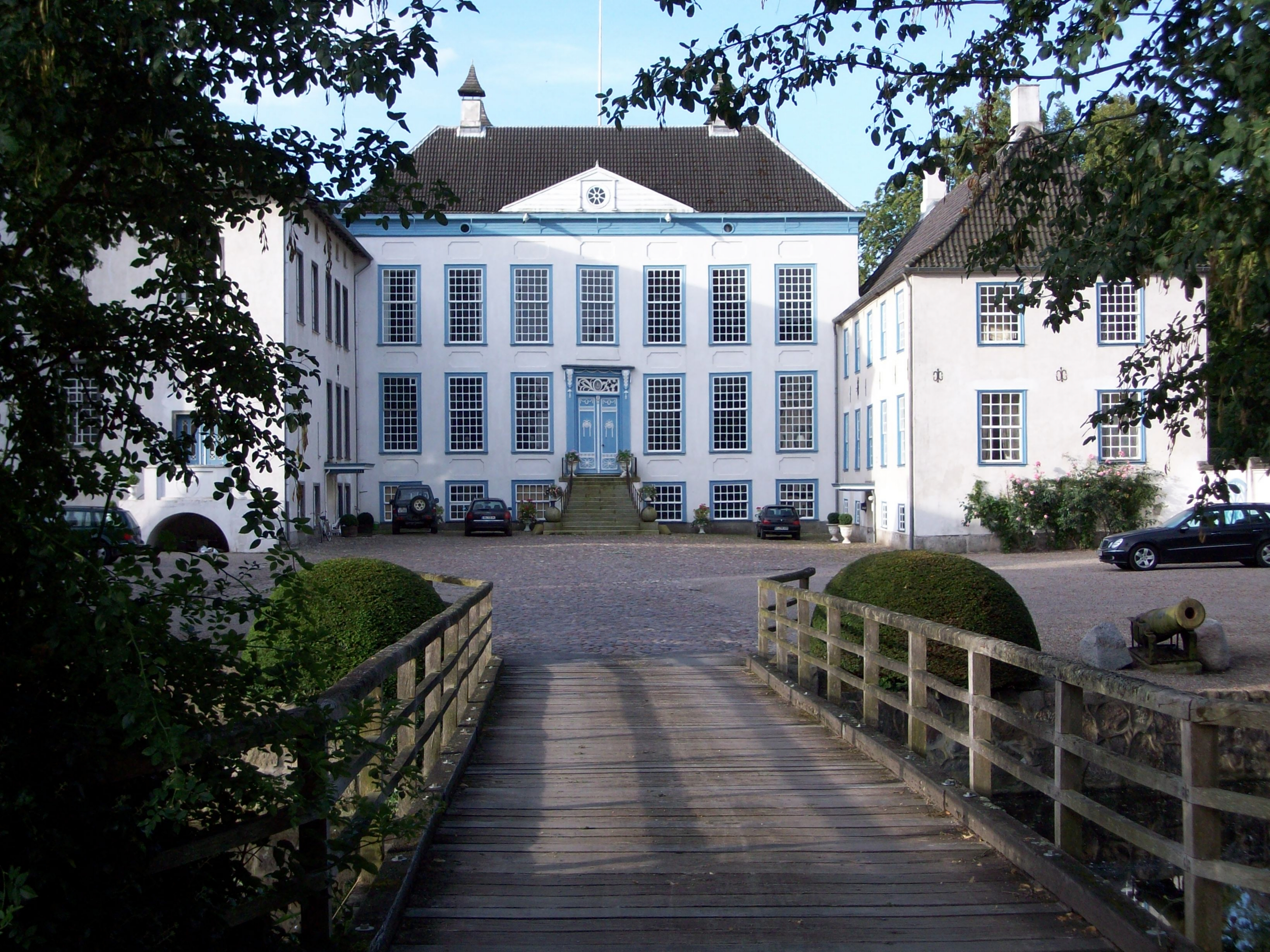
Schloss Gelting.

The historical possessions of the family are as follows:

- In Brandenburg: Dyrotz
- In Magdeburg: Tucheim
- In Mecklenburg: Berendshagen with Pustohl, Bobbin, Carlowitz, Gardow, Klein Gischow, Glockow, Goldebee, Guthendorf, Jürgenstorf, Lockwisch, Groß Lunow, Klein Methling, Neuhof bei Güstrow, Nieköhr, Quitzenow, Klein Tessin, Warbelow, Wasdow, Wendisch Trechow und Wolkow
- In Pomerania: Beestland and Ventzewitz at Rügen
- In Schleswig-Holstein: Gelting as well as Ohrfeld

In Neustrelitz, opposite the Landestheater is the Weiße Herrenhaus, or the Hobe-Haus, named after the family

Currently, the family owns Schloss Thorn − with the oldest castle vineyard on the Moselle − as well as Gelting and Depenau in Schleswig-Holstein
