= Dania Hall (Racine, Wisconsin) =

Coordinates: 42°43′53.0″N 87°47′33.0″W

General information
- Architectural style: Neoclassical
- Location: 1019 State Street; Racine, Wisconsin
- Completed: 1876

Design and construction
- Architect(s): Chandler and Park

Dania Hall was a historic gathering place for people of Danish heritage in Racine, Wisconsin. Located at 1019 State Street, it was built by Society Dania, an organization formed in 1867 to aid Danish immigrants in learning language and customs. The structure, completed in 1876, featured a large meeting room, where there were dinners, dances and performances by the Singing Society and Dania Dramatic Club. In the early years the facility also had a Danish school and library. In 1976 it was the site of a reception for Queen Margrethe II of Denmark, and Prince Henrik.

There were Dania Halls in other parts of the country, including Hudson, Wisconsin; Minneapolis, Minnesota; Livermore, California and Modesto, California.
