= Saint Anthony Main =

Commercial area in Minneapolis, Minnesota

Coordinates: 44°59′05″N 93°15′20″W

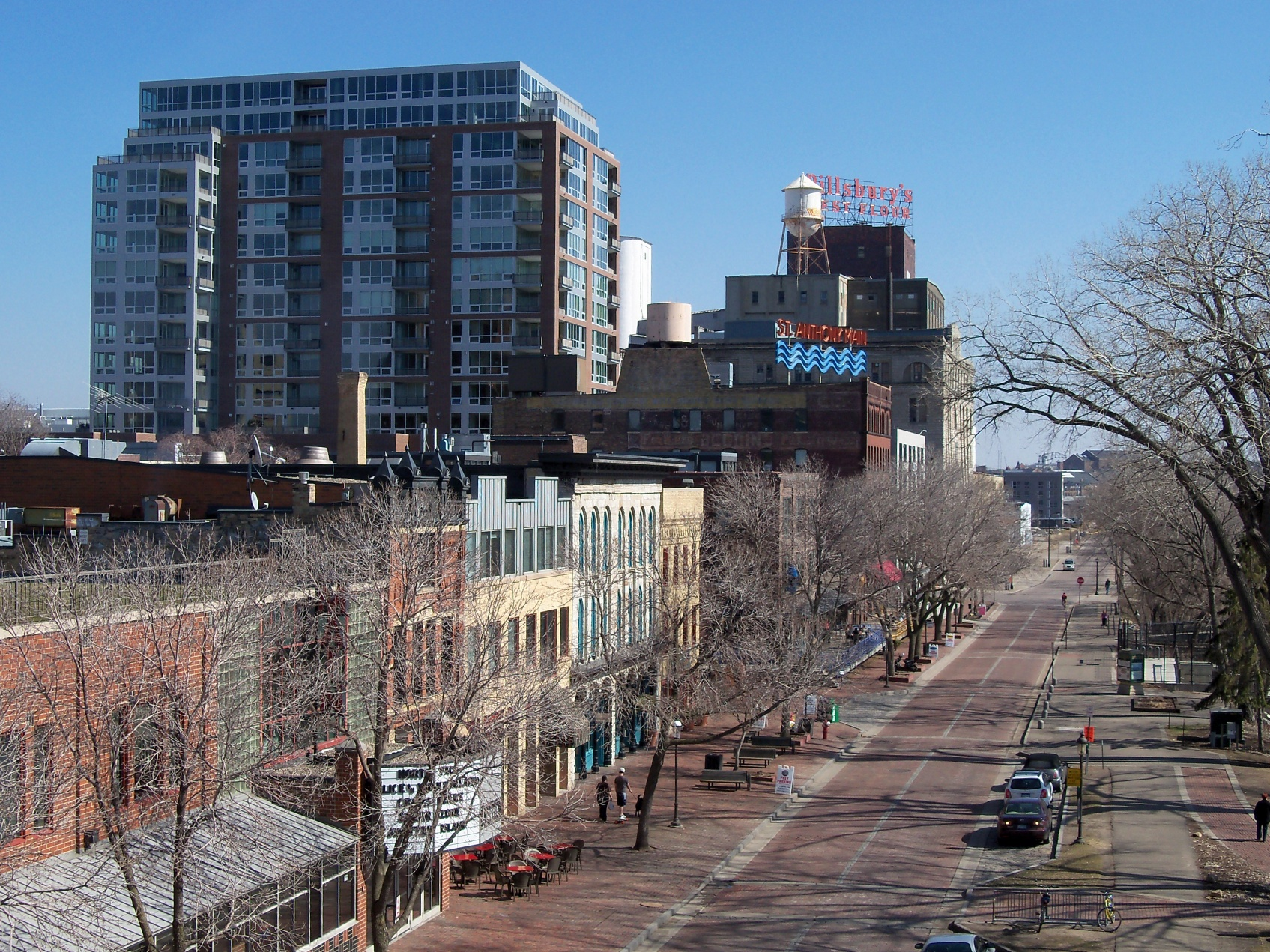
Saint Anthony Main, in front of the Pillsbury "A" Mill.

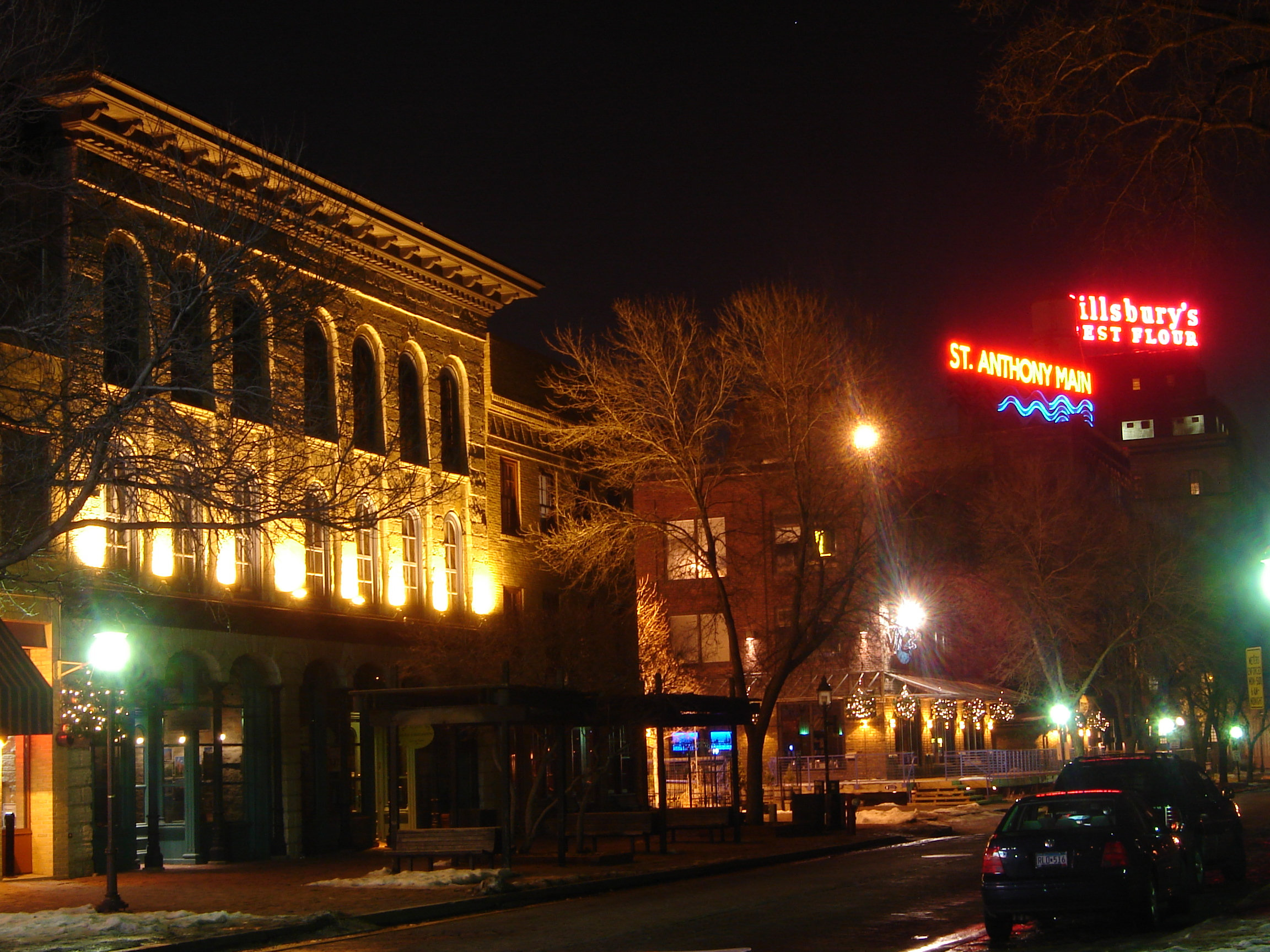
Saint Anthony Main at night

Saint Anthony Main is a stretch of buildings on Main Street across from Saint Anthony Falls in the Marcy-Holmes and Nicollet Island/East Bank neighborhoods of Minneapolis. The area is part of Southeast, Minneapolis, as it was originally the Main Street through the township of St. Anthony, Minnesota prior to most of that township's annexation in 1872. It opened as a festival marketplace in the 1980s.

In 1968, Architect Peter Nelson Hall purchased Pracna, which at the time was a machine shop, revitalized it back into a restaurant, and brought a focus in Minneapolis back to the Riverfront. This started a revitalization movement on Main Street.

The area underwent a resurgence during the condominium boom in the early 2000s with several condo projects built in and around the area. It is now home to a movie theater, four bars and restaurants, a small cafe, design firms, and a Segway tour operator.

== Buildings and sights ==
Saint Anthony Main sits on the other side of Central Avenue from Riverplace, a housing and office complex. It fronts the river at Saint Anthony Falls, the only waterfall on the Mississippi River, and sits across from the Main Street Station, host of the Water Power Park, which opened in Spring 2007.

Some of the buildings in the area date from the 1850s when the Village of Saint Anthony on the northeast side of the Mississippi River was still separate from Minneapolis itself. Several are contributing properties to the Saint Anthony Falls Historic District:

- Pracna Building, 117 Main Street SE (1890, now Pracna on Main)
- Salisbury & Satterlee Company Complex, 201-205 and 219 Main Street SE (1885, now Vic's Dining and Tuggs)
- Upton Block/ Union Iron Works, 129 Main Street SE (1855)
- Martin and Morrison Block, 127-129 Main Street SE (1858)

There are newer buildings in the area such as Phoenix on the River and the Mill and Main apartments and the Stone Arch Apartments complexes. The Pillsbury A-Mill was renovated and converted into new apartments including the A-Mill Artist lofts.
