= 1910 in music =

This is a list of notable events in music that took place in the year 1910.

== Specific locations ==
- 1910 in Norwegian music

== Specific genres ==
- 1910 in jazz

== Events ==
- February 19 - English premiere of Richard Strauss's opera Elektra, Thomas Beecham conducting at the first-ever performance of a Strauss opera in the UK at the Royal Opera House, London
- March 19 – Béla Bartók's String Quartet No. 1 is premiered in Budapest
- June 25 – Igor Stravinsky's ballet, The Firebird, is premiered in Paris
- September 12 – Gustav Mahler's Symphony No. 8, the Symphony of a Thousand, is premiered in Munich under his baton.
- October – Pietro Mascagni and Giacomo Puccini make up after their 1905 quarrel
- November – John Lomax's pioneering collection Cowboy Songs and Other Frontier Ballads is published by Sturgis and Walton in the United States with an introduction by Theodore Roosevelt
- November 7 – The musical comedy, Naughty Marietta, with music by Victor Herbert, is first performed on Broadway
- November 10 – Edward Elgar conducts the premiere of his Violin Concerto, with Fritz Kreisler playing the solo part
- Mary Garden begins her 20-year reign as soprano of the Chicago Civic Opera

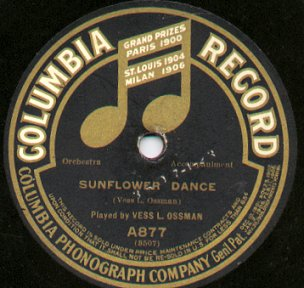
Ragtime banjo by Vess L. Ossman Columbia Records, 1910

== Published popular music ==
- "Ah! Sweet Mystery Of Life" w. Rita Johnson Young m. Victor Herbert. From the operetta Naughty Marietta
- "Alexander and His Clarinet" w. Irving Berlin m. Ted Snyder
- "All Aboard For Blanket Bay" w. Andrew B. Sterling m. Harry Von Tilzer
- "Any Little Girl, That's a Nice Little Girl, is the Right Little Girl For Me" w. Thomas J. Gray m. Fred Fisher
- "Back To My Old Home Town" w.m. Nora Bayes & Jack Norworth
- "A Banjo Song" by Howard Weeden
- "The Big Bass Viol" w.m. M. T. Bohannon
- "The Birth of Passion" w. Otto Harbach m. Karl Hoschna. From the musical Madame Sherry.
- "Bring Back My Lena To Me" w.m. Irving Berlin & David Andrew Noll
- "By The Saskatchewan" w. C. M. S. McLellan m. Ivan Caryll
- "Call Me Up Some Rainy Afternoon" w.m. Irving Berlin
- "Caprice Viennois" m. Fritz Kreisler
- "The Chanticleer Rag" w. Edward Madden m. Albert Gumble
- "The Chicken Reel" m. Joseph M. Daly
- "Chinatown, My Chinatown" w. William Jerome m. Jean Schwartz
- "Cloud-Chief" m. J. Ernest Philie.
- "Come Josephine In My Flying Machine" w. Alfred Bryan m. Fred Fisher
- "Come To The Ball" w. Adrian Ross m. Lionel Monckton
- "The Convict And The Bird" w.m. T. W. Connor
- "Day Dreams, Visions Of Bliss" w. Harry B. Smith & Robert B. Smith m. Heinrich Reinhardt
- "Dear Mayme, I Love You!" Irving Berlin and Ted Snyder
- "Doctor Tinkle Tinker" by Otto Harbach
- "Down By The Old Mill Stream" w.m. Tell Taylor
- "Dream of a Miner's Child" ("Don't Go down in the Mine, Dad") w. Robert Donnely, Will Geddes
- "Dreams, Just Dreams" Irving Berlin & Ted Snyder
- "Every Little Movement" w. Otto Harbach m. Karl Hoschna
- "Grizzly Bear" w.m. George Botsford & Irving Berlin
- "Gee, But It’s Great to Meet a Friend From Your Home" w.m. William Tracey & James McGavisk
- "Herman Let's Dance That Beautiful Waltz" Irving Berlin & Ted Snyder
- "How Can You Love Such A Man?" Irving Berlin
- "I Feel So Lonely" w.m. Bert Lee. Introduced by Fred Allandale in the musical The Islander (musical)
- "If He Comes In I'm Going Out" w. Cecil Mack m. Chris Smith
- "If I Was A Millionaire" w. Will D. Cobb m. Gus Edwards
- "I'm Falling In Love With Someone" w. Rida Johnson Young m. Victor Herbert
- "I'm Henery the Eighth" w.m. Fred Murray & R. P. Weston
- "In The Shadows" w. E. Ray Goetz m. Herman Finck
- "Is There Anything Else I Can Do For You?" w.m. Irving Berlin & Ted Snyder
- "Italian Street Song" w. Rida Johnson Young m. Victor Herbert
- "I've Got The Time I've Got The Place But It's Hard To Find The Girl" w. Ballard MacDonald m. S. R. Henry
- "Joshua" w.m George Arthurs & Bert Lee
- "Kiss Me, My Honey, Kiss Me" w. Irving Berlin m. Ted Snyder
- "Let Me Call You Sweetheart" w. Beth Slater Whitson m. Leo Friedman
- "Let Me Live And Stay In Dixieland" w.m. Elizabeth Brice & Charles King
- "Liebesfreud" m. Fritz Kreisler
- "Liebeslied" m. Fritz Kreisler
- "Life Is Only What You Make It After All" w. Edgar Smith m. A. Baldwin Sloane
- "Macushla" w. Josephine V. Rowe m. Dermot MacMurrough

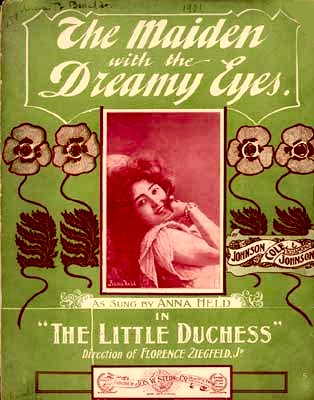
"The Maiden with the Dreamy Eyes", with photo of Anna Held, from Library of Congress

- "Maiden with the Dreamy Eyes" w. J. W. Johnson m. Bob Cole
- "Morning" w. Frank Lebby Stanton m. Oley Speaks
- "Mother Machree" w. Rida Johnson Young m. Ernest R. Ball & Chauncey Olcott
- "'Neath The Southern Moon" w. Rida Johnson Young m. Victor Herbert. From the operetta Naughty Marietta.
- "Nora Malone" w. Junie McCree m. Albert Von Tilzer
- "Oh How That German Could Love" w.m. Irving Berlin & Ted Snyder
- "Oh That Beautiful Rag" w. Irving Berlin m. Ted Snyder
- "On Mobile Bay" w. Earl C. Jones m. Neil Moret
- "A Perfect Day" w.m. Carrie Jacobs-Bond
- "Plant A Watermelon On My Grave And Let The Juice Soak Through" w.m. Frank Dumont & R. P. Lilly
- "Play That Barbershop Chord" w. Ballard MacDonald & William Tracey m. Lewis F. Muir
- "Put Your Arms Around Me Honey" w. Junie McCree m. Harry Von Tilzer
- "Silver Bell" w. Edward Madden m. Percy Wenrich
- "Silver Star" m. Charles L. Johnson
- "Some Of These Days" w.m. Shelton Brooks

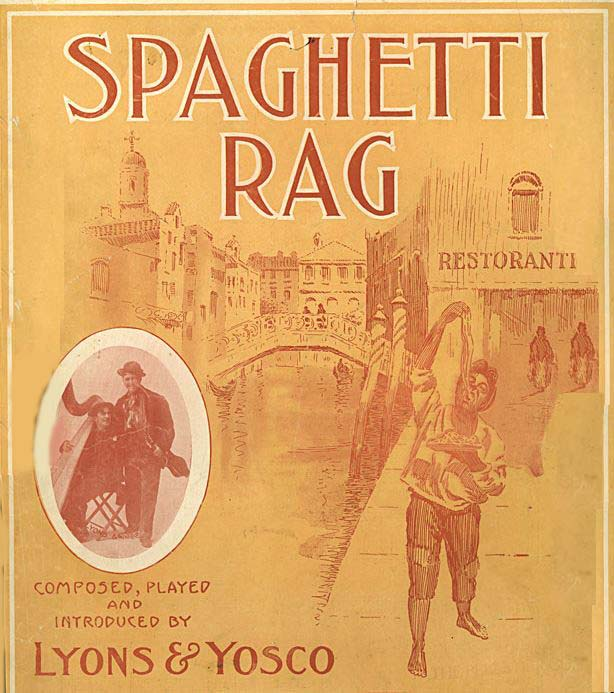
Cover of sheet music "Spaghetti Rag" by Lyons and Yosco

- "Spaghetti Rag" m. George Lyons & Bob Yosco
- "Steamboat Bill" w. Ren Shields m. Bert Leighton & Frank Leighton
- "Stein Song (Maine)" w. Lincoln Colcord m. E. A. Fenstad
- "Stop, Stop, Stop (Come Over And Love Me Some More)" w.m. Irving Berlin
- "Sweet Italian Love" Irving Berlin, Ted Snyder
- "Tambourin Chinois" m. Fritz Kreisler
- "Telling Lies" Irving Berlin, Henrietta Blanke-Belcher
- "That Minor Strain" w. Cecil Mack m. Ford Dabney
- "That Opera Rag" Irving Berlin, Ted Snyder
- "That's Why They Call Me "Shine"" w. Cecil Mack m. Ford Dabney
- "Tramp! Tramp! Tramp!" w. Rida Johnson Young m. Victor Herbert
- "Two Little Love Bees" w. Harry B. Smith & Robert B. Smith m. Heinrich Reinhardt
- "Under The Yum Yum Tree" w. Andrew B. Sterling m. Harry Von Tilzer
- "Vissi D'Arte" Giacossa, Illica, Puccini
- "What's The Matter With Father?" w. Harry H. Williams m. Egbert Van Alstyne
- "Who Are You With Tonight?" w. Harry Williams m. Egbert Van Alstyne

== Hit recordings ==
- "Come Josephine In My Flying Machine" – Blanche Ring

== Classical music ==
- Alban Berg - String Quartet, Op. 3
- Rutland Boughton – Five Celtic Songs
- Claude Debussy - Préludes (book 1 begun in 1910)
- Edward Elgar -
  - Violin Concerto, Op. 61
  - Romance for bassoon, Op. 62
- Victor Ewald – Symphony for Brass
- Gabriel Fauré – 9 Préludes, Op. 103 (completed in this year)
- Charles Ives - Symphony No. 3 (1908-1910)
- Gustav Mahler – Symphony No. 9
- Erkki Melartin – String Quartet No. 4
- Nikolai Myaskovsky –
  - Symphonic poem Silence
  - String Quartet No. 3 (original version)
- Carl Nielsen –
  - At the Bier of a Young Artist (orchestral work for funeral)
  - Paaske-Liljen (choral work)
  - Sinfonia espansiva, Op. 27 / FS 60 (begun, concluded 1911)
- Sergei Rachmaninoff
  - Liturgy of St John Chrysostom, Op. 31
  - 13 Preludes, Op. 32
- Arnold Schoenberg – Five Pieces for Orchestra
- Alexander Scriabin – Prometheus, "The Poem of Fire"
- Jean Sibelius - In Memoriam, Op. 59 (completed)
- Igor Stravinsky – The Firebird
- Ralph Vaughan Williams
  - Fantasia on a Theme by Thomas Tallis (first version)
  - Symphony No. 1 ("A Sea Symphony")
- Anton Webern – Four Pieces for violin and piano, Op. 7

=== Incidental music ===
- Carl Nielsen - Hagbarth og Signe

=== Opera ===
- Gialdino Gialdini – La Bufera premiered November 26 at the Politeama Ciscutti, Pola
- Jules Massenet – Don Quichotte premiered February 19 in Monte Carlo, starring Feodor Chaliapin
- Giacomo Puccini – La fanciulla del West (The Girl of the West), libretto by Guelfo Civinini and Carlo Zangarini, first performed in at the Metropolitan Opera, New York City
- Alexander Zemlinsky – Kleider machen Leute

=== Ballet ===
- June 25 – Igor Stravinsky's ballet, The Firebird, is premiered in Paris

== Musical theatre ==
"How can they tell that I'm Irish?"
A 1910 Edison Records recording of vaudeville performer Edward M. Favor's rendition of C. W. Murphy's song

- The Balkan Princess London production opened at the Prince of Wales Theatre on February 19 and ran for 176 performances
- The Chocolate Soldier (Rudolf Friml) – London production opened at the Lyric Theatre on September 10 and ran for 500 performances
- The Islander London production opened at the Apollo Theatre on April 23 and ran for 114 performances
- The Jolly Bachelors Broadway production opened at the Broadway Theatre on January 6 and ran for 165 performances
- Die keusche Susanne (m. Jean Gilbert) opened in Magdeburg
- Madame Sherry Broadway production opened at the New Amsterdam Theatre on August 30 and ran for 231 performances
- Naughty Marietta (Rida Johnson Young and Victor Herbert) – Broadway production opened at the New York Theatre on November 7 and ran for 136 performances
- Our Miss Gibbs Broadway production opened at the Knickerbocker Theatre on August 29 and ran for 64 performances
- The Quaker Girl (Music: Lionel Monckton Lyrics: Adrian Ross & Percy Greenbank Book: James T. Tanner). London production opened at the Adelphi Theatre on November 5 and ran for 536 performances. Starring Gertie Millar, Joseph Coyne and C. Hayden Coffin.
- The Satyr London production
- Tillie's Nightmare Broadway production opened at the Herald Square Theatre on May 5 and was revived at the Manhattan Opera House on December 18, 1911, for a total run of 85 performances
- Up and Down Broadway Broadway revue opened at the Casino Theatre on July 18 and ran for 72 performances
- The Yankee Girl Broadway production opened at the Herald Square Theatre on February 10 and ran for 92 performances
- Zigeunerliebe Vienna production opened at the Carltheater on January 8

== Births ==
- January 1 – Koesbini, Indonesian composer (d. 1991)
- January 8 – Fabian Andre, composer (d. 1960)
- January 17 – Sid Catlett, American jazz drummer (d. 1951)
- January 23 – Django Reinhardt, Romani-French guitarist (d. 1953)
- February 3 – Blas Galindo, Mexican composer (d. 1993)
- February 10 – Sofia Vembo, Greek singer and actress (d. 1978)
- February 13 – Elsa Barraine, French composer (d. 1999)
- February 25 – Winifred Shaw, American actress, singer and dancer (d. 1982)
- March 9 – Samuel Barber, composer (d. 1981)
- March 11 – Nicola Salerno, Italian lyricist (d. 1969)
- March 15 – Anna-Lisa Björling, operatic soprano (d. 2006)
- March 25 – Magda Olivero, Italian soprano (d. 2014)
- March 27 – Manfred Bukofzer, German-American musicologist (d. 1955)
- April 14 – Werner Wolf Glaser, Swiss composer (d. 2006)
- April 26 – Erland von Koch, Swedish composer (d. 2009)
- April 30 – Levi Celerio, songwriter (d. 2002)
- May 8 – Mary Lou Williams, US jazz pianist and composer (d. 1981)
- May 12
  - Gordon Jenkins, US songwriter, conductor and pianist (d. 1984)
  - Giulietta Simionato, Italian mezzo-soprano (d. 2010)
- May 13 – Cleavant Derricks, gospel songwriter (d. 1977)
- May 23
  - Artie Shaw, US bandleader (d. 2004)
  - Scatman Crothers, American actor, singer, dancer and musician (d. 1986)
- May 26 – Lola Gjoka, Albanian pianist (d. 1985)
- May 28 – T-Bone Walker, blues musician (d. 1975)
- June 4 – Anton Dermota, operatic tenor (d. 1989)
- June 10 – Howlin' Wolf, blues singer and musician (d. 1976)
- June 15 – Alf Pearson, British singer, part of Bob and Alf Pearson (d. 2012)
- June 17 – H. Owen Reed, conductor and composer (d. 2014)
- June 18
  - Ray McKinley, US drummer, singer and bandleader (d. 1995)
  - Takahashi Chikuzan, Japanese musician and composer (d. 1998)
- June 22 – Anne Ziegler, English soprano (d. 2003)
- June 29 – Frank Loesser, US songwriter (d. 1969)
- July 10 – Achim Stoia, Romanian composer and conductor (d.1973)
- July 10 – Rafael Cepeda, folk musician (d. 1996)
- July 15 – Ronald Binge, British composer (d.1973)
- July 18 – Lou Busch, US arranger and composer a.k.a. Joe "Fingers" Carr (died 1979)
- August 1 – Walter Scharf, film composer (died 2003)
- August 7 – Freddie Slack, US pianist, composer and bandleader (d. 1965)
- August 12 – Heinrich Sutermeister, Swiss composer (d. 1995)
- August 17 – Erkki Aaltonen, composer (d. 1990)
- August 24 – Tunde King, Nigerian singer and instrumentalist, originator of Jùjú music (d. c.1980)
- August 25 – Ethel Stark, violinist and composer (d. 2012)
- September 3 – Kitty Carlisle, US actress and singer (d. 2007)
- September 12 – Shep Fields, bandleader (d. 1981)
- September 29 – Virginia Bruce, actress and singer (d. 1982)
- October 1 – André Dumortier, pianist (d. 2004)
- October 13 – Otto Joachim, composer (d. 2010)
- December 4 – Alex North, film composer (d. 1991)
- December 7 – Louis Prima, musician, singer (d. 1978)
- December 10 – John H. Hammond, record producer (d. 1987)

== Deaths ==
- January 19 – Otakar Hostinský, musicologist (b. 1847)
- March 10 – Carl Reinecke, composer, pianist and teacher (b. 1824)
- March 17 – Joaquín Valverde Durán, flautist, conductor and composer (b. 1846)
- March 28 – Édouard Colonne, violinist and conductor (b. 1838)
- May 3 – Lottie Collins, singer and dancer (b. 1865)
- May 7 – Bernhard Cossmann, cellist (b. 1822)
- May 18
  - Pauline Viardot, mezzo-soprano and composer (b. 1821)
  - Flor van Duyse, Belgian composer and musicologist (b. 1843)
- May 29 – Mily Balakirev, composer (b. 1837)
- June 6 – Concepció Bordalba, opera singer (b. 1866)
- July 4 – Louis-Albert Bourgault-Ducoudray, pianist and composer (b. 1840)
- July 7 – Emilio Usiglio, conductor and composer (b. 1841)
- July 14 – Marius Petipa, ballet dancer and choreographer (b. 1818)
- August 31 – Emīls Dārziņš, composer, conductor and music critic (b. 1875) (probable suicide)
- September 5
  - Julian Edwards, composer (b. 1855)
  - Franz Xaver Haberl, musicologist (b. 1840)
- September 24 – Rudolf Dellinger, composer (b. 1857)
- October 14 – Georges Mathias, composer and pianist (b. 1826)
- October 17 – Julia Ward Howe, lyricist of "The Battle Hymn of the Republic" (b. 1819)
- November 25 – John Henry Martin, Band instrument manufacturer (b. 1835)
- date unknown – Albert Schatz, composer and librettist (b. 1839)
