= Titanic: Music from the Motion Picture =

Soundtrack album by James Horner
- Released: November 18, 1997
- Recorded: 1996–1997
- Length: 72:31
- Label: Sony Classical/Sony Music Soundtracks

Singles from Titanic: Music from the Motion Picture
- 1. "My Heart Will Go On" Released: November 24, 1997

Professional ratings
Review scores
Source	Rating
AllMusic	4/5 stars
Film Score Reviews	5/5 stars
Filmtracks	5/5 stars
Movie Wave	3/5 stars

Titanic: Music from the Motion Picture is the soundtrack to the film of the same name composed, orchestrated, and conducted by James Horner and performed by the Hollywood Studio Symphony. The soundtrack was released by Sony Classical/Sony Music Soundtrax on November 18, 1997.

Riding the wave of the film's immense success, the soundtrack shot to the top of the charts in nearly two-dozen territories, selling over 32 million copies worldwide, making it one of the top 100 best-selling albums in the United States, one of the best-selling albums of all time, and the highest-selling primarily orchestral soundtrack of all time.

In 2012, the album, along with its successor Back to Titanic (1998), was reissued as part of the Collector's Anniversary Edition set for the 3D re-release of the film. In 2017, La-La Land Records released the 20th Anniversary Edition in a limited edition 4-disc release.

In 2022, on the film's 25th anniversary, the album was released on LP in a limited edition of 7,500 copies. The set included 2 LPs in a gatefold sleeve, an 8-page booklet, an XL poster, and a print replica of the historical New York Times frontpage.

== Album information ==
Director James Cameron originally intended Enya to compose the music, and in fact put together a rough edit of the film using her music as a temporary soundtrack. After she declined, he approached James Horner. Their relationship was strained after their first collaboration in Aliens, but the soundtrack to Braveheart made Cameron overlook it. Horner composed the soundtrack having in mind Enya's style; Norwegian singer Sissel Kyrkjebø performed the wordless vocals on the soundtrack.

Horner knew Sissel from the album Innerst i sjelen and he particularly liked how she sang the song "Eg Veit I Himmerik Ei Borg" ("I Know in Heaven There is a Castle"). Horner had tried 25 or 30 singers and, in the end, he chose Sissel to sing the wordless tune.

Céline Dion sang "My Heart Will Go On", the film's signature song composed by James Horner and Will Jennings. At first, Cameron did not want a song sung over the film's ending credits, but Horner disagreed. Without telling Cameron, he went ahead and wrote the song anyway, and recorded Dion singing it. Cameron changed his mind when Horner presented the song to him. "My Heart Will Go On" became a worldwide smash hit, going to the top of the music charts around the world. "My Heart Will Go On" won the 1997 Academy Award for Best Original Song as well as the Golden Globe Award for Best Original Song in 1998.

Other artists were invited to submit songs for the movie, including contemporary Christian artist Michael W. Smith. He mentions in the liner notes to the song "In My Arms Again" from his 1998 album Live the Life; "Inspired and written for the movie Titanic, grateful for the opportunity to send them a song; grateful it landed on this record."

For the choral background of certain tracks, Horner made use of a digital choir instead of a real one; after the orchestral music was recorded, Horner personally performed the synthesized choir over a playback of the recording. The idea behind using electronics, rather than a real choir, stemmed from Horner wanting to avoid a 'church'-like sound.

== Principal leitmotifs ==
Throughout the film, the composer created themes for particular characters, events, locations, and ideas.

- "Hymn to the Sea" – A sorrowful, melancholic theme which expresses the tragic side of the Titanic. It's also featured prominently in "Never An Absolution". This theme contains uilleann pipes and vocals by Sissel Kyrkjebø. An alternate version is first heard in the film's opening sequence. Furthermore, the track contains a menacing, descending, four-note motif which signifies the wreck of the ship and is first featured when Titanic's wreck site comes in view at the beginning of the film.
- "Southampton" – Uplifting, adventurous and rather heroic-sounding theme which signifies the spectacle of the Titanic. This melody features an electronic choir and snare drum clumps.
- "Distant Memories" – This leitmotif contains synth choir vocals and an aquatic, chiming tone. This piece is first heard when old Rose is taken aboard the "Keldysh".
- "Rose" – The sentimental theme of the film that is associated with the romance between Jack and Rose. Whilst in the major key for the most parts, this leitmotif's rousing chorus modulates to the relative minor key. The theme features orchestral violin, strings and piano. Electronic choir intrudes at times. Sissel Kyrkjebø performs the wordless vocals of this theme. This theme is first heard when Jack sees Rose for the first time on the deck and it would usually interpose during sequences when other music is playing, such as in "Hard to Starboard" and "Death of the Titanic".
- "Hard to Starboard" – This piece contains the ominous leitmotif associated with the iceberg (i.e. "Iceberg Theme"), which is first heard when the iceberg is spotted. It also contains a percussion-heavy, pulsating motif that corresponds to the peril and danger the characters endure during the sinking. Anvils are extensively used in this track.
- "Death of Titanic" – This track contains a descending, tumid and foreboding motif that also corresponds to peril and danger. It is played during the scene where the ship slowly starts to submerge into the ocean. To note, the descending cue is also heard in other tracks (i.e. "Unable to Stay, Unwilling to Leave"), such as when Jack and Rose are chased by Cal, although it sounds slightly altered.
- "2 1/2 Miles Down" – Although this track is mostly incidental, ambient music with droning synth voices and eerie strings, it features the menacing, descending, three-note motif which signifies the wreck of the ship and is first featured when Titanic's wreck site comes in view at the beginning of the film, which is also heard in "Hymn to the Sea".

== Commercial performance ==
Titanic: Music from the Motion Picture became the highest-selling primarily orchestral film score in history, with worldwide sales surpassing 30 million copies. The soundtrack quickly moved up the US Billboard 200, going from number eleven to number one on the chart in January 1998, keeping Shania Twain's Come On Over and Madonna's Ray of Light from reaching the top spot. It remained at the top for sixteen straight weeks until it was replaced by the Dave Matthews Band album Before These Crowded Streets. No album would spend at least ten consecutive weeks at number-one until Adele's 21 in the winter of 2012. The soundtrack has been certified 11× Platinum for 11 million copies shipped in the United States, becoming the best-selling album of 1998, and the fastest-certified soundtrack album ever.

The soundtrack also hit number-one in at least 14 other countries, including the United Kingdom, Canada, and Australia. The soundtrack was certified 5× Platinum by the ARIA in Australia for 350,000 copies shipped. It was certified 3× Platinum in the United Kingdom for over 900,000 copies shipped; and was certified diamond by the CRIA in Canada for 1 million copies shipped. The soundtrack is the best-selling non-Chinese CD album in Taiwan, selling 1.1 million copies.

The soundtrack's success led to the release of a second volume, called Back to Titanic which contained a mixture of previously unreleased soundtrack recordings and newly recorded performances of some of the songs in the film, including one track recorded by Clannad singer, Máire Brennan. Back to Titanic was certified platinum by the RIAA.

== Reception ==
James Southall of Movie Wave considered Horner's score to be highly effective in reinforcing the film's emotional impact, praising its dramatic sensibility and atmospheric opening passages. However, he criticised the action music as repetitive and derivative, and argued that the latter part of the score relied too heavily on orchestral variations of "My Heart Will Go On". Southall concluded that, despite its strengths, the album was overly long and fell short of Horner's finest works.

Christian Clemmensen of Filmtracks regarded Titanic as one of Horner's defining achievements, praising its memorable thematic writing, emotional effectiveness and contribution to the film's success. He highlighted the score's two principal themes, for the ship and the romance, commending their development throughout the film and the use of Sissel Kyrkjebø's wordless vocals, Celtic-inspired instrumentation, and new-age influences to create a distinctive atmosphere. Clemmensen also praised Horner's dramatic handling of the sinking sequence, particularly the interplay between orchestral and synthetic elements and the recurring motifs representing the ship's destruction and the characters' emotions.

While acknowledging longstanding criticism of the score's similarities to the music of Enya, Clemmensen argued that Horner successfully adapted the Celtic style to suit the film and that the simplicity of the score complemented the narrative. He further praised the performances of Celine Dion's "My Heart Will Go On" and Kyrkjebø's vocal contributions, and considered the expanded soundtrack releases, particularly the 2017 complete edition, to provide the definitive presentation of the score. Clemmensen concluded that Titanic was a landmark film score whose popularity helped introduce orchestral film music to a mainstream audience and regarded it as a strong contender for Horner's crowning achievement.

Stephen Thomas Erlewine of AllMusic praised Horner's score as a grand yet restrained work that effectively balanced romance, emotion and excitement without becoming overly melodramatic or sentimental. He particularly highlighted the haunting vocals of Sissel Kyrkjebø and Horner's blend of strings, orchestra, synthesizers and choral elements, concluding that the instrumental score was the soundtrack's greatest strength, while describing Celine Dion's "My Heart Will Go On" as a fitting, if secondary, addition.

== Track listing ==
=== Original release ===
All music is composed by and performed by James Horner, except where noted.

Titanic: Music from the Motion Picture track listing
No.	Title	Lyrics	Performer(s)	Length
1.	"Never an Absolution"			3:03
2.	"Distant Memories"			2:23
3.	"Southampton"			4:01
4.	"Rose"			2:52
5.	"Leaving Port"			3:26
6.	"Take Her to Sea, Mr. Murdoch"			4:31
7.	"Hard to Starboard"			6:52
8.	"Unable to Stay, Unwilling to Leave"			3:56
9.	"The Sinking"			5:05
10.	"Death of Titanic"			8:26
11.	"A Promise Kept"			6:02
12.	"A Life So Changed"			2:13
13.	"An Ocean of Memories"			7:57
14.	"My Heart Will Go On"	Will Jennings	Céline Dion	5:11
15.	"Hymn to the Sea"			6:26

=== Anniversary Edition (2012) ===
A two-disc edition comprised the original soundtrack as disc 1, and Gentlemen, It Has Been a Privilege Playing with You Tonight as disc 2.

A four-disc edition, released only in certain countries, moved Gentlemen to disc 3, with Back to Titanic as disc 2, and Popular Music From the Titanic Era as disc 4.

All tracks on Gentlemen, It Has Been a Privilege Playing with You Tonight performed by I Salonisti and produced by John Altman.

Gentlemen, It Has Been a Privilege Playing with You Tonight track listing
No.	Title	Music	Length
1.	"Valse Septembre"	Felix Godin	3:41
2.	"Marguerite Waltz"	Charles Gounod	2:35
3.	"Wedding Dance"	Paul Lincke	2:32
4.	"Poet and Peasant"	Franz von Suppé	6:50
5.	"Blue Danube"	Johann Strauss II	6:56
6.	"Song Without Words"	Pyotr Ilyich Tchaikovsky	2:38
7.	"Estudiantina"	Émile Waldteufel; Paul Lacôme (Note: Credited to lyricist Julien de Lau Lusignan and Lacôme.)	3:12
8.	"Vision of Salome"	Archibald Joyce	2:43
9.	"Titsy Bitsy Girl"	Ivan Caryll; Lionel Monckton	1:37
10.	"Alexander's Ragtime Band"	Irving Berlin	2:29
11.	"Sphinx"	Francis Popy; Léo Pouget; Pierre Chapella	3:49
12.	"Barcarole"	Jacques Offenbach	3:32
13.	"Orpheus"	Offenbach	8:41
14.	"Song of Autumn"	Joyce	3:54
15.	"Nearer My God to Thee"	Lowell Mason; Sarah Flower Adams	2:50

Popular Music from the Titanic Era track listing
No.	Title	Writer(s)	Performer(s)	Length
1.	"It's a Long Way to Tipperary"	Jack Judge; Henry James Williams	John McCormack	3:10
2.	"Let Me Call You Sweetheart"	Leo Friedman; Beth Slater Whitson	Halfway House Dance Orchestra	3:05
3.	"Vilia"	Franz Lehár	Guy Lombardo & His Orchestra	2:44
4.	"My Gal Sal"	Paul Dresser	Chick Bullock & His Levee Loungers	2:57
5.	"Oh! You Beautiful Doll"	Nat D. Ayer; Seymour Brown	Chuck Foster & His Orchestra	2:53
6.	"Martha"	Friedrich von Flotow	Adrian Rollini Trio	2:58
7.	"In the Shade of the Old Apple Tree"	Egbert Van Alstyne; Harry Williams	Duke Ellington & His Orchestra	3:11
8.	"Waiting at the Church"	Henry Pether; Fred Leigh	Beatrice Kay	2:38
9.	"Frasquita Serenade"	Léhar	John Kirby & His Orchestra	2:40
10.	"Shine On Harvest Moon"	Nora Bayes; Jack Norworth	Hal Kemp	3:06
11.	"From the Land of the Sky Blue Water"	Charles Wakefield Cadman; Nelle Richmond Eberhart	Mildred Bailey & Her Orchestra	2:47
12.	"Loch Lomond"	Traditional	Maxine Sullivan & Her Orchestra	2:57
13.	"A Hot Time in the Old Town Tonight"	Theodore August Metz; Joe Hayden	Miff Mole's Molers	2:46
14.	"Nearer My God to Thee"	Mason; Adams	Nelson Eddy	3:10

=== 20th Anniversary Edition (2017) ===
Discs 1–3 composed and produced by James Horner, except where noted.

Disc 1: Score Presentation
No.	Title	Length
1.	"Logo/Main Title"	2:28
2.	"2 1/2 Miles Down"	10:33
3.	"To the Keldysh / Rose Revealed"	1:43
4.	"Distant Memories"	2:24
5.	"My Drawing / Relics & Treasures"	1:52
6.	"Southampton"	4:00
7.	"Leaving Port"	3:27
8.	"Take Her to Sea, Mr. Murdoch"	4:31
9.	"First Sighting / Rose's Suicide Attempt"	3:05
10.	"Jack Saves Rose"	1:42
11.	"The Promenade / Butterfly Comb"	2:40
12.	"Rose"	2:54
13.	"The Portrait"	1:58
14.	"Lovejoy Chases Jack and Rose (Note: Based on the traditional Irish reel "Rakish Paddy".)"	2:24
15.	"Lovemaking"	2:26
16.	"Hard to Starboard" (extended version)	7:42
17.	"Rose Frees Jack"	2:41
Total length:		58:29

Disc 2: Score Presentation (Continued)
No.	Title	Length
1.	"A Building Panic" (film version)	7:25
2.	"Unable to Stay, Unwilling to Leave"	3:56
3.	"Trapped on 'D' Deck"	8:46
4.	"Murdoch's Suicide"	0:37
5.	"The Sinking"	5:06
6.	"Death of Titanic"	8:25
7.	"A Promise Kept"	6:03
8.	"A Life So Changed"	2:14
9.	"A Woman's Heart Is a Deep Ocean of Secrets"	1:43
10.	"An Ocean of Memories"	8:00
11.	"Post"	2:44
Total length:		54:59

Disc 3: Additional Music and Alternates
No.	Title	Length
1.	"Never an Absolution"	3:06
2.	"Trailer"	4:12
3.	"The Portrait" (album version)	4:43
4.	"Logo" (alternate extended version)	2:10
5.	"2 1/2 Miles Down" (alternate)	1:36
6.	"Southampton" (alternate)	3:05
7.	"Leaving Port" (with alternate ending)	3:00
8.	"Leaving Port" (alternate)	2:15
9.	"Take Her to Sea, Mr. Murdoch" (alternate)	4:29
10.	"Rose" (alternate)	2:58
11.	"Piano Theme—The Portrait"	5:00
12.	"Lovejoy Chases Jack" (alternate)	1:55
13.	"Hard to Starboard" (alternate)	6:50
14.	"A Building Panic" (album suite)	8:05
15.	"Death of Titanic" (alternate)	8:29
16.	"A Promise Kept" (alternate)	4:32
17.	"Hymn to the Sea"	6:26
Total length:		72:52

Disc 4: Source Music
No.	Title	Writer(s)	Performer(s)	Length
1.	"Valse Septembre"	Godin	I Salonisti	3:43
2.	"Marguerite Waltz"	Gounod	I Salonisti	2:34
3.	"Wedding Dance"	Lincke	I Salonisti	2:30
4.	"Poet and Peasant"	Suppé	I Salonisti	6:48
5.	"Blue Danube"	Strauss	I Salonisti	6:55
6.	"Song Without Words"	Tchaikovsky	I Salonisti	2:37
7.	"Estudiantina"	Waldteufel; Lacôme	I Salonisti	3:11
8.	"Oh, You Beautiful Doll"	Ayer; Brown	William Ross (cond.)	2:12
9.	"Blarney Pilgrims"	Traditional	Gaelic Storm	2:11
10.	"John Ryan's Polka"	Traditional	Gaelic Storm	2:53
11.	"Kesh Jig"	Traditional	Gaelic Storm	1:59
12.	"Drowsy Maggie Dance"	Traditional	Gaelic Storm	1:22
13.	"Come Josephine in My Flying Machine"	Fred Fisher; Alfred Bryan	William Ross (cond.)	1:46
14.	"The Merry Widow"	Lehár	William Ross (cond.)	1:30
15.	"Méditation de Thaïs"	Jules Massenet	I Salonisti	4:25
16.	"Vision of Salome"	Joyce	I Salonisti	2:42
17.	"Titsy Bitsy Girl"	Caryll; Monckton	I Salonisti	1:35
18.	"Alexander's Ragtime Band"	Berlin	I Salonisti	1:46
19.	"Sphinx"	Popy; Pouget; Chapella	I Salonisti	3:48
20.	"Barcarole"	Offenbach	I Salonisti	3:31
21.	"Orpheus"	Offenbach	I Salonisti	8:40
22.	"Song of Autumn"	Joyce	I Salonisti	3:53
23.	"Nearer My God to Thee" (extended version)	Mason; Adams	I Salonisti	3:14
Total length:				76:30

Disc 4, tracks 1–7, 15–23 produced by John Altman. Tracks 9–12 produced by Randy Gerston. Tracks 8, 13, 14 arranged and conducted by William Ross.

== Personnel ==
Adapted from AllMusic.

- Andy Bass – assistant engineer
- Bob Bornstein – music preparation
- James Cameron – liner notes
- Sandy De Crescent – orchestra contractor
- Celine Dion – primary artist, vocals
- Simon Franglen – producer, keyboards
- Marc Gebauer – scoring engineer
- Frank Harkins – art direction, design
- Jim Henrikson – supervising music editor
- Anthony Hinnigan – tin whistle
- James Horner – composer, conductor, orchestrator, primary artist, producer, keyboards
- The Hollywood Studio Symphony – orchestra
- Will Jennings – lyricist
- Randy Kerber – keyboards
- Lesley Langs – assistant music editor
- David Marquette – assistant engineer
- Shawn Murphy – engineer, mixing, recording
- Joe E. Rand – music editor
- Eric Rigler – Uilleann pipes
- Jay Selvester – scoring engineer
- Sissel – vocals
- Kirsten Smith – scoring engineer
- Pat Sullivan – mastering
- Ian Underwood – keyboards, woodwinds

== Charts ==
=== Weekly charts ===
Chart (1997–98)	Peak position
Australian Albums (ARIA)	1
Austrian Albums (Ö3 Austria)	1
Belgian Albums (Flanders)	1
Belgian Albums (Wallonia)	1
Canadian Albums (Billboard)	1
Danish Albums (Hitlisten)	1
Dutch Albums (Album Top 100)	1
Finnish Albums (Suomen virallinen lista)	1
French Albums (SNEP)	1
German Albums (Offizielle Top 100)	1
Hungarian Albums (MAHASZ)	1
Irish Albums (IRMA)	1
Italian Albums (FIMI)	2
Japanese Albums (Oricon)	3
Malaysian Albums (RIM)	1
New Zealand Albums (RMNZ)	1
Norwegian Albums (VG-lista)	1
Portugal Albums (AFP)	1
Singaporean Albums (SPVA)	2
Spanish Albums (PROMUSICAE)	1
Swedish Albums (Sverigetopplistan)	1
Swiss Albums (Schweizer Hitparade)	1
Taiwanese International Albums (IFPI)	1
UK Albums (OCC)	1
US Billboard 200	1

=== Monthly charts ===
Chart (1999)	Peak position
South Korean Albums (RIAK)	17

=== Year-end charts ===
Chart (1998)	Position
Australian Albums (ARIA)	3
Austrian Albums (Ö3 Austria)	1
Belgian Albums (Ultratop Flanders)	3
Belgian Albums (Ultratop Wallonia)	2
Canada Top Albums (RPM)	1
Dutch Albums (MegaCharts)	7
European Albums (Music & Media)	2
French Albums (SNEP)	2
German Albums (Offizielle Top 100)	1
New Zealand Albums (RMNZ)	13
Swiss Albums (Schweizer Hitparade)	2
UK Albums (OCC)	10
US Billboard 200	1

Chart (1999)	Position
US Billboard 200	194

=== End-of-decade charts ===
Chart (1990–1999)	Position
U.S. Billboard 200	5

=== Best of all time charts (Top 200) ===
Chart	Position
US Billboard 200	163

== Certifications and sales ==
Region	Certification	Certified units/sales
Argentina (CAPIF)	Platinum	60,000^{^}
Australia (ARIA)	5× Platinum	350,000^{^}
Austria (IFPI Austria)	2× Platinum	100,000^{*}
Belgium (BRMA)	3× Platinum	150,000^{*}
Brazil	—	650,000
Canada (Music Canada)	Diamond	1,200,000
China	—	1,000,000
Finland (Musiikkituottajat)	Platinum	73,509
France (SNEP)	Diamond	1,600,000
Germany (BVMI)	5× Gold	1,300,000
Hong Kong (IFPI Hong Kong)	Platinum	20,000^{*}
Italy	—	800,000
Japan (RIAJ)	Million	1,410,000
Mexico	—	500,000
Netherlands (NVPI)	7× Platinum	175,000^{^}
New Zealand (RMNZ)	Platinum	15,000^{^}
Norway (IFPI Norway)	2× Platinum	119,000
Philippines	—	230,000
Portugal	—	100,000
Poland (ZPAV)	7× Platinum	700,000^{*}
Singapore (RIAS)	Platinum	15,000
Spain (Promusicae)	4× Platinum	650,000
Sweden (GLF)	2× Platinum	160,000^{^}
Switzerland (IFPI Switzerland)	4× Platinum	200,000^{^}
Taiwan (RIT)	21× Platinum	1,164,229
Thailand	—	300,000
United Kingdom (BPI)	3× Platinum	1,002,000
United States (RIAA)	11× Platinum	11,171,000
Summaries
Europe (IFPI)	5× Platinum	5,000,000^{*}
Worldwide	—	30,000,000
^{*} Sales figures based on certification alone.^{^} Shipments figures based on certification alone.

== See also ==
- List of best-selling albums
- List of best-selling albums in Brazil
- List of best-selling albums in China
- List of best-selling albums in Europe
- List of best-selling albums in France
- List of best-selling albums in Germany
- List of best-selling albums in Italy
- List of best-selling albums in Japan
- List of best-selling albums in the Philippines
- List of best-selling albums in Taiwan
- List of best-selling albums in the United States
- List of diamond-certified albums in Canada
