= Back to Titanic =

Soundtrack album by James Horner
- Released: August 25, 1998
- Recorded: February 2, 1998 – July 9, 1998
- Genre: Soundtrack
- Length: 79:05
- Label: Sony Music
- Producer: James Horner

James Horner chronology
The Mask of Zorro (1998)	Back to Titanic (1998)	Mighty Joe Young (1998)

Professional ratings
Review scores
Source	Rating
Allmusic	3/5 stars

Back to Titanic is the second soundtrack album released for the film, which contains a mixture of previously unreleased recordings and newly recorded performances of some of the tracks heard in the film.

== Commercial performance ==
Although it did not manage to reach the success of its counterpart soundtrack, Back to Titanic was a commercial success.

It debuted at No. 7 on the Billboard 200 and then the following week reached its peak position at No. 2 with 164,000 copies sold. Back to Titanic has been certified Platinum in the United States for sales of over 1 million copies. It was also certified gold in Japan for 100,000 copies shipped to stores in September 1998.

In 2012, the album was re-issued with its predecessor as part of the Collector's Anniversary Edition for the 3D re-release of the film.

== Track listing ==
Music composed and conducted by James Horner, except where noted.

No.	Title	Writer(s)	Artist	Length
1.	"Titanic Suite"	James Horner	James Horner (Note: Performed by the London Symphony Orchestra and the Choristers of King's College, Cambridge.)	19:05
2.	"An Irish Party in Third Class (Note: Includes "John Ryan's Polka" and "Blarney Pilgrim".)"	Traditional	Gaelic Storm	3:48
3.	"Alexander's Ragtime Band"	Irving Berlin	I Salonisti	2:31
4.	"The Portrait"	Horner	James Horner	4:44
5.	"Jack Dawson's Luck (Note: Includes "Humours of Caledon", "The Red-Haired Lass", "The Boys on the Hilltop" and "The Bucks of Oranmore".)"	Traditional	James Horner	5:39
6.	"A Building Panic"	Horner	James Horner	8:09
7.	"Nearer My God to Thee"	Lowell Mason; Sarah Flower Adams	I Salonisti	2:51
8.	"Come Josephine, in My Flying Machine"	Fred Fisher; Alfred Bryan	Máire Brennan	3:33
9.	"Lament (Note: includes "A Spailpín A Rún".)"	Traditional	James Horner	4:37
10.	"A Shore Never Reached"	Horner	James Horner (Note: Performed by the London Symphony Orchestra.)	4:27
11.	"My Heart Will Go On" (with dialogue from the film)	Horner; Will Jennings	Celine Dion	4:43
12.	"Nearer My God to Thee"	Mason; Adams	Eileen Ivers	2:23
13.	"Epilogue – The Deep and Timeless Sea"	Horner	James Horner	12:38

== Charts ==
=== Weekly charts ===
Chart (1998)	Peak position
Australian Albums (ARIA)	7
Austrian Albums (Ö3 Austria)	9
Belgian Albums (Ultratop Flanders)	12
Belgian Albums (Ultratop Wallonia)	10
Dutch Albums (Album Top 100)	10
French Albums (SNEP)	4
German Albums (Offizielle Top 100)	3
Hungarian Albums (MAHASZ)	11
New Zealand Albums (RMNZ)	3
Scottish Albums (OCC)	17
Swedish Albums (Sverigetopplistan)	29
Swiss Albums (Schweizer Hitparade)	2
UK Albums (OCC)	10
US Billboard 200	2

=== Year-end charts ===
Chart (1998)	Position
Australian Albums (ARIA)	94
Belgian Albums (Ultratop Wallonia)	90
Dutch Albums (Album Top 100)	96
French Albums (SNEP)	50
German Albums (Offizielle Top 100)	54
UK Albums (OCC)	86
US Billboard 200	101

== Certifications ==
Region	Certification	Certified units/sales
Australia (ARIA)	Gold	35,000^{^}
Canada (Music Canada)	3× Platinum	300,000^{^}
France (SNEP)	2× Gold	200,000^{*}
Germany (BVMI)	Gold	250,000^{^}
Japan (RIAJ)	Platinum	200,000^{^}
Netherlands (NVPI)	Platinum	25,000^{^}
Switzerland (IFPI Switzerland)	Gold	25,000^{^}
United Kingdom (BPI)	Gold	100,000^{^}
United States (RIAA)	Platinum	1,000,000^{^}
^{*} Sales figures based on certification alone.^{^} Shipments figures based on certification alone.
