= Cloud Chief =

Cloud Chief may refer to:

- "Cloud-Chief", a 1910 intermezzo composed by J. Ernest Philie
- Cloud Chief, Oklahoma, an unincorporated community in Washita County, Oklahoma
