= Any Little Girl, That's a Nice Little Girl, Is the Right Little Girl for Me =

1910 song

External audio
- You may hear the Shep Fields Rippling Rhythm Orchestra performing "Any Little Girl, That's a Nice Little Girl, Is the Right Little Girl for Me" with the vocalist Hal Derwin and accordionist John Serry Sr. in 1938 Here

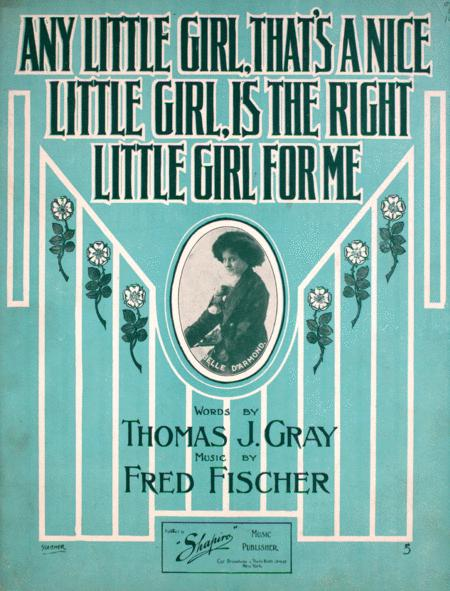
Sheet music cover, 1910

"Any Little Girl, That's a Nice Little Girl, Is the Right Little Girl for Me" is a popular song, first published in 1910, and written by Thomas J. Gray and Fred Fisher. Although largely forgotten today (like many popular songs of the era), a 1911 recording of the song by Billy Murray on Zon-O-Phone Records survives, and is widely accessible because the recording has entered the public domain. It was also featured in a Max Fleischer "Follow the Bouncing Ball" sing-a-long animated cartoon in the early 1930s. The song appears on the soundtrack of the 1933 film Stage Mother. Subsequently, in 1938 it was recorded for Bluebird Records by Shep Fields and his orchestra, with the accordionist John Serry Sr.

== See also ==
- 1910 in music
- 1911 in music
- Ada Jones
