= Ernest and Clarence Iverson =

American radio personalities

Ernest and Clarence Iverson were popular radio personalities on Twin Cities stations WDGY and KEYD during the 1930s and 1940s. Ernest (1903–1958) was known as Slim Jim. His brother Clarence (1905–1990) was the Vagabond Kid. Together they performed an eclectic mix of music ranging from country western and Tin Pan Alley to gospel hymns and Scandinavian ballads.

== Norwegian-American entertainers ==
Slim Jim and the Vagabond Kid 1940s

The Iversons, who were born near Binford, North Dakota, came from a large Norwegian-American family. When their mother died in 1910, their father hired a Norwegian immigrant housekeeper named Molly Rood. She not only taught the boys how to play the guitar but also a significant part of their Norwegian-language repertoire.

Ernest Iverson left the Midwest as a young man and after an injury in the oil fields of Texas made heavy work impossible, he turned to radio for employment. In Wichita Falls and Omaha he established himself as a radio personality and singer. Then he headed north and got a job on a Minneapolis radio station.

By the early 1930s Ernest and his younger brother Clarence had reunited and formed an act as Slim Jim and the Vagabond Kid. During their heyday in the 1930s and 1940s the Iversons not only had a daily radio show but also performed live with their own band. Their half-hour radio broadcasts usually ended with some words of inspiration and a song of faith. Listeners might hear It Is No Secret, Just A Closer Walk With Thee or The Old Rugged Cross.

One of Slim Jim's longtime sponsors was the Town Market Furniture Company, whose working class clientele were well suited to the unpretentious performer. Some of his other sponsors were less reputable. Hamlin's Wizard Oil, the underwriter of an early songbook, was nothing more than a patent medicine company. One of its advertising slogans was "Cures all pain in man or beast". Crazy Water Crystals was in reality an overpriced laxative.

== Later years ==
The Iverson brothers were fixtures on Twin Cities radio until Clarence entered the army in 1943. After seeing action in France, he once again teamed up with his brother Ernest. In 1948 Clarence left show business. For many years he and his wife Frances operated a nursery in Blaine, Minnesota. They moved back to their hometown of Binford, North Dakota in 1970.

Slim Jim continued as a solo act in the 1950s. He had a daily radio show and hosted the television program "Slim Jim’s Westerners". He was much in demand for live performances and made a number of records. His death in 1958 was mourned by thousands of fans. Having married into the Ruschmeyer family of Buffalo Lake, Minnesota, he was buried in the town cemetery there. His wife DeLoris, who never remarried, survived him by fifty years.

Ernest Iverson was inducted into the Pavek Museum of Broadcasting's Hall of Fame in 2003.

== Recording artists ==
In the 1940s and 1950s Slim Jim and the Vagabond Kid released about thirty songs — primarily for the FM Recording Co. — but also for the Soma and Twinco labels. One of the most popular efforts was The Drifting, Whistling Snow, an inspired take-off on the 1955 country western hit The Shifting, Whispering Sands.

After Iverson's death in 1958 Soma Records released an album, which combined Slim Jim's solo recordings on the Soma label with FM recordings he had done with his brother Clarence. The tracks included comic dialect songs, the plaintive ballad Jeg Er En Fattig Liten Dreng (I Am A Poor Little Boy), Nikolina — in both Norwegian and English — and the gospel hymn A Beautiful Life. The LP "Slim Jim sings Nikolina and other favorites" was available in Midwestern record stores until the late 1970s.

In 1980 Howard Pine, who had worked on Slim Jim's radio show, released the first of four albums taken from the artist's broadcast performances. As recently as 2006 he released the CD "Rocking Chair Radio" with twelve more tracks by the singer. These live recordings from the early 1950s were remastered from acetate discs made by Slim Jim's sound engineer. In 1980 Clarence Iverson came out of retirement and recorded an album, produced by Pine, called "The Vagabond Kid sings Great Grand Dad".

== Musical repertoire ==
Jeg Er Saa Glad Hver Julekveld 1917

The Iversons were transitional figures, who bridged the gap between Scandinavian immigrants and their American-born descendants. The brothers' 1939 songbook was mostly in English but had a few Norwegian songs such as Kom Til Den Hvitmalte Kirke (The Church In The Wildwood) and Det Døende Barn (The Dying Child), whose author was Hans Christian Andersen.

Slim Jim and the Kid were songwriters with such titles as My Gal With The Pretty Red Hair and Can I Play My Guitar In Heaven to their credit. Their 1937 collection of cowboy and mountain ballads, however, had only a handful of original songs. Among the old favorites in the book were Silver Threads Among the Gold, Frankie And Johnny and The Yellow Rose Of Texas. On the radio the Iversons would even sing current hits like When It's Lamp Lighting Time In The Valley and Mockin' Bird Hill. A program might also have Play a Simple Melody by Irving Berlin or the romantic The West, A Nest And You.

Slim Jim sided with the working man, and his first songbook included an adaptation of The Popular Wobbly by the Finnish-American labor activist T-Bone Slim. The Popular Wobbly was a parody of the 1917 song They Go Wild Simply Wild Over Me. In addition, the book had several songs that had been recorded by country music pioneer Carson Robison.

The Iverson Brothers published songbooks in 1931, 1937 and 1939. All three are on file at the Minnesota Historical Society.

Ernest and Clarence acknowledged their Norwegian roots with songs like Ungdoms Mynder (Memories Of Youth) and Jeg Er Saa Glad Hver Julekveld (I Am So Glad Each Christmas Eve). They also performed songs that poked fun at themselves and their countrymen, such as Scandinavian Hot Shot or John Johnson’s Wedding.

The Iversons were also influenced by artists of an earlier generation. Nikolina had been a huge hit for the Swedish immigrant singer Hjalmar Peterson. Slim Jim and the Kid recorded the song in English, and their version has remained popular with generations of Scandinavian-Americans.

== The Snoose Boulevard Festival ==
Cedar Avenue 1890

The Snoose Boulevard Festival was held in the Cedar-Riverside neighborhood of Minneapolis from 1972 through 1977. In the late 19th century Cedar Avenue became known as "Snoose Boulevard", a nickname often given to the main street in Scandinavian communities. The term derived from the residents’ fondness for snus (snuff), an inexpensive form of tobacco. The event, which celebrated the area's Scandinavian past, featured the music, food, and arts of the immigrants who had once lived there. It also highlighted the careers of Olle i Skratthult (Hjalmar Peterson), Slim Jim and the Vagabond Kid (Ernest and Clarence Iverson) and the Olson Sisters (Eleonora and Ethel Olson).

The headline performer was the Swedish-born singer Anne-Charlotte Harvey. In conjunction with the festival she recorded three albums of folk tunes, emigrant ballads, hymns, waltzes and comic songs. The non-profit Olle i Skratthult Project sponsored the annual celebration and the recordings. Harvey's albums, produced by the renowned ethnomusicologist Maury Bernstein, included six songs from the Iverson Brothers' repertoire.

== See also ==
- Scandinavian dialect humor
- Wobblies

== Gallery ==
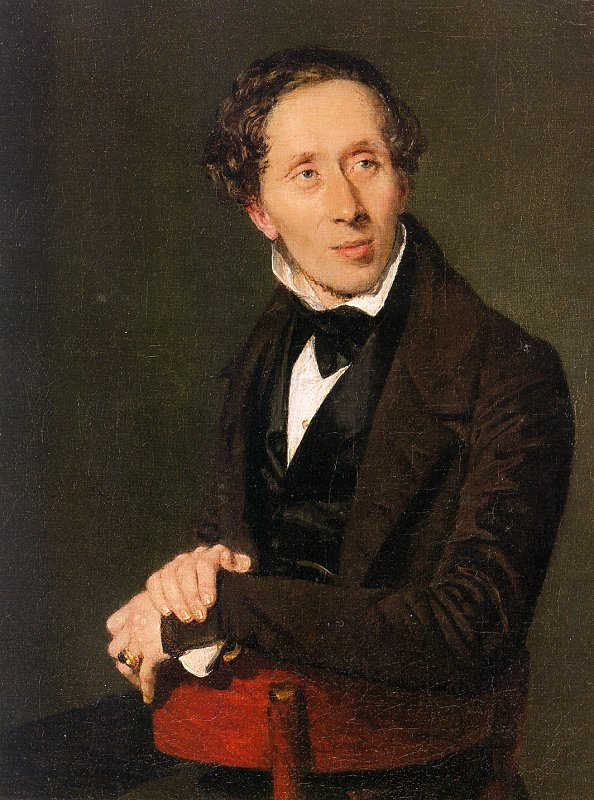
Hans Christian Andersen 1836

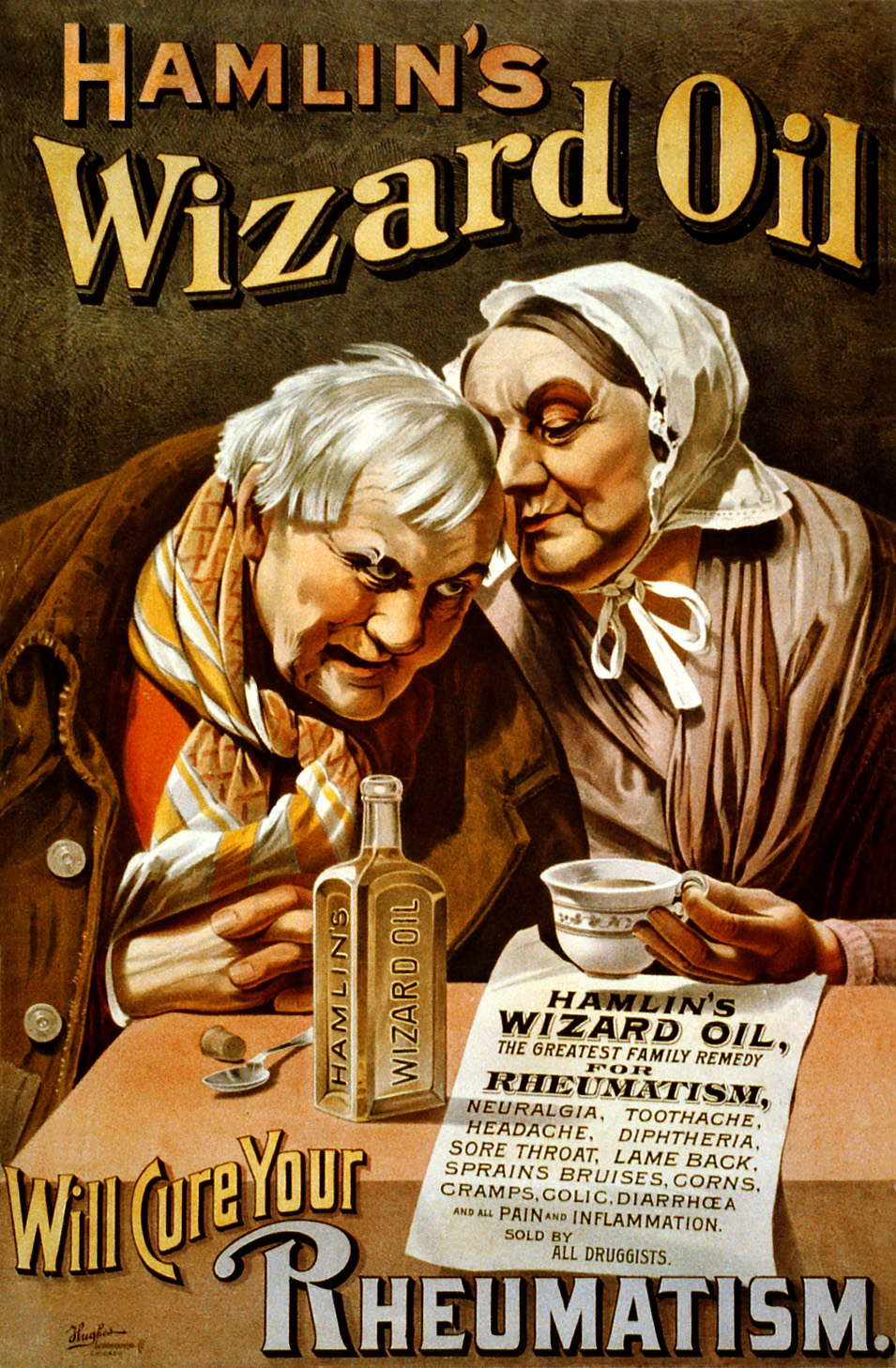
Hamlin's Wizard Oil 1890

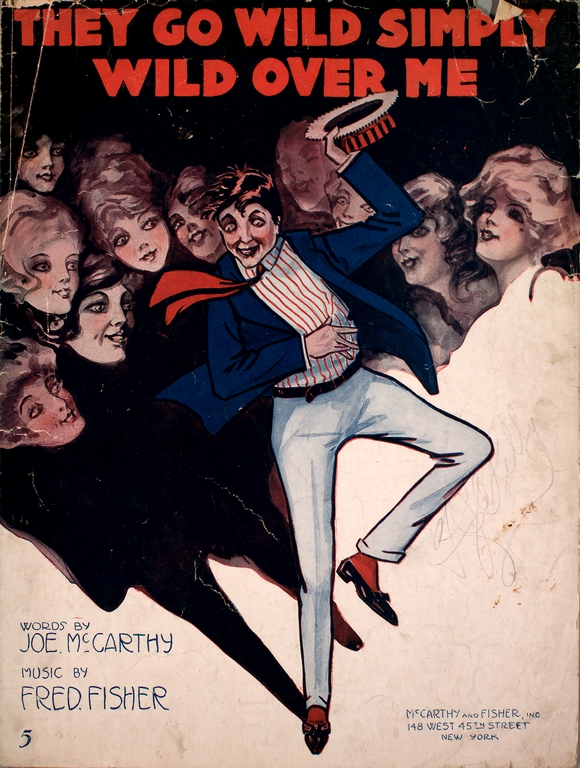
They Go Wild Simply Wild Over Me 1917

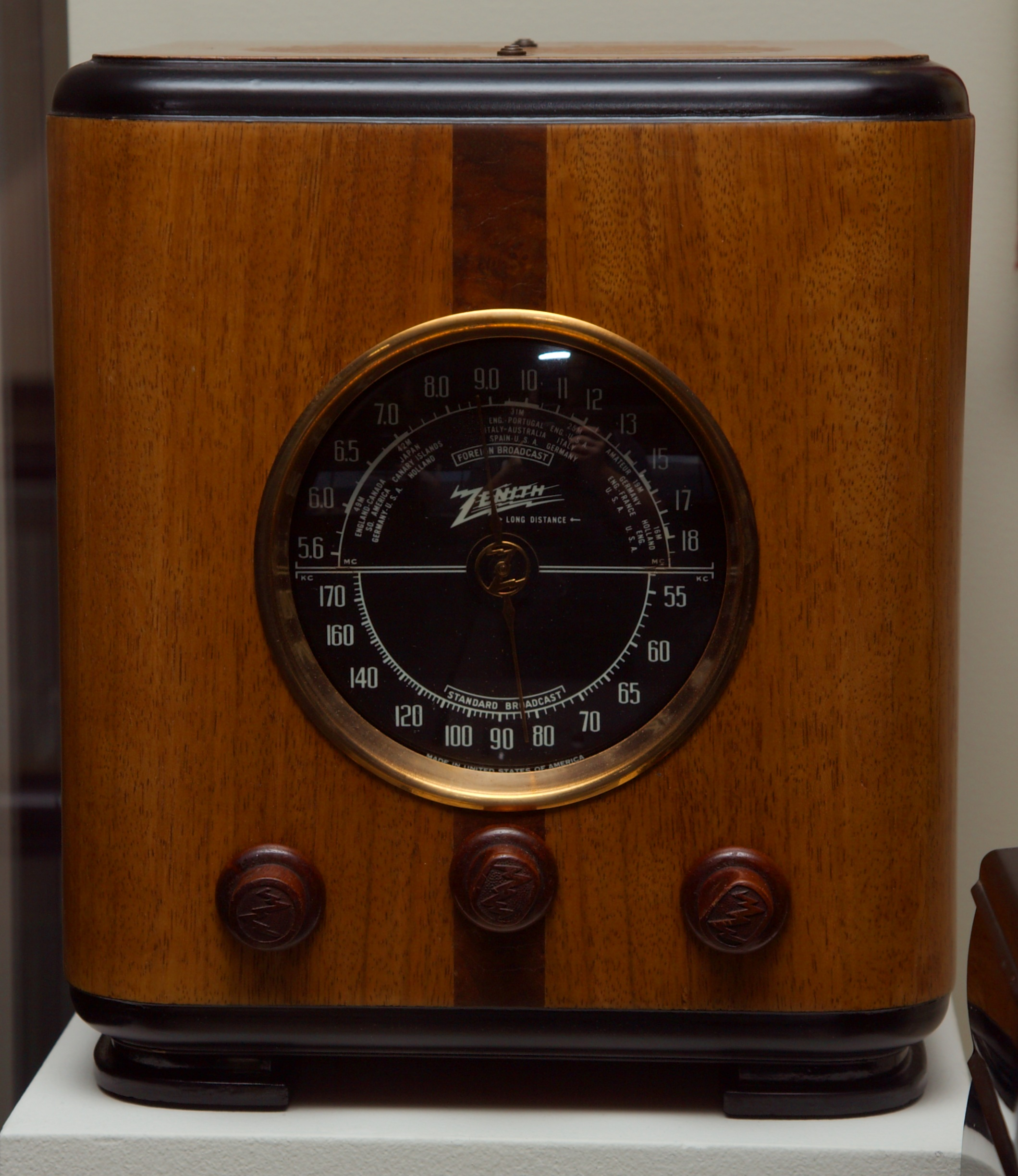
Zenith Radio 1937
