= The Popular Wobbly =

Song
- Published: 1920
- Composer(s): Fred Fisher
- Lyricist(s): T-Bone Slim

"The Popular Wobbly" is a labor song written by the Finnish-American songwriter T-Bone Slim. It is a parody of the 1917 hit "They Go Wild Simply Wild Over Me" by Joseph McCarthy and Fred Fisher.

"The Popular Wobbly" first appeared in the 1920 edition of the Little Red Songbook published by the Industrial Workers of the World. Its title referred to the "Wobbly" nickname that was often given to IWW members.

The song was revived during the Civil Rights Movement of the 1960s. Candie Carawan wrote new lyrics that told about her 1960 arrest while taking part in desegregation sit-ins in Nashville, Tennessee. The Guy and Candie Carawan version is known as They Go Wild Over Me. An adaptation of "The Popular Wobbly" was also included in a 1931 songbook published by radio personality Ernest Iverson.

Pete Seeger, Utah Phillips and Joe Glazer are among the well-known singers who have performed the song.
