= Herbjørn Gausta =

Norwegian-American artist (1854-1924)

Herbjørn Gaustå
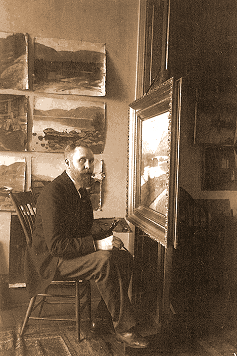
- Born: Herbjørn Nilson Gaustå; June 16, 1854; Mæl, Sweden-Norway
- Died: May 22, 1924 (aged 69); Minnesota
- Resting place: Harmony, Minnesota

Herbjørn Nilson Gaustå also Herbjorn Gausta (June 16, 1854 – May 22, 1924) was an American artist who is best known for his landscapes, portraits, and scenes from rural settings. He left an early record of immigrant life in his portraits and paintings and helped establish a place for art in the culture of Norwegian-Americans.

== Biography ==
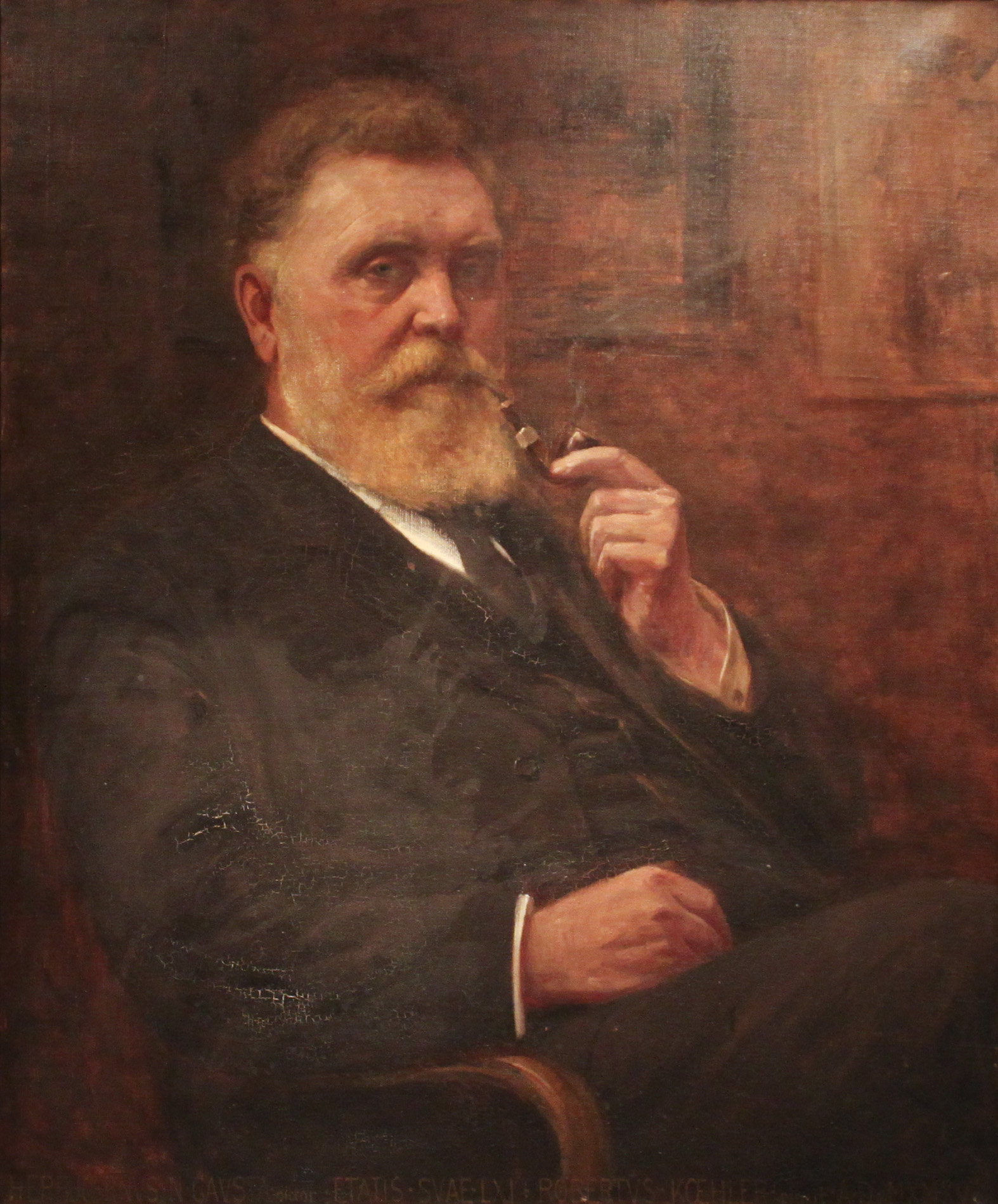
Herbjørn Gausta: Robert Koehler 1915

Gausta was born on the Gausta farm in the Mæl parish in Tinn Municipality in Telemark county, Norway. In 1867, Gausta immigrated to America with his parents and four sisters, settling on a farm near Harmony, Minnesota. Gausta entered a training program for parochial school teachers at Luther College in 1872. He left for Europe three years later on a stipend provided by the community of Decorah, Iowa under the leadership of The Rev. Ulrik Vilhelm Koren. Gausta studied at Knud Bergslien's Academy of Art in Oslo and also attended the Academy of Fine Arts, Munich.

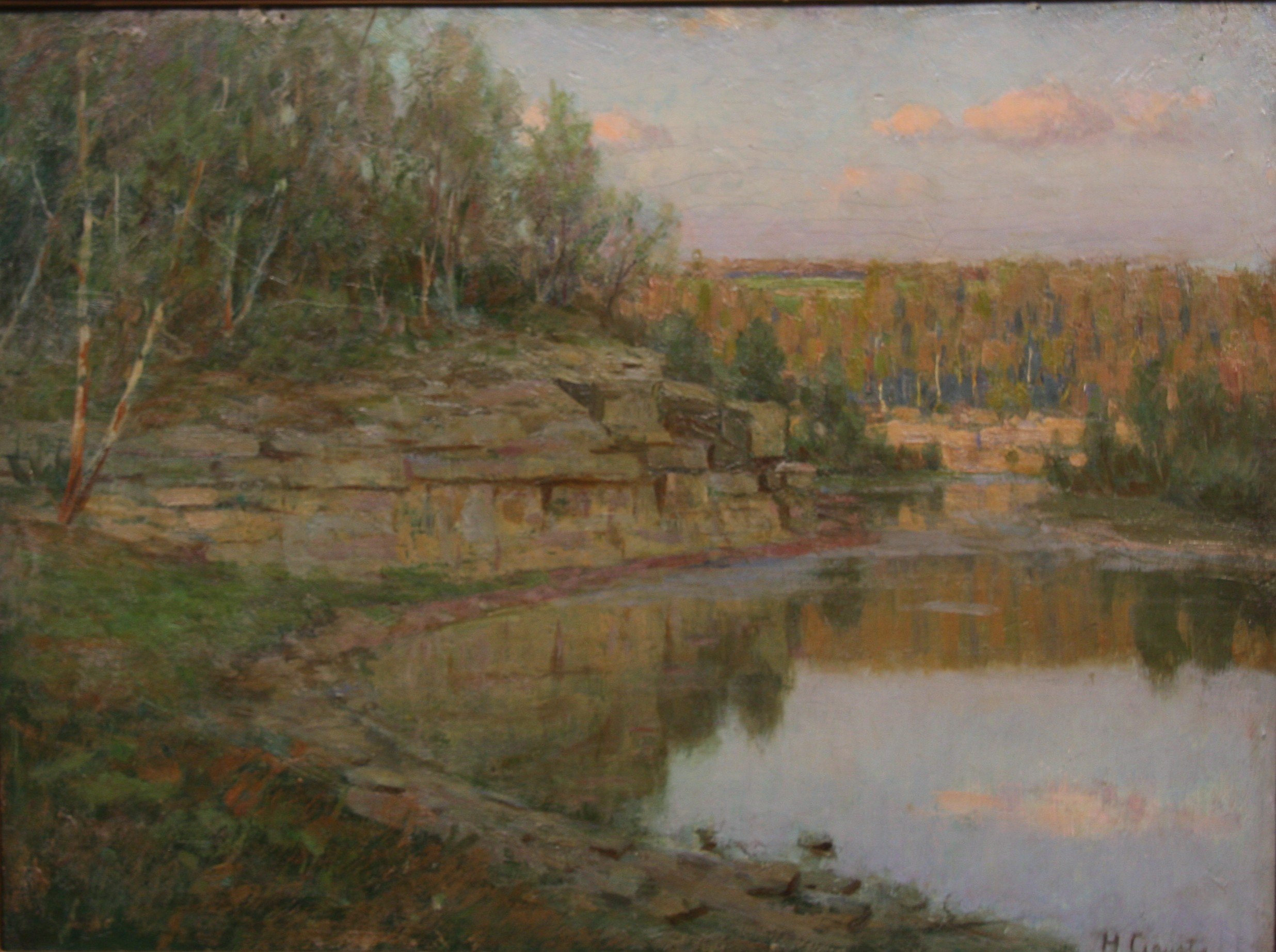
Southern Minnesota Lake Scene: Gausta before 1888

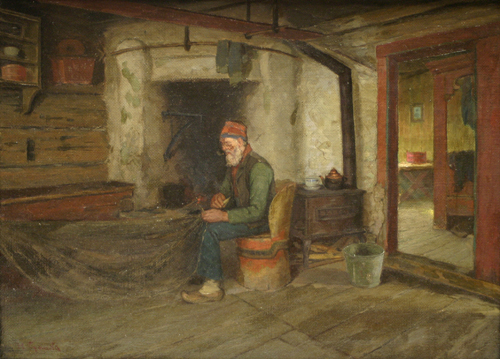
Mending the Net: Gausta about 1900

He returned to Decorah and taught at Luther College during the 1886-1887 academic year. He lived with the U.V. Koren family at the Washington Prairie parsonage while teaching at Luther College. Subsequently, Gausta based his studio in Minneapolis, MN, where he supported himself principally by painting portraits of prominent Norwegian-Americans and producing altarpieces for Lutheran churches. His landscapes and genre paintings were well-received, particularly those painted during his early years. There are almost 60 paintings by Gausta in the Fine Arts Collection of Luther College.

Gausta was good friends with the entertainers Eleonora and Ethel Olson. Yust For Fun, a book published by the Olson Sisters in 1925, had two illustrations that he may have drawn.

Gausta taught at the University of Minnesota until his death in 1924. Gausta, who never married, was buried in Harmony, Minnesota, alongside a 16-foot granite monument which was erected in his honor in 1927.
