= Axel Skovgaard =

Danish musician

- The Danish Ole Bull
- Born: Axel Skovgaard; May 20, 1875; Copenhagen, Denmark
- Occupation: violinist
- Spouse: Alice McClung

Axel Skovgaard was a Danish violinist, who performed throughout the United States and Canada during the first three decades of the 20th century.

== European beginnings ==
Axel Skovgaard was born May 20, 1875, in Copenhagen, Denmark. He showed promise at an early age and began his musical studies at the age of six. In the years that followed he studied with the famed violinists Carl Halir, Emanuel Wirth and Joseph Joachim.

As a young man Skovgaard performed in much of Scandinavia and Germany and appeared before the rulers of Denmark, Norway, Sweden and Germany. He was also a member of the Meiningen Court Orchestra and the Copenhagen Philharmonic.

In 1902 he purchased a 1712 Stradivarius violin, which became his constant companion and instrument of choice.

== American career ==
Skovgaard came to America in 1903 when he accepted a position with the New York Symphony Orchestra under the direction of Walter Damrosch. By 1905 he had formed the Skovgaard Concert Company along with pianist Christine Nilsson and vocalist Eleonora Olson. Within a few years both Nilsson and Olson had left the group. Eleonora Olson started her own company in 1909 with which she enjoyed considerable success.

Alice McClung became Skovgaard's new accompanist. McClung, who had been a student of the Swedish pianist August Hyllestad, was a talented soloist and ensemble player. She joined Skovgaard's company in 1908 and eventually became his wife. The couple played together for over thirty years, their partnership lasting until Alice Skovgaard's death in 1946.

From 1905 onwards, Skovgaard traveled the country, often giving concerts under the auspices of the Chautauqua and Lyceum organizations. Their publications are, in fact, the primary source of information on the Danish violin virtuoso.

Axel Skovgaard toured constantly, giving over one thousand performances during one nine-year stretch. His American tours were well-documented in the small town press, and many of these accounts can be read at the Newspaper Archive and similar sites.

The Library of Congress has Skovgaard concert programs, which list several of the works he performed. Although he himself made no recordings, this portion of his repertoire can be heard at video-sharing websites or purchased from digital music download services.

== Music played by Axel Skovgaard ==
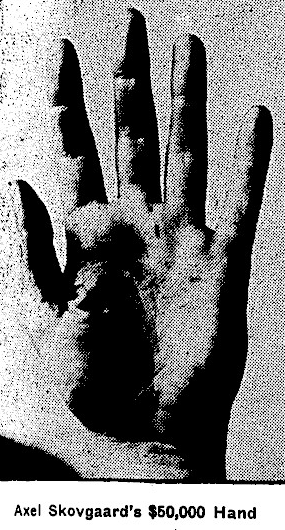
Axel Skovgaard's hand photographed and published in the Daily Illini, 1911.

- Ballade et Polonaise - Vieuxtemps
- The Bee - Schubert
- Chant sans paroles - Tchaikovsky
- Fantaisie Hongroise - Hubay
- Kreutzer Sonata - Beethoven
- La Folia - Corelli
- Humoresque - Dvořák
- Nocturne - Chopin
- Scenes de la Csarda - Hubay
- Serenade - Schubert
- Sicilienne et Rigaudon - Kreisler
- Traumerei - Schumann
- Violin Concerto in D major - Brahms
- Violin Concerto in F sharp minor - Ernst
- Violin Concerto in E minor - Mendelssohn
- Violin Concerto in A major - Svendsen
- Violin Concerto in F sharp minor - Vieuxtemps
- Violin Sonata in E minor - Sjögren
- Zapateado - Sarasate
