= Oui, Oui, Marie =

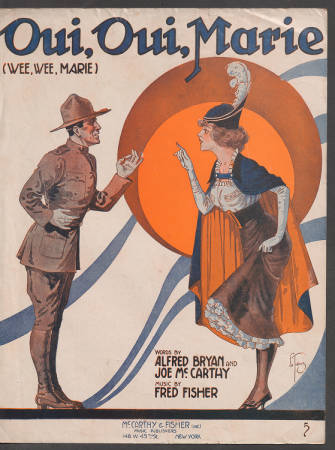
- Sheet music cover

Song
- Published: 1918
- Composer: Fred Fisher
- Lyricists: Alfred Bryan, Joe McCarthy

Oui, Oui, Marie is a 1918 song composed by Fred Fisher with lyrics written by Alfred Bryan and Joe McCarthy. It was published by McCarthy & Fisher Inc. The sheet music cover featured an illustration by Andre De Takacs. The song was in the top 20 charts from September 1918 to February 1919 and reached number 10 in December. It was recorded by Arthur Fields, Irving Kaufman, and Rachel Grant & Billy Murray. The sheet music can be found at the Pritzker Military Museum & Library.

The cover art for the song featured a woman dressed in a cape with a feathered hat speaking to a soldier.

A cover version was recorded by Chelsea Wolfe for the 2022 American slasher film X. The song’s original version would make an appearance in its prequel Pearl.

== Analysis ==
The lyrics for Oui Oui, Marie center on a soldier named Johnny who falls in love with a French girl named Marie. He flirts with her even though he doesn't know how to speak French.

== Lyrics ==
Poor Johnny's heart went pity pity pat,

Somewhere in sunny France.

He meet a girl by chance with ze naughty naughty glance,

She looked just like a kitty kitty cat,

She loved to dance and play,

Tho' he learned no French when he left the trench,

He knew well enough to say:

Chorus

Oui Oui Marie will you do zis for me

Oui Oui Marie then I'll do zat for you,

I love your eyes they make me feel so spoony,

You'll drive me loony, you're teasing me,

Why can't we parley vous like other sweet hearts do,

I want a kiss or two from Ma Cherie,

Oui Oui Marie, if you'll do zis for me

Then I'll do zat for you,

Oui Oui Marie.

They walked along the boule boulevard,

He whispered "You for me,

Some day in gay Paree

I will make you marry me,"

Just then a bunch of bully bully boys,

Threw kisses on the sly,

Marie got wise when they rolled their eyes,

They sang as they passed her by.

Chorus

Oui Oui Marie will you do zis for me

Oui Oui Marie then I'll do zat for you,

I love your eyes they make me feel so spoony,

You'll drive me loony, you're teasing me,

Why can't we parley vous like other sweet hearts do,

I want a kiss or two from Ma Cherie,

Oui Oui Marie, if you'll do zis for me

Then I'll do zat for you,

Oui Oui Marie.

Oui Oui Marie will you do zis for me

Oui Oui Marie then I'll do zat for you,

I love your eyes they make me feel so spoony,

You'll drive me loony, you're teasing me,

I cannot learn to speak, the latin French or Greek,

But I can kiss the cheek of Ma Cherie,

Oui Oui Marie, if you'll do zis for me

Then I'll do zat for you,

Oui Oui Marie.
