= Lorraine (My Beautiful Alsace Lorraine) =

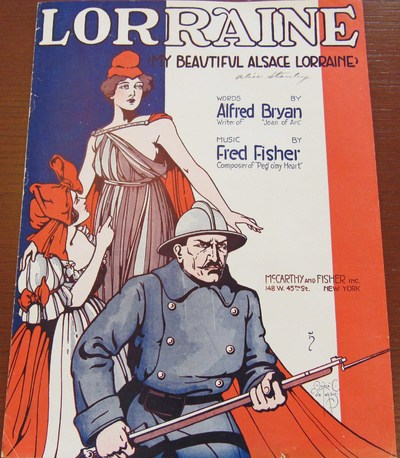

Song
- Released: 1917
- Label: McCarthy and Fisher, Inc.
- Songwriter(s): Composer: Fred Fisher; Lyricist: Al Bryan

"Lorraine (My Beautiful Alsace Lorraine)" is a World War I era song released in 1917. Al Bryan wrote the lyrics. Fred Fisher composed the music. It was published by McCarthy and Fisher, Inc.. André De Takacs designed the sheet music cover. It features a French soldier with his bayonet drawn in the foreground. A woman, who is a symbol of Liberty, and child look on behind him. The song was written for voice and piano.

The sheet music can be found at Pritzker Military Museum & Library.

The song tells the story of a grenadier asleep by a campfire, dreaming of simpler times before the war. Specifically, he recalls times he spent in Lorraine and memories of the "quaint old-fashioned people" who lived in the villages of Alsace-Lorraine. This territory was under German control during the war, but France gained it back after the war. This moment of nostalgia overwhelms him, and he cries out what is the chorus:

Lorraine, Lorraine
My beautiful Alsace Lorraine
You're in my heart forever to remain
I see your village steeple
Your quaint old fashioned people
And I wouldn't care if
I could be there again
Lorraine, Heart of France.
Part of France
Someday when all my worries are through
I'm coming to you, Lorraine
Lorraine, O, welcome me home once again.
to live and die in my Alsace Lorraine
