= On the Road to Calais =

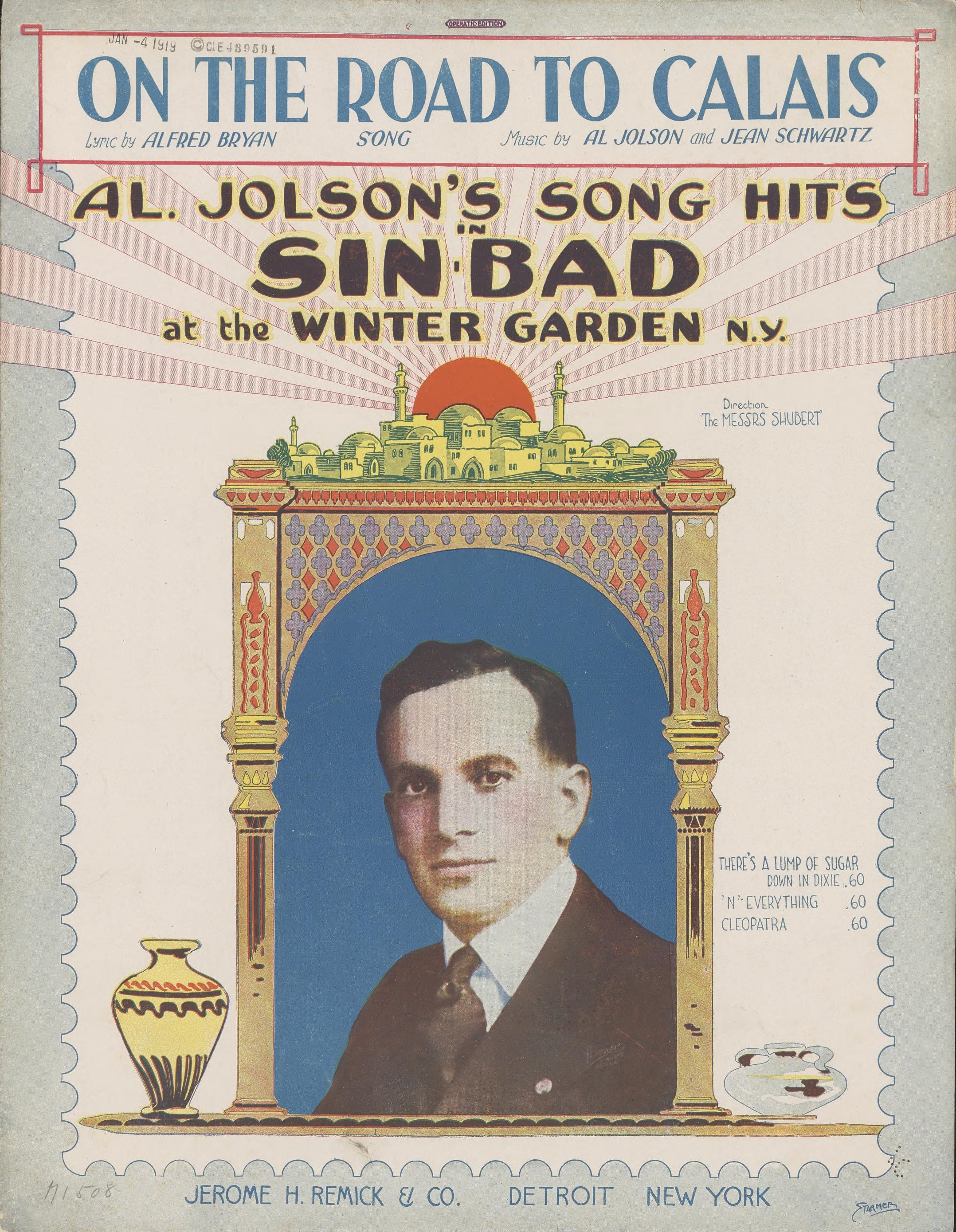
- Sheet music cover, 1918

Song by Al Jolson
- Published: 1919
- Composer(s): Al Jolson
- Lyricist(s): Alfred Bryan

On the Road to Calais is a 1919 song performed by Al Jolson in the 1918 musical Sinbad. The music was composed by Jolson with the lyrics written by Alfred Bryan. It was published by Jerome H. Remick & Co.

Based on sales estimates, the song reached a peak position of No.5 on the Top 100 US songs of its time.
