= Eleonora and Ethel Olson =

Norwegian-American entertainers

Between 1905 and 1925 Eleonora and Ethel Olson were well-known figures in Scandinavian communities throughout the United States. They toured extensively in the Midwest, and their recordings on major record labels gained them a nationwide following.

== Norwegian-American entertainers ==
Eleonora Olson 1917

Ethel Olson 1917

The Olson Sisters were versatile performers, adept at both singing and comedy. They usually worked with a piano accompanist and presented a program of vocal works, piano solos, and comic monologues. Eleonora, a contralto, was the primary vocalist, and Ethel, a soprano, joined her for duets. Their musical repertoire ranged from recital pieces and folk songs to parlor songs and gospel hymns.

Eleonora and Ethel, whose parents were from Norway, portrayed the immigrant's difficulty in adapting to American life. Their story At The Movies touches on homesickness for the Old Country while The Baseball Game recounts a Norwegian woman's misadventures with the national pastime. The Olson Sisters knew their subject firsthand — whether it be a meeting of the ladies' aid, a piano lesson, or a scene witnessed on a train. In The Old Sogning Woman Eleonora used the dialect of her mother's birthplace. Ethel, a native of the Logan Square neighborhood in Chicago, set her monologue The New Bookcase in a store on Milwaukee Avenue, one of the area's busiest commercial streets, while mentioning the locally published Skandinaven.

A magazine article from 1924 relates how Ethel drew upon an incident in real life for her sketch A Norwegian Woman At The Telephone: "One day as a little girl Ethel visited an ice cream parlor. While there her attention was attracted to a woman who had been called to the telephone for the first time in her life. This experience occasioned considerable fright, and a very humorous conversation ensued. A couple of weeks later Ethel was performing before a large gathering in Orchestra Hall; being called upon for an encore, she gave the story."

The same article says of Eleonora: "It is somewhat surprising that Eleonora Olson, who speaks so many different dialects of Norway, was born in Chicago and has never been abroad. Norwegians say that her enunciation and articulation are just the same as a native's.

While on tour the Olson Sisters appeared in small town opera houses, civic halls, churches, and college auditoriums. In the summer, when warm weather made these facilities unusable, they performed in the big brown tents of the traveling Chautauqua. Eleonora and Ethel were perennial favorites with Chautauqua's rural audiences; in 1915, for instance, they were booked for the entire summer season on the circuit.

An article from that same year in Sanger-Hilsen comments on their popularity: "Among the many troupes that visit us out here in the West, Eleonora Olson's takes a leading place. While the others cease operation after one or two seasons, these three ladies return invariably year after year, and one new city after the other is added to their tour. And this is as it should be; for they bring with them much joie de vivre." The article praises the musical talent of the sisters and their accompanist, and of Ethel it says: "Her Norwegian dialect stories can make even the most stiff-necked pessimist crumple with laughter."

The Olson Sisters had many important friends. Among them were the painter Herbjørn Gausta, U.S. Senator Henrik Shipstead and his wife and such leading families of the church as the Preuses, the Stubs, and the Korens. Their friend, singer Annette Yde Lake, was the mother of actress Ann Sothern. After a performance on the road Eleonora and Ethel were often the overnight guests of prominent local citizens.

== Musical roots ==
Eleonora and Ethel came from a musical family. Their brother, Jacob Alexander Bing, sang for many years with light opera companies. Their mother, Johanna, also had a fine singing voice, and the Minneapolis Daglig Tidende credited her with having instilled a love of music in her children.

Eleonora Olson (1870–1946) had been performing for several years before starting her own company in 1909. The Eleonora Olson Concert Trio consisted of Eleonora, Ethel and their piano accompanist Alice R. Walden.

Although she had been a child prodigy, Eleonora did not become a full-time professional singer until in her thirties. She attended Chicago Musical College for two years, but a lack of funds prevented her from continuing her musical training. A 1902 article in the St. Paul newspaper Nordvesten says this about Eleonora: "That she can sing what she sings, in the manner which she does, with only those opportunities she has had, is the best proof of her more than usual gifts . . . Until now she has unfortunately had to give up the thought of devoting herself completely to her art . . . She herself says that she has had to struggle for everything she has become."

In 1905 Eleonora joined the Skovgaard Concert Company, and for the next twenty years she actively pursued a musical career. She was frequently a guest soloist with choirs, glee clubs, and choruses and sang both sacred and secular music.

Ethel (1885–1943) also showed early promise and started her career as a reader (actress) at the age of five. She was an accomplished pianist and won a number of musical scholarships. As an adult, however, her greatest acclaim was as a comedian.

== Luther concert a grand success (excerpt) ==
"The benefit concert for Luther hospital held last night at Fournier’s Academy was without exaggeration one of the most delightful and enjoyable entertainments ever given in this city. There was an immense attendance, the largest probably ever held in that hall. Nine hundred tickets were sold and it looked as if the purchasers were all present. Every seat on the floor was filled, also the gallery and even the stairways.

Miss Ethel Olson followed in her clever and wonderful impersonation. No mere words can do justice to this charming and talented lady and the pen can only exhaust itself in superlatives. Miss Olson is an artist in her line of work. She is the most clever and remarkable impersonator that ever appeared before an Eau Claire audience. She made a tremendous hit. Encore followed encore. The people applauded as if she had just come down from the heavenly choir. She possesses a rich dramatic voice and a charming personality. She exceeds all other impersonators that ever appeared here just as the brilliancy of the sun exceeds the twinkling of the stars."

— Eau Claire Leader May 14, 1908

== Recording artists ==
For nearly two decades the Olson Sisters entertained Chautauqua and Lyceum audiences with a combination of music and comedy. Although their material included Norwegian songs and stories, their programs were typically aimed at mainstream audiences. Ethel might, for instance, sing Home, Sweet Home or recite An Old Sweetheart Of Mine by James Whitcomb Riley.

Things changed when Eleonora and Ethel began making records. On Victor, Edison, Brunswick and Columbia Records they were marketed as Norwegian-American artists and their comic monologues emphasized. Between 1918 and 1923 the sisters recorded fifteen sides as vocalists and thirty-five sides as speakers. Many titles appeared on more than one record label. The Old Sogning Woman and Mabel's Wedding were each released as two sides of a 78 rpm disc.

In 1920 Ethel Olson recorded two monologues for Edison Records that were paired with stories by the famed humorist Cal Stewart. The Chautauqua At Punkin Center by Stewart was backed by Ethel's Laughing Girl Has Her Picture Took. Uncle Josh And The Sailor by Stewart was backed by Ethel's The Larson Kids Go Bathing.

Eleonora Olson recorded Norwegian versions of three popular hymns for Victor: Bliv Hos Mig, Mester (Abide With Me), Jeg Trænger Dig Hver Stund (I Need Thee Every Hour) and Engang Min Livstraad Briste Skal (Saved By Grace).

== Later years ==
Eleonora and Ethel Olson were originally from Chicago, but by the 1920s they and their mother were living in Minneapolis. They stopped touring in 1923 when Ethel married Dr. Reuben M. Pederson.

In 1925 the Olson Sisters published a collection of their Norwegian dialect stories called Yust for Fun. A second edition was printed in 1929. The book had two illustrations that appear to be the work of their friend Herbjørn Gausta. Yust for Fun was republished in 1979 with a new introduction, photographs and biographical information.

Papers including news clippings and published items, programs, recording agreements and photographs of Eleonora and Ethel Olson are available for research at The Minnesota Historical Society. The MHS Library has the 1925, 1929 and 1979 editions of Yust for Fun as well as nine 78 rpm discs recorded by the Olson Sisters. A review of the 1979 edition of Yust for Fun appeared in the Spring 1980 issue of Minnesota History magazine.

== The Snoose Boulevard Festival ==
The Snoose Boulevard Festival was held in the Cedar-Riverside neighborhood of Minneapolis from 1972 through 1977. The event, which celebrated the area's Scandinavian past, also highlighted the careers of Olle i Skratthult (Hjalmar Peterson), Slim Jim and the Vagabond Kid (Ernest and Clarence Iverson) and the Olson Sisters.

== See also ==
- Scandinavian dialect humor
