= I'm Crazy Over Every Girl In France =

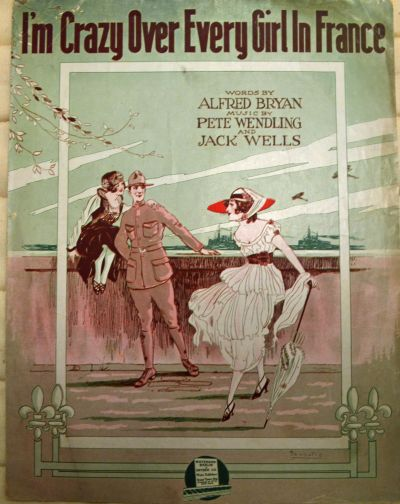
- Sheet Music cover

Song
- Language: English
- Published: 1917
- Songwriter(s): Composer: Pete Wendling & Jack Wells; Lyricist: Alfred Bryan

"I'm Crazy Over Every Girl In France" is a World War I song written by Alfred Bryan and composed by Pete Wendling and Jack Wells. The song was published in 1917 by Waterson, Berlin, & Snyder Co., in New York, NY. The sheet music cover, illustrated by Barbelle, depicts a soldier standing against a sea wall with a woman on top of the wall, her arm on his shoulder watching another girl walking by and features battleships in the background.

In 2011, the song was recorded by Avon Comedy Four for the album Over There!: American Songs and Marches of the Great War - 1917-1918, Vol. 1.

The sheet music can be found at the Pritzker Military Museum & Library.
