= William Tracey =

English footballer (1876–1945)

Personal information
- Full name: William Michael Tracey
- Date of birth: 4 November 1876
- Place of birth: Shrewsbury, England
- Date of death: 24 January 1945 (aged 68)
- Place of death: Shrewsbury, England
- Position: Winger

Senior career*
Years	Team	Apps	(Gls)
1899–1900	Shrewsbury Town		
1900–1903	Bolton Wanderers	56	(9)
1903–1908	Shrewsbury Town		
1908	Chirk		
Total		56	(9)
- * Club domestic league appearances and goals

William Michael Tracey (4 November 1876 – 28 January 1945) was an English footballer who played in the Football League for Bolton Wanderers.

== Personal life ==
Tracey served as a private in the King's Shropshire Light Infantry during the First World War.
