= Fred Fischer =

Austrian photographer (1905–1981)

Fred Fischer in 1955.

Fred Fischer (1905 - 1981) was an Austrian photographer who later lived and worked on Curaçao.

== Biography ==
Fischer was born in Grinzing in 1905. In the 1920s, he worked for German cinematographer, Eugen Schüfftan.

Fischer traveled from Amsterdam to Curaçao in 1938. He created the first photo studio on the island. In 1981, Fischer died in Willemstad.
