= Albert Schatz (musician) =

German musicologist, composer, and librettist

Albert Schatz (1839–1910) was a German music dealer. In 1873 Shatz assumed ownership of the Musikalienhandlung Ludwig Trutschel Nachfolger, a music store in Rostock, Germany. He owned a large collection of libretti due to his passion for operatic history and his plan to write a comprehensive history of opera. His collection came from all around Europe including many German, French, and Italian libretti ranging from the 17th to the 18th century. His plans for the book unfortunately came to halt due his poor health. In 1908 he sold his extensive collection to his friend Oscar Sonneck, the music division chief of the Library of Congress. After Shatz's death, Sonneck also arranged the purchase of Shatz's research papers and notes. Richard Macnutt, writing in The New Grove Dictionary of Music and Musicians (2001), described the Albert Schatz Collection as "the most internationally representative" libretto collection in the world.
