= Alfred Bryan (lyricist) =

Canadian lyricist (1871–1958)

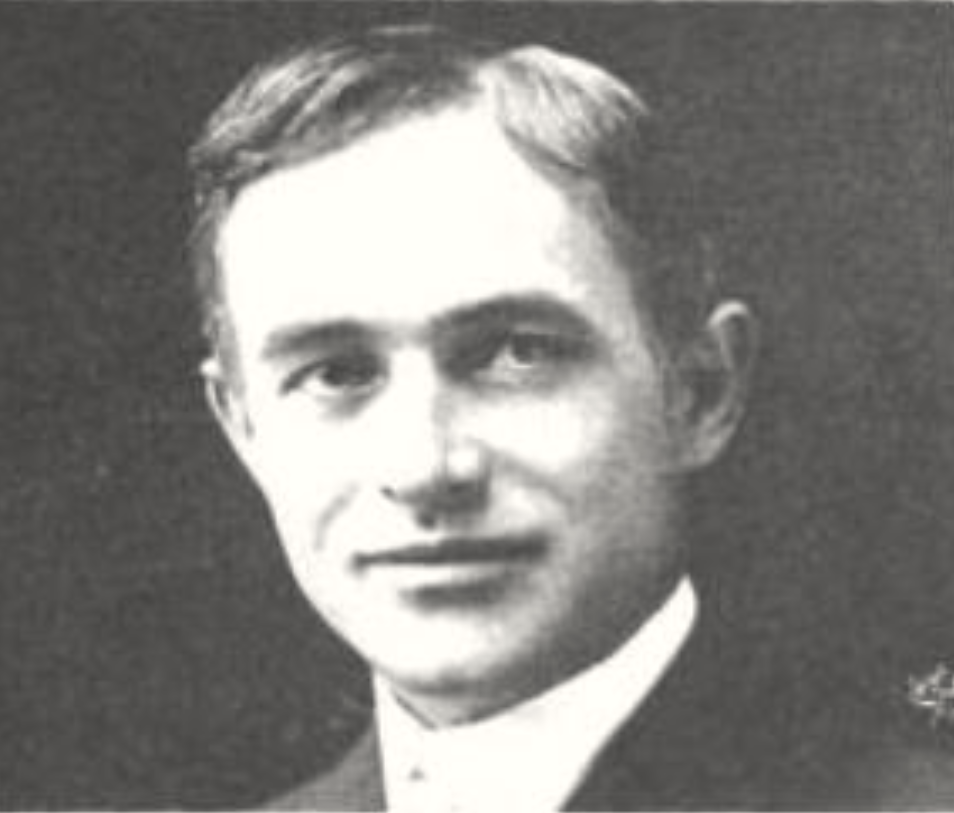
- Born: September 15, 1871; Brantford, Ontario, Canada
- Died: April 1, 1958 (aged 86); Gladstone, New Jersey, U.S.
- Occupation: lyricist

Alfred Bryan (September 15, 1871 – April 1, 1958) was a Canadian lyricist.

Bryan was born in Brantford, Ontario. He worked as an arranger in New York and wrote lyrics for many Broadway shows in the late 1910s and early 1920s; often collaborating with composer Jean Schwartz. In the 1920s he moved to Hollywood to write lyrics for screen musicals.

Bryan worked with several composers during his career. Among his collaborators were Henriette Blanke-Belcher, Fred Fischer, Al Sherman, Larry Stock and Joe McCarthy. Perhaps his most successful song was "I Didn't Raise My Boy to Be a Soldier" (1915), with music by Al Piantadosi. The song sold 650,000 copies during the first three months and became one of 1915's top-selling songs in the United States. Although Bryan himself was not a committed pacifist, he described the American public's anti-war sentiments in his lyrics.

He died in Gladstone, New Jersey, aged 86.

== Musicals ==
- Shubert Gaieties of 1919
- Hello, Alexander (1919)
- The Century Revue (1920)
- The Midnight Rounders of 1920
- The Midnight Rounders of 1921
- Make It Snappy (1922)
- A Night in Spain (1927)

== Songs ==
- 1904 We'll Be Together When the Clouds Roll By (music by Kerry Mills)
- 1906 Everybody Gives Me Good Advice (music by James Kendis and Herman Paley)
- 1909 I'll Do Anything But (music by Henriette Blanke-Belcher)
- 1910 Winter (music by Albert Gumble)
- 1910 Put Your Head Upon my Shoulder (music by Henriette Blanke-Belcher)
- 1910 Come Josephine in My Flying Machine (music by Fred Fisher)
- 1911 My Irish Girl (music by Henriette Blanke-Belcher)
- 1913 Peg o' My Heart (music by Fred Fisher)
- 1913 I'm On My Way to Mandalay (music by Fred Fisher)
- 1914 Who Paid The Rent For Mrs. Rip Van Winkle? (music by Fred Fischer)
- 1914 Down in Waterloo. (m: Albert Gumble & Jack Wells)
- 1914 When It's Night-Time Down in Burgundy. (m: Herman Paley)
- 1915 I Didn't Raise My Boy to Be a Soldier. (m: Al. Piantadosi)
- 1915 When Our Mothers Rule the World. (m: Jack Wells)
- 1916 Don't Cry Dolly Grey. (m: Herman Paley)
- 1916 I Wouldn't Steal the Sweetheart of a Soldier Boy. (m: Herman Paley)
- 1917 Buy a Red Cross Rossie. (m: Harry Tierney)
- 1917 Chimes of Normandy. (m: Jack Wells)
- 1917 Cleopatra. (m: Harry Tierney)
- 1917 Don't Try to Steal the Sweetheart of a Soldier. (m: Van and Schenack)
- 1917 For One Sweet Day. (m: Harry Tierney)
- 1917 Get a Girl to Lead the Army. (m: Harry Tierney)
- 1917 God Save Us all. (m: Harry Tierney)
- 1917 I Want a Good Girl and I Want Her Bad. (m: Harry Tierney)
- 1917 If You'll Be a Soldier I'll Be a Red Cross Nurse. (m: Harry Tierney)
- 1917 I'm Crazy Over Every Girl in France. (m: Pete Wendling & Jack Wells)
- 1917 It's Time for Every Boy to Be a Soldier. (m: Harry Tierney)
- 1917 Lorraine (My Beautiful Alsace Lorraine). (m: Fred Fisher)
- 1917 My Yokohama Girl. (m: Harry Tierney)
- 1917 Over the Top with Jack Wells and Pete Wendling
- 1917 Sweet Little Buttercup. (m: Herman Paley)
- 1917 There's a Vacant Chair in Every Home Tonight. (m: Ernest Breuer)
- 1917 Universal Peace Song God Save Us All. (m: Harry Tierney)
- 1917 Vegetable Song. (m: Harry Tierney)
- 1918 Big Chief Killahun with Edgar Leslie. (m: Maurice Abrahams)
- 1918 Cheer Up Father, Cheer Up Mother. (m: Herman Paley)
- 1918 Come Across, Yankee Boy, Come Across. (m: Fred Fisher)
- 1918 Comprenez-Vous Papa. (m: Ray Lawrence)
- 1918 Girls of France with Edgar Leslie & Harry Ruby
- 1918 Joan of Arc They Are Calling You with Willie Weston. (m: Jack Wells)
- 1918 Mister McAdoo with Joseph McCarthy. (m: Fred Fisher)
- 1918 Oui, Oui, Marie with Joe McCarthy. (m: Fred Fisher)
- 1918 Wee, Wee, Marie (Will You Do Zis for Me) with Joe McCarrthy. (m: Fred Fisher)
- 1918 When Alexander Takes His Ragtime Band to France with Cliff Hess & Edgar Leslie
- 1918 When the Boys from Dixie Eat the Melon on the Rhine. (m: Ernest Breuer)
- 1918 When They Do the Hula Hula on the Boulevard. (m: Ray Lawrence)
- 1918 White House Is the Light House of the World with Irving Caesar
- 1919 I'm Going to Break That Mason-Dixie Line Until I Get to That Gal of Mine. (m: Jean Schwartz)
- 1919 On the Road to Calais. (m: Al Jolson)
- 1920 Hiawatha's Melody of Love with Artie Mehlinger. (m: George W. Meyer)
- 1930 Twenty Swedes Ran Through the Weeds (Chasing One Norwegian) with Billy Moll
- 1932 She Went to Old St. Mary's and He Went to Notre Dame. (m: George W. Meyer)

== Notes ==
- Van Wienen, Mark W. (2002). Rendezvous with Death: American poems of the Great War. University of Illinois Press. ISBN 978-0-252-07059-4.
