= Silver Star (1910 song) =

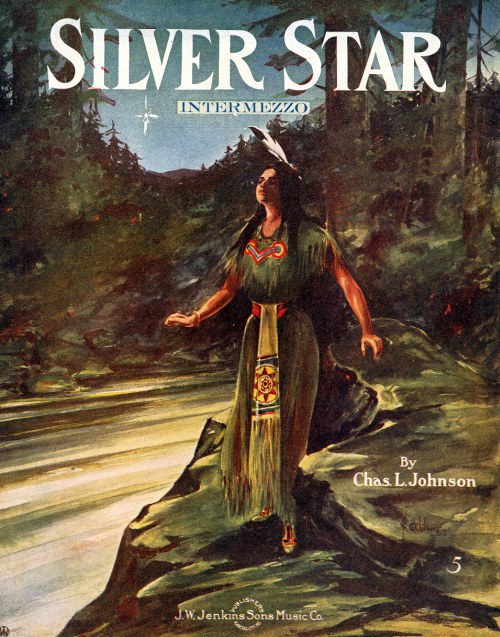
- Sheet music cover, 1910

Composition
- Published: 1910
- Composer(s): Charles L. Johnson
- Lyricist(s): William R. Clay

"Silver Star" is an intermezzo composed by Charles L. Johnson in 1910. In 1911, William R. Clay added lyrics which tell of an Indian warrior eloping with an unnamed Indian maiden whom he refers to as his "silver star".

== Lyrics ==
The lyrics as written by Clay:

There was a dusky little maid in a lonely glade,
Sang a serenade—
Came a warrior true, ev'ry night to woo—
He would softly coo, I love you.
On bended knee so fathfully he would ever be,
Pleading earnestly— be my pretty bride
O'er the prairies ride—be my silver star—

Chorus:
We will be dreaming by campfires gleaming, in lands afar,
Tell me you are, my silver star.
We'll go a creeping while squaw is sleeping, there will be a war,
If we should tarry, my silver Star.
(repeat)

Next morning just a break of day they were far away,
Looking bright and gay—
Chief was feeling blue, knew not what to do—
Where they journeyed to, no one knew.
One day they spied the blushing bride on the prairies wide,
Riding by his side— then he whispered low
She is mine you know— she's my silver star—
(Chorus)

== Bibliography ==
- Clay, William R. (w.); Johnson, Charles L. (m.). "Silver Star" (Sheet music). Kansas City, MO: J.W. Jenkins Sons Music Co. (1911).
- Johnson, Charles L. (m.). "Silver Star" (Sheet music). Kansas City, MO: J.W. Jenkins Sons Music Co. (1910).
