= Cloud-Chief =

1910 intermezzo composed by J. Ernest Philie

- by J. Ernest Philie
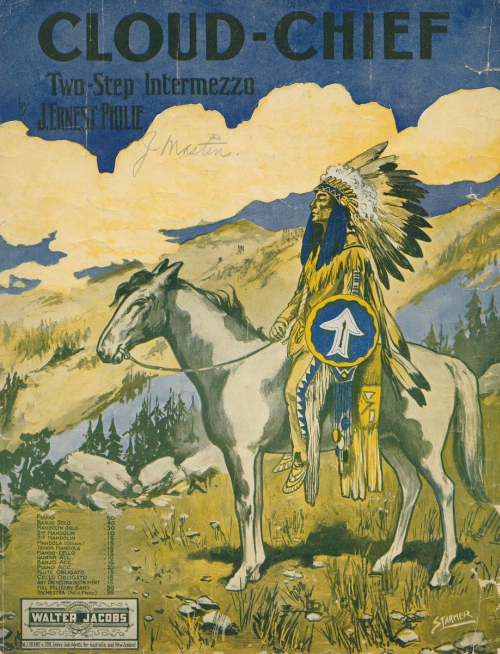
- Sheet music cover (1910)
- Form: Intermezzo
- Composed: 1910

"Cloud-Chief" is an intermezzo composed by J. Ernest Philie in 1910. "Cloud-Chief" was named for the Southern Cheyenne chief of the same name.

== Bibliography ==
- Philie, J. Ernest. "Cloud-Chief" (Sheet music). Boston:Walter Jacobs (1910).
