= Henriette Blanke-Belcher =

American composer of popular music (1882–1958)

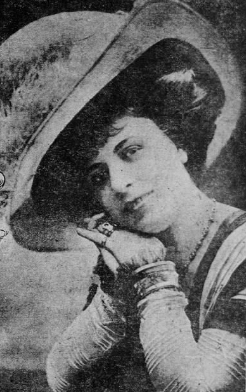
- Henriette Blanke-Belcher, from a 1910 publication.
- Born: Henriette Berger Blanke; February 16, 1882; Kansas City, Missouri
- Died: March 1958 (aged 76); Miami, Florida
- Other names: Henriette Blanke, H. B. Blanke, Henrietta Blanke-Belcher, Henriette Blanke-Melson, Henrietta B. Melson
- Occupation: composer
- Years active: 1900-1918
- Known for: Waltzes and popular songs

Henriette Blanke-Belcher (February 16, 1882 – March 1958), also known as Henrietta Blanke-Belcher and later as Henriette B. Melson, was an American composer of popular music, especially waltzes and ragtime tunes.

== Early life ==
Henriette Berger Blanke was born in Kansas City, Missouri, the eldest of four daughters of Max Blanke and Dora Berger Blanke. Her father was an immigrant from Romania; her mother was from New York City. Henriette was raised in Chicago, and Detroit; her father died in the latter city when she was a teenager.

== Career ==
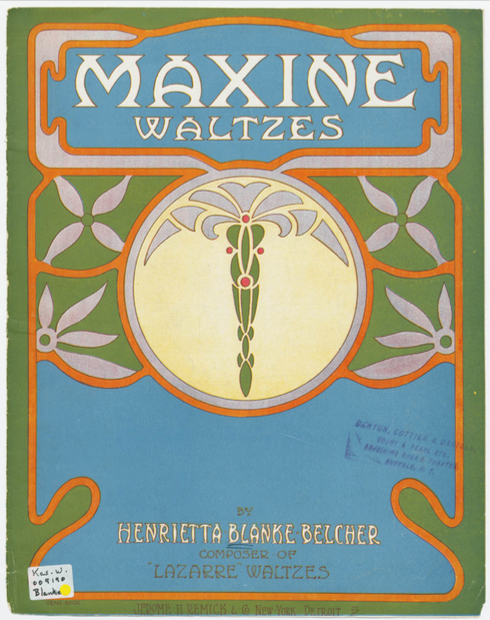
The sheet music for Henriette Blanke-Belcher's "Maxine Waltzes" (1910)

Henriette Blanke worked for Whitney-Warner Publishing Company and Jerome H. Remick, music publishing companies in Detroit. They published many of her compositions. She performed in vaudeville in 1909, and a number of recordings of her compositions were made between 1905 and 1926. "I want to become known as a waltz writer exclusively," she said in 1902, but she also wrote ballads and novelty songs.

== Personal life ==
Henriette Blanke married Frederick E. Belcher, an executive at Jerome H. Remick, in 1905, in Detroit. The couple lived in New York, and had one child, Maxine F. Belcher, born in 1906. They divorced in 1912. She married again in 1918, to a stockbroker, Ralph Melson. She died in 1958, in Miami, Florida.

== Selected works ==
- Lazarre Waltzes (1901)
- Francezka Waltzes (1902, named for the novel by Molly Eliot Seawell)
- Hearts Courageous: Waltzes (1902)
- Cubanola: A Spanish Love Serenade (1902)
- Peggy O'Neal Waltzes (1903)
- My Wigwam Queen (1903, words by James O'Dea)
- Colleen: An Irish Love Song (1903, words by Eddie Dustin)
- My Lady of the North Waltzes (1904)
- Hearts' Haven Waltzes (1905)
- When the Mockingbirds are Singing in the Wild Wood (1906)
- Stingy Moon (1906, words by Will Heelan)
- The Enchantress: Waltzes (1907)
- In the Good Old Irish Way (1907, words by Will Heelan)
- I Will Try (1908, words, by B.B. Ellison)
- Marsovia: Waltzes (1908)
- The New Barn Dance (1908)
- Ain't You Coming Out Tonight? (1909, words by Ren Shields)
- Honeyland (1909, words by Stanley Murphy)
- Lonesome Land (1909, words by Bartley Costello)
- Love Dreams (1910, words by F.J. Crawford)
- Maxine: Valse (1910, named for her young daughter)
- Put Your Head Upon by Shoulder (1910, words by Alfred Bryan)
- Just as Long as the Swanee Flows (1911)
- My Irish Girl (1911, words by Alfred Bryan)
- My Only One (1911, words by William Parquet)
- Polaire Waltzes (1912)
- Loyalty Waltz (1918)
