= T-Bone Slim =

American journalist (1880–1942)

- Matti Valentin Huhta (T-Bone Slim), c. 1902-12
- Born: Matti Valentin Huhta; February 14, 1880; Ashtabula, Ohio
- Died: c. May 15, 1942 (aged 61–62); New York City
- Occupations: Writer; hobo; labor activist; dock worker
- Spouse: Rosa Kotila
- Children: 4

Matti Valentin Huhta (February 14, 1880 – c. May 15, 1942), better known by his pen name T-Bone Slim, was a Finnish-American humorist, poet, songwriter, hobo, and labor activist, who played a prominent role in the Industrial Workers of the World (IWW).

== Nickname ==
T-Bone Slim was a relatively frequent nickname. In addition to Matti Huhta, the nickname T-Bone Slim was also used by the miner William Vann, the labor organizer Al W. McBride, and various other unidentified individuals, often transients.

== Life ==
Huhta was born in Ashtabula, Ohio, to Matti and Johanna Huhta, Finnish immigrants from Kälviä, Finland. In 1902, he married Rosa Kotila of Ashtabula, with whom he had four children. The marriage ended when the children were young, and he left Ohio in 1912, having no further contact with Rosa or the children.

Huhta worked briefly as a reporter for the daily News-Tribune in Duluth, Minnesota but resigned after an editor "misquoted him and balled up his article" about an Industrial Workers of the World (IWW) mass meeting. According to one account, this was when he joined the IWW or "Wobblies", as they are sometimes called. Huhta contributed numerous articles and songs to IWW publications over a period of twenty years and was widely regarded as one of the union's finest writers. He was a regular columnist for Industrial Solidarity and later wrote for the Industrial Worker and Industrialisti.

According to the Communist Party of Canada organizer Tom McEwan, Huhta briefly lived in Saskatoon, Saskatchewan in the 1920s, where he associated himself as an activist with the Communist Party. McEwan also claimed that Huhta had abandoned the ideology of the IWW, although this is seemingly contradicted by Huhta's later writings.

In addition to his writing, Huhta supported himself in various ways. His experience working on docks and barges around the country had by the mid-1930s garnered him a position as barge captain in New York City.

== Death ==
On May 15, 1942, at 5:45 pm, a patrolman found a body floating near Pier 9 on the East River. The body had been in the water for about four days, and showed no obvious signs of external injury. The case was ruled a drowning, and police speculated that the person had been drunk, fallen in the water, and drowned. The body was identified as T-Bone Slim, but the records do not state who identified it. The body was not claimed, and was buried in a pauper's grave on Hart Island.

== Legacy ==
Following his death, T-Bone Slim became a source of inspiration for the emerging American surrealist movement, and during the 1960s there was renewed interest in his songs when they were sung by activists during the Civil Rights Movement. In an interview, Noam Chomsky cited T-Bone Slim as one of his favorite Wobbly singers.

A number of T-Bone Slim's songs can be found in the Little Red Songbook. Among the best known are "The Popular Wobbly", "Mysteries Of A Hobo's Life", and "The Lumberjack's Prayer". First published by the IWW in 1909, the songbook has never gone out of print. The IWW brought out the 38th edition in 2010 and the Charles H. Kerr Publishing Company has other works by T-Bone Slim in its catalog. For a long time, there were no known photographs of T-Bone Slim, but the cartoon sketch at the head of his column was said to have been a good likeness. However, in 2019 photos of him resurfaced.

The first Finnish translation of T-Bone Slim's writings was published in 2013. In 2025 a new English language collection of Slim's work, The Popular Wobbly: Selected Writings of T-Bone Slim, was co-edited by Owen Clayton and Iain McIntyre, and published by University of Minnesota Press.

Street musician John Westmoreland is the great-grandnephew of T-Bone Slim. Originally from North Carolina, Westmoreland has come to Finland—following his relative's ancestral roots—and has been seen busking on Helsinki's Esplanadi.

== Selected works ==
- IWW Songbook 1920
- Power of These Two Hands 1922
- Starving Amidst Too Much 1923

== Quotes ==
- "Wherever you find injustice, the proper form of politeness is attack."
- "Always keep yourself fit to serve mankind. Watch yourself, do not watch the boss. Never exhaust yourself — there is nothing more disgusting than a man staggering home from work 'dog-tired', helplessly falling into a chair to have his child remove his shoes; then grabbing a hasty feverish supper; saying good-night to his family and rolling into bed half-washed, to repeat the same thing three hundred and twelve times per year, or until sickness puts a stop to his mad career."
- "Tear Gas: the most effective agent used by employers to persuade their employees that the interests of capital and labor are identical."
- Only the poor break laws—the rich evade them.

== See also ==
- Wesley Everest
- Joe Hill
- Frank Little
- Utah Phillips
