= Come Josephine in My Flying Machine =

1910 popular song

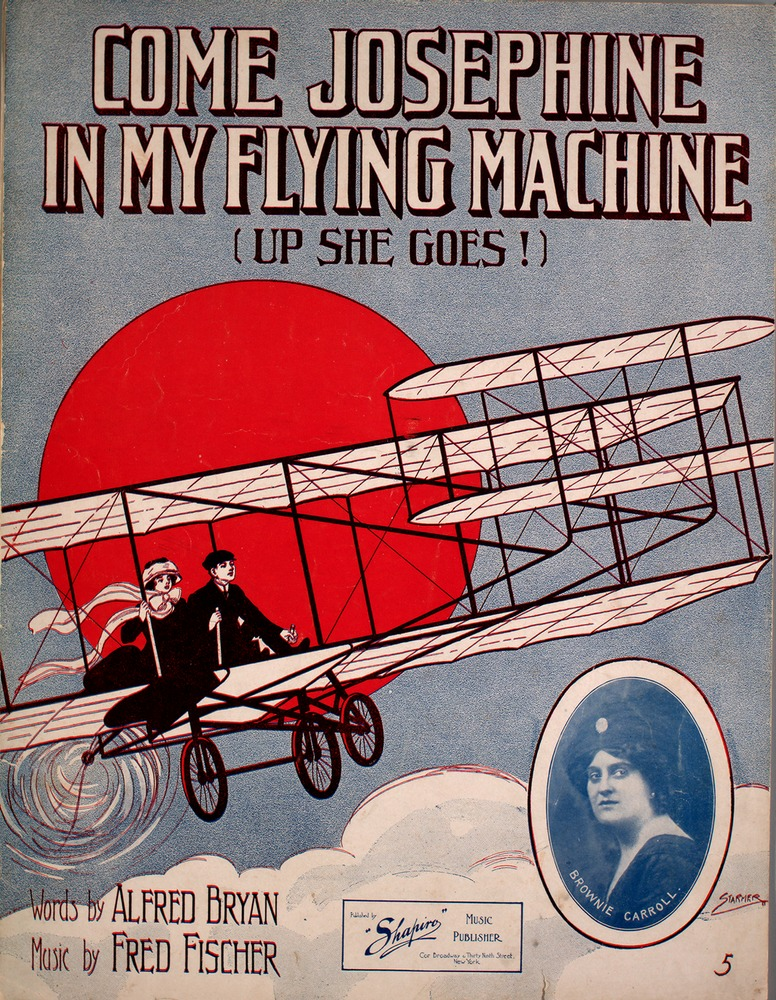
- Sheet music cover, 1910

Song
- Composer: Fred Fisher
- Lyricist: Alfred Bryan

Audio sample
- Recording of Come, Josephine in my flying machine, performed by Blanche Ring (1910): file; help

"Come Josephine in My Flying Machine" is a popular song with music by Fred Fisher and lyrics by Alfred Bryan. First published in 1910, the composition was originally recorded by Blanche Ring and was, for a time, her signature song. Ada Jones and Billy Murray recorded a duet of it in November 1910, which was released the following year. There have been many subsequent recordings of the pop standard.

== Background ==
"Come Josephine" was allegedly based upon Josephine Sarah Magner (April 22, 1883 – July 15, 1966), who was perhaps the first woman parachutist in America with her initial jump in 1905. She was married to early aviation pioneer Leslie Burt Haddock (April 10, 1878 – July 4, 1919), made hundreds of jumps, and assisted Haddock in the building of the first U.S. Army dirigible (Signal Corps Dirigible Number 1) designed by her uncle Thomas Scott Baldwin.

The song tells of a young man bringing his girlfriend along on a flight on his personal airplane. Written in the early days of aviation, it expresses the technological optimism of the era. For example, the song mentions the couple feeling they could "hit the Moon", a feat which was eventually accomplished less than 60 years after the release of the standard.

== In popular culture ==
- The 1912 Mack Sennett comedy A Dash Through the Clouds features an aviation-obsessed woman named "Josephine", played by Mabel Normand, taking flight with real-life aviation pilot Philip Parmelee.
- The song is performed in the feature film The Story of Vernon and Irene Castle (1939).
- It remained popular enough into the 1940s to be featured in a "Follow the Bouncing Ball" sing-along cartoon and parodied by Spike Jones & His City Slickers.
- The song was also recorded by Benay Venuta for the Broadway musical cast recording of Hazel Flagg (1953).
- The song and its lyrics are featured in the short story "An Old Tune" by Jack Finney, originally published in the October 1961 issue of McCall's magazine.
- It was sung in a Season 8 episode of The Waltons, "The Silver Wings" (1979).
- Fragments of the song are sung a cappella in the movie Titanic (1997), early on by the character Jack (Leonardo DiCaprio) to Rose (Kate Winslet) during the "I'm flying" scene, and later, while awaiting rescue, by Rose; it is also featured in the deleted scene where the characters come back from the Irish party in third class. Moya Brennan later recorded the song for the film's second soundtrack, Back to Titanic (1998).
- It was included as a karaoke piece in The Simpsons episode, The Man in the Blue Flannel Pants (2011), when, in an attempt to stop his boss, Mr. Montgomery Burns, from ruining his party, Homer asks the DJ to play the oldest song he has.
- The lyrics of the song were used as chapter names, and a mantra and common theme in Clive Cussler's novel The Race (2011).
- Fragments of the song were used in a cappella form in the television series Peaky Blinders (2013), season 1 episode 2.
- In the Disenchantment episode "Freak Out!" (2021), a quartet sings the chorus to Bean.
- Episode 4 in Season 3 of I Think You Should Leave (2023) features children in a recital singing the first verse.
