= Fred Fisher =

German-American songwriter and music publisher (1875–1942)

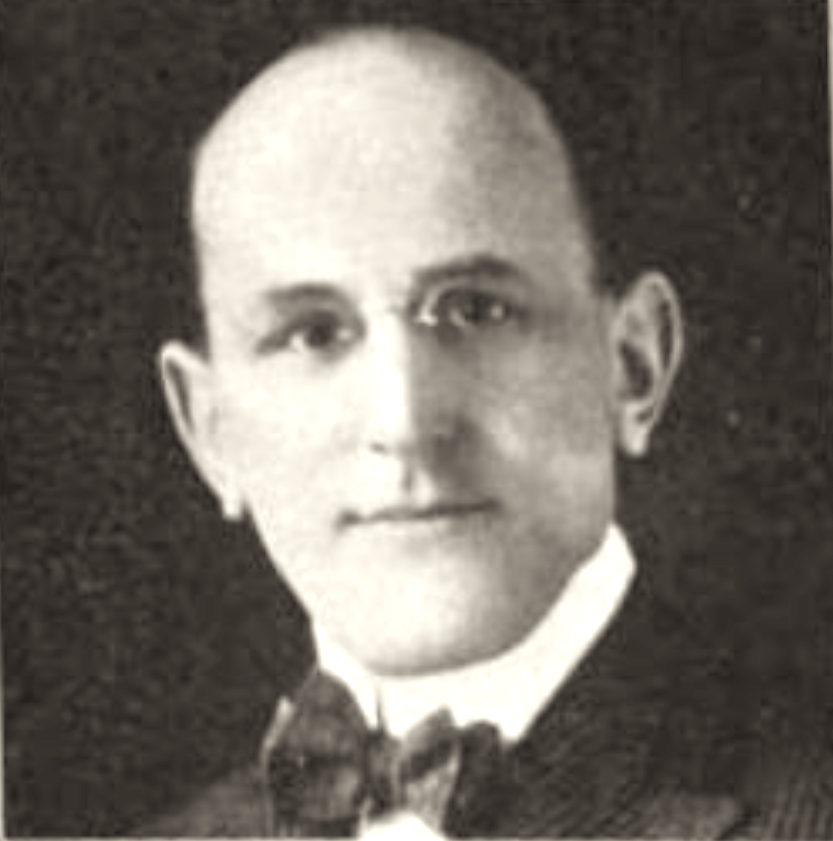
- 1915 photo of Fred Fisher

Background information
- Also known as: Fred Fischer
- Born: Alfred Breitenbach; September 30, 1875; Cologne, Germany
- Died: January 14, 1942 (aged 66) Manhattan, New York, U.S.
- Occupations: Songwriter, music publisher
- Years active: 1900s–1940

Fred Fisher (born Alfred Breitenbach; September 30, 1875 – January 14, 1942) was a German-born American songwriter and Tin Pan Alley music publisher.

== Biography ==
Fisher was born in Cologne, Germany. His parents were Max and Theodora Breitenbach. After visiting the United States in 1892, he immigrated in 1900, where he adopted the name Fred Fischer. He founded the Fred Fischer Music Publishing Company in 1907. During World War I he changed his surname to Fisher to make it seem less German.

In 1914, Fred Fisher married Ana Fisher (née Davidovitch, later anglicized as Davis; born 1896). Their children – Daniel ("Danny"; 1920–2001), Marvin (1916–1993), and Doris (1915–2003) – also wrote songs professionally. Fisher died by suicide in Manhattan, New York, and was interred at Maimonides Cemetery in Brooklyn.

In 1970, Fred Fisher was inducted into the Songwriters Hall of Fame. The Ripley's "Believe It or Not" column credited him with writing more Irish songs than anyone else.

== Selected compositions ==
- "If the Man in the Moon Were a Coon," by Fred Fischer, Will Rossiter (1867–1954) (pub) (1905) OCLC 497077685 (this was his first hit; it combined two then-popular song themes, Moon songs and Coon songs)
- "Come Josephine In My Flying Machine," by Fred Fischer, Shapiro (pub) (1910) OCLC 6586232
- "Peg O' My Heart, words by Alfred Bryan, music by Fred Fisher, Leo Feist (pub) (1913) OCLC 11149171
- "Who paid the rent for Mrs. Rip Van Winkle?" words by Alfred Bryan, music by Fred Fischer, Leo Feist (pub) (1914) OCLC 49782832
- "Lorraine (My Beautiful Alsace Lorraine)" lyrics by Alfred Bryan, music by Fred Fisher, McCarthy & Fisher (pub) (1917) OCLC 13465614
- "They Go Wild, Simply Wild, Over Me," words by Joseph McCarthy (1885–1943), music by Fred Fisher, McCarthy & Fisher (pub) (1917) OCLC 17811063
- "The Popular Wobbly," parody of "They Go Wild, Simply Wild, Over Me," words by T-Bone Slim (1880–1942), Industrial Workers of the World (pub) (1920)
- "Dardanella," words by Fred Fisher, music by Felix Bernard (1897–1944) & Johnny S. Black (1895–1936), McCarthy & Fisher Inc. (1919) OCLC 10206915
- "Chicago," by Fred Fisher, Fred Fisher (pub) (1922) OCLC 20597644
- "That's When Your Heartaches Begin," by William Raskin, George Brown (Billy Hill), and Fred Fisher, Fred Fisher Music Co. (1940) (an Ink Spots tune recorded in 1957 by Elvis) OCLC 46387847
- "Your Feet's Too Big," by Ada Benson, Fred Fisher, The Four Ink Spots (1936) OCLC 497463463
- "I'd Rather Be Blue," words by Billy Rose, music by Fred Fisher, Irving Berlin (pub) (1928) OCLC 25122790
- "Whispering Grass," words by Fred Fisher, music by Doris Fisher, Mills Music Inc. (pub) (1940) OCLC 26008157

Some of his other songs are;

- 1917 "Pull the Cork Out of Erin Let the River Shannon Flow". L: Addison Burkhardt
- 1918 "Come Across, Yankee Boy, Come Across". L: Alfred Bryan
- 1918 "In the Harbor of My Mother's Arms". L: Monty Brice
- 1918 "Little Blue Bonnet Girl"
- 1918 "Mister McAdoo". L:Joseph McCarthy & Alfred Bryan
- 1918 "Oui, Oui, Marie". L: Alfred Bryan
- 1918 "Sink All Your Ships in the Ocean Blue". L: Jack Glogau
- 1918 "Wee, Wee, Marie (Will You Do Zis for Me)". L: Joseph McCarthy & Alfred Bryan
- 1918 "We're All Comrades Now". L: Joseph McCarthy
- 1918 "When Yankee Doodle Sails Upon the Good Ship Home Sweet Home". L: Addison Burkhardt

== Filmography ==
- My Man (1928) Fanny Brice sings "I'd Rather Be Blue", a Fisher-Billy Rose collaboration that was later covered by Barbra Streisand.
- Oh, You Beautiful Doll (1949) This film is a fictionalized Hollywood biography featuring many of Fisher's songs. A Tin Pan Alley promoter (Mark Stevens) turns serious composer Fred Breitenbach (S.Z. Sakall) into songwriter Fred Fisher.

== Gallery ==
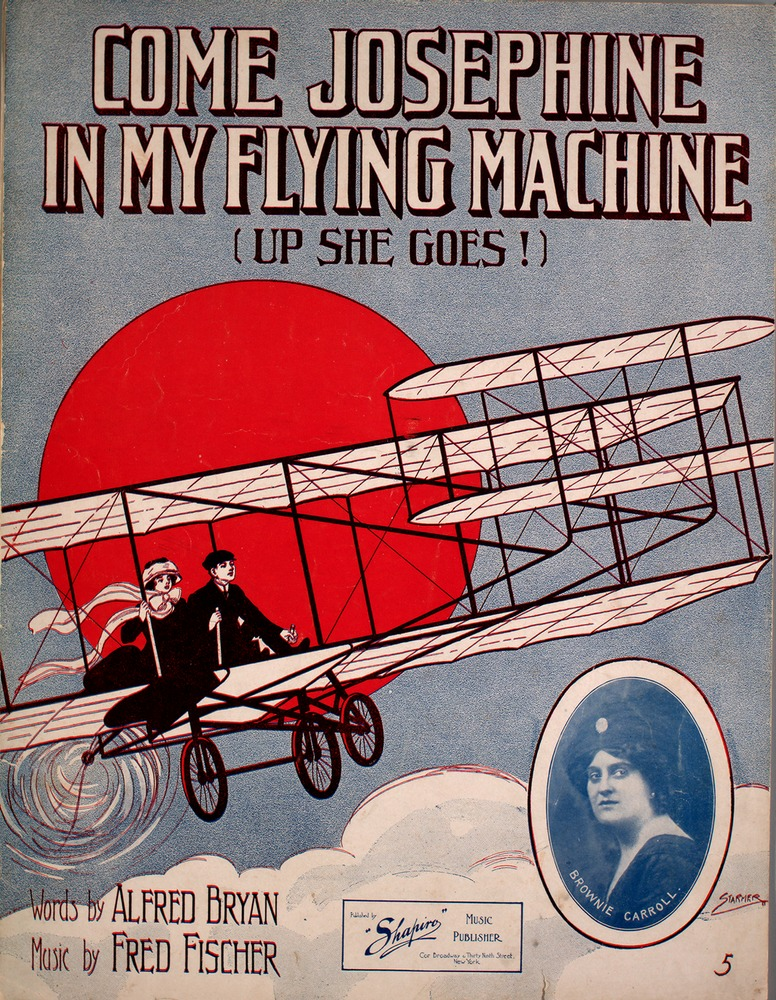
Come Josephine In My Flying Machine 1910

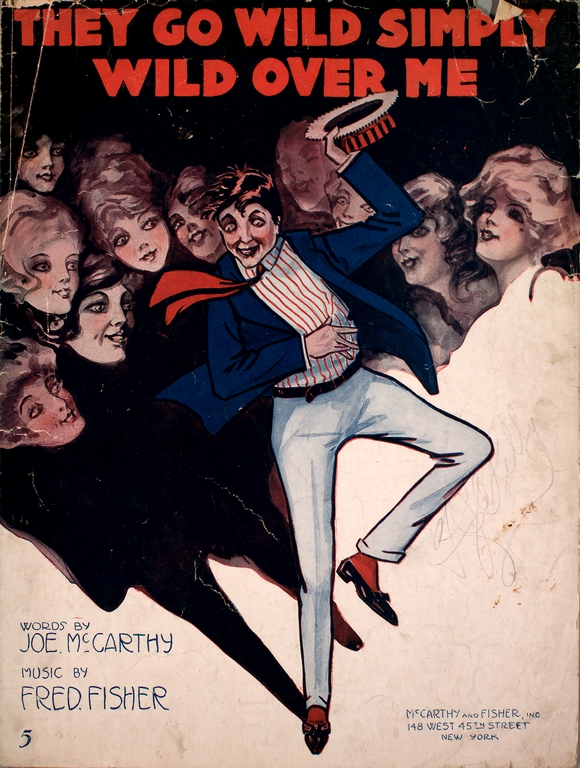
They Go Wild, Simply Wild, Over Me 1917

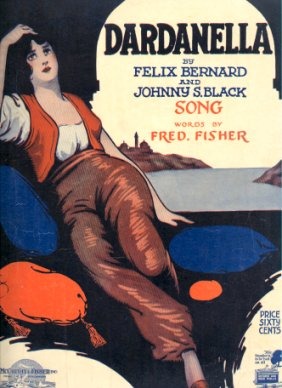
Dardanella 1919

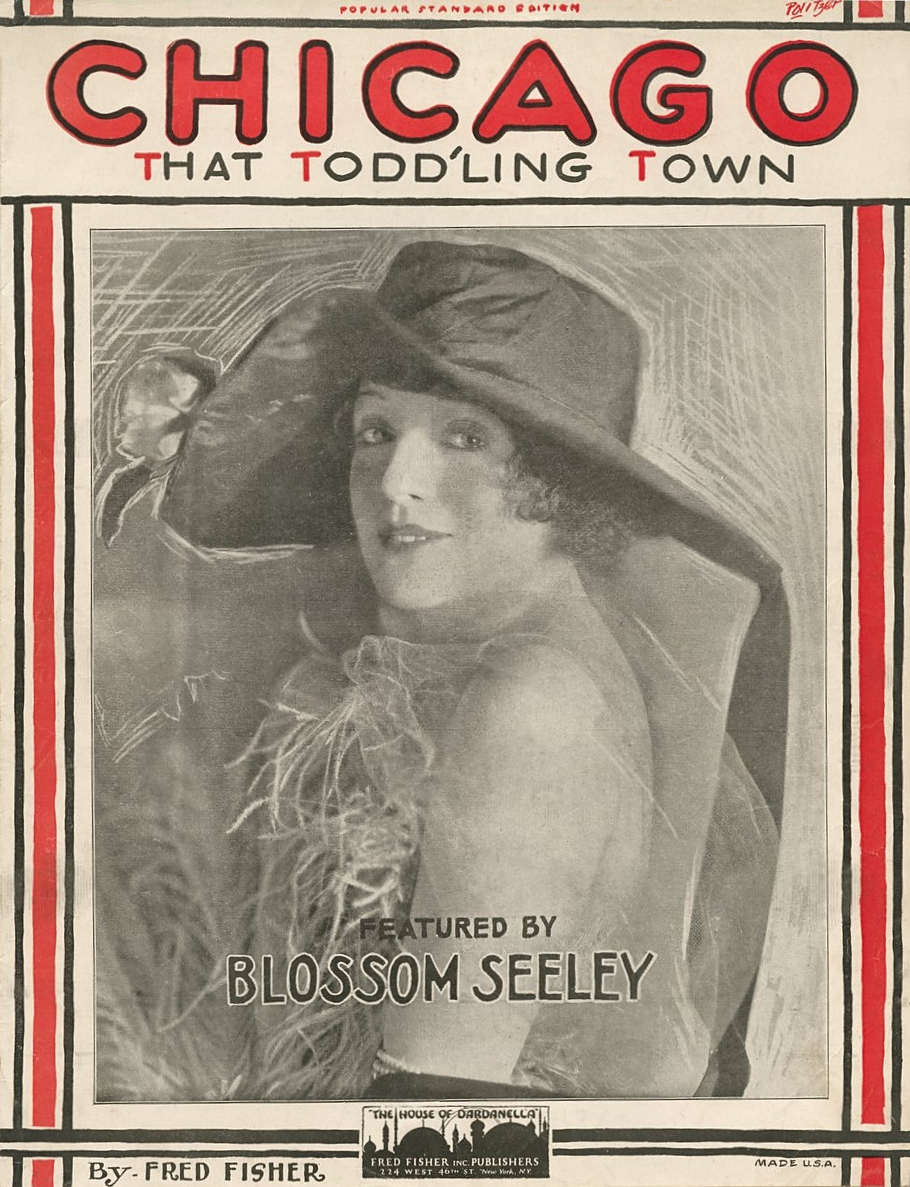
Chicago 1922
