= Charles G. Widdén =

Swedish-American singer and comedian (1874–1933)

Charles Godfrey Widdén (1874-1933) was a Swedish-born singer and comedian, who performed regularly in Worcester, Massachusetts, and New York City during the years 1900 - 1920 and achieved national prominence through his numerous recordings.

== Life and career ==
Charles G. Widdén
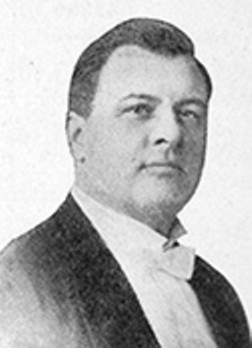
- Born: Karl Gottfrid Widén; September 21, 1874; Stockholm, Sweden
- Died: October 9, 1933 (aged 59); New York City
- Occupation(s): singer, comedian, juggler, chalk talker
- Spouse: Alice Steel

A native of Stockholm, Charles G. Widdén came to the United States in 1888 at the age of fourteen. He settled in Worcester, Massachusetts and in 1891 became an American citizen. In 1901 he married Alice Steel, with whom he had a daughter named Elsie. Although a well-known entertainer, Widdén was primarily employed in industrial and commercial occupations. Government and business records indicate that he was at different times a laborer, packer, machinist, foreman, wire tester and sign painter.

As a young man Widdén began performing as a storyteller, juggler and chalk talker, and by 1900 he was a highly regarded bondkomiker (rustic comic). In 1903 Charles G. Widdén toured Sweden with strongmen Hjalmar Lundin and Aug. W. Johnson. His companions gave exhibitions of wrestling and weight lifting while Widdén demonstrated his talent for juggling and comedy. This five-month sojourn is the only known instance of Widdén on tour in Sweden or America.

Bondkomik (rustic humor) was a popular form of entertainment in turn-of-the-century Sweden. It also had a large following among Swedish Americans. The rustic comic, often clad as a country bumpkin, assumed an alias to go along with his outlandish appearance. Widdén, for instance, sometimes went by the name of Olle ve Kvarna (Olle at the Mill). Hjalmar Peterson was another bondkomiker from Sweden, who was active at the same time and had a similar repertoire. Peterson was better known by his stage name of Olle i Skratthult (Olle from Laughtersville).

In 1916 Widdén moved from Worcester to New York City, where he was already a familiar figure in the Scandinavian community. Proximity to record companies there turned him into one of Swedish America's leading recording artists. He appeared at many types of events: choral concerts, theatrical productions, dances, bazaars, picnics and even wrestling matches — occasionally with fellow comedian Calle Sjöquist. Newspapers proclaimed Widdén the foremost Swedish humorist in America and a noted provider of laughter throughout the land. In 1921 Charles G. Widdén returned to his hometown of Worcester for a concert at Horticultural Hall. Demand for tickets to his Thursday February 3rd program was so great that a second show was added for Saturday February 5th.

After 1920 Widdén made fewer recordings, and his final release came out in 1924. At the same time there were less frequent reports of his activities in the Swedish American press. The San Francisco weekly Vestkusten published word of his death in 1933: "Charles G. Widdén passed away on October 9th at Druskin Hospital in New York City at the age of fifty-nine. He was well known in New York and Worcester as a singer and comedian. The end came swiftly as a consequence of pneumonia. His nearest survivors are a wife and daughter."

In 2016 the Minnesota Historical Society opened an online archive of Swedish American newspapers. These historic publications give many accounts of Charles G. Widdén's live performances and recordings in the years 1903 – 1924. Sometimes billed as "The Hobo Juggler", his first name varies from Charles to Charlie to Chas. to Kalle while his last name is spelled Widdén, Widden, Widén and Wideen.

== Popular recording artist ==
Between 1913 and 1924 Charles G. Widdén recorded over 100 sides for the Columbia, Edison and Victor labels. His output was steady. His new releases came out every single year in this period. Widdén's repertoire consisted of songs, poems, stories and monologues. Other than a few monologues in English he did everything in his native Swedish.

The poetry included several works by the Swedish author Gustaf Fröding, whose lyrics and stories — popular on both sides of the Atlantic — were a staple of rustic humor. Widdén recorded Fröding's poems concerning the supernatural: Bergslagstroll (Mountain trolls) and Skögsrån (The wood sprite) as well as those dealing with immigration to America: Farväll (Farewell) and I bönhuset (At the prayer meeting). Värmland poet Oscar Stjerne likewise contributed to Widdén's repertoire with two poems: Dektarelott (A poet's lot) and Ett unnlit folk (A strange people). J. L. Runeberg's poems of patriotic Finns were also represented: Soldatgossen (The soldier boy) and Sven Duva (a hero of the 1808-1809 war against Russia). These verses were part of Runeberg's epic work Fänrik Ståls Sägner (The Tales of Ensign Stål).

About one third of Widdén's output was spoken word material, and much of his popularity rested on his original comic monologues. Today he is mainly remembered for the yodel-like laugh with which he punctuated these homespun tales. When speaking Swedish he sometimes assumed the comic persona of Olle ve Kvarna (Olle at the Mill). In English he became "Peterson". His 1917 story "Peterson at the Turkish bath" was one of the first Scandinavian dialect recordings.

Charles G. Widdén had a wide-ranging musical repertoire. He recorded over sixty songs — drawing on everything from folk music and vaudeville to musical revues and dance tunes. Most notably Widdén recorded Kostervalsen (The waltz on Koster isle) and seventeen other numbers by Göran Svenning and David Hellström. He also covered songs by Lars Bondeson, Axel Engdahl, Adolf Englund, Gustaf Fröding, Skånska Lasse, Emil Norlander, Theodor Pinet and Ernst Rolf.

Widdén's comic songs often dealt with marital problems. Swedish songs such as Jäntblig (Maidens' glances) and Stackars Olson (Poor old Olson) were joined by American songs in translation: "Lucky Jim" as Lycklige Jim and "Don't take me home" as Mister Johnsons klagan (Mister Johnson's lament). The poem Herre i sitt hus (Master of his house) by Gösta Schönberg was in a similar vein. Regardless of the source, they were cautionary tales of henpecked husbands. Våran bal (Our ball) was a Swedish version of the Irving Berlin hit "Everybody's doin' it now". Although not inherently racist, the Berlin composition was considered a Coon song because of the affected manner in which it was sung by White artists.

Charles G. Widdén made his final recording in 1924, leaving behind an enormous catalog of music and humor. More than ninety years later his records are still sold by vintage music stores and online retailers. In 2011 the Library of Congress opened its National Jukebox web site with streaming audio for eighteen of Widdén's songs and stories.

== Renewed interest in Charles G. Widdén ==
In the 1970s Charles G. Widdén was rediscovered in his native country and in the United States. The Swedish Emigrant Institute of Växjö gave prominent mention to Olle i Skratthult (Hjalmar Peterson) and Charles G. Widdén in a 1973 exhibit on entertainment in Swedish America. A small disc was produced for the occasion with excerpts from their songs and stories.

The Snoose Boulevard Festival was held in the Cedar-Riverside neighborhood of Minneapolis from 1972 through 1977. In the late 19th century Cedar Avenue became known as "Snoose Boulevard", a nickname often given to the main street in Scandinavian communities. The term derived from the residents' fondness for snus (snuff), an inexpensive form of tobacco. The event, which celebrated the area's Scandinavian past, featured the music, food, and arts of the immigrants who had once lived there. The headline performer was Anne-Charlotte Harvey, a singer originally from Stockholm, Sweden. In conjunction with the festival she recorded three albums of folk tunes, emigrant ballads, hymns, waltzes and comic songs. The non-profit Olle i Skratthult Project sponsored the annual celebration and the recordings. Harvey's albums, produced by the renowned ethnomusicologist Maury Bernstein, included six songs from Widdén's discography.

The Swedish singers Gustav Fonandern and Lydia Hedberg toured the United States and made recordings for Columbia and Victor Records during the 1920s. Three of their songs — ones that Widdén had also recorded — were released by the Centre for Swedish Folk Music and Jazz Research on the 1981 LP "From Sweden to America". The album was issued as a CD in 1996 and in 2011 became available at iTunes and Amazon mp3. Recorded in Sweden and the United States between 1917 and 1980, the collection had numbers by Olle i Skratthult, Olga Lindgren, Ragnar Hasselgren and Anne-Charlotte Harvey as well.

== "Peterson's brother-in-law" excerpt ==
My brother-in-law Peterson is the funniest fellow you ever saw in all your life. One night last week he went out to dinner with a friend of his by the name of Carlson, and both of them ordered steak. So the waitress served the two steaks on one big platter, and my brother-in-law Peterson was kind of hungry, I guess. Because he made a grab for one of the pieces of steak, and it happened to be the biggest steak that he got a hold of. So Carlson he didn't like that very much, so he said to Peterson, "Say, Peterson, you is not very polite in your table manners. Now if I had taken one of those pieces of steak first I would have taken one of the smaller pieces instead of the bigger." "Well", said Peterson, "you got the small piece of steak. What are you kicking about?!" (laughs)
