= Kalle Nämdeman =

Swedish musician

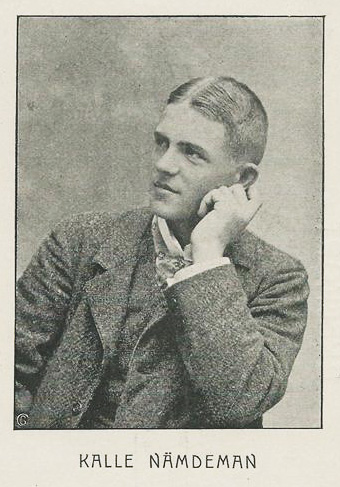
- Born: 31 December 1883; Stockholm, Sweden
- Died: 28 June 1945 (aged 61); Virserum, Småland
- Occupations: songwriter, performer, recording artist

Kalle Nämdeman (31 December 1883 – 28 June 1945) was the stage name of Karl Gustafsson, a Swedish songwriter, performer and recording artist.

== Life and legacy ==
As a young man Kalle Nämdeman apprenticed as a goldsmith, but he eventually began working as an entertainer. He "discovered" the military conscript as a comic type, appearing as such on stage or in top hat and tails. Although he never dressed the part of a bondkomiker (rustic comic), his songs had a similar appeal.

One of the first artists booked on the folk park circuit, by the 1930s Nämdeman was no longer welcome at such venues because of his sometimes improper conduct. His last public appearance was in 1941. He moved to Virserum, Småland, where he lived out his days in straitened circumstances. His statue now stands in Eskilstuna's Folk Park.

In America, his humorous songs were recorded by Olle i Skratthult, who also published them in his songbooks. The most popular of these was Flickan på Bellmansro (The Girl at Bellmansro), a story of unrequited love in Stockholm's Djurgården park.

== Gallery ==
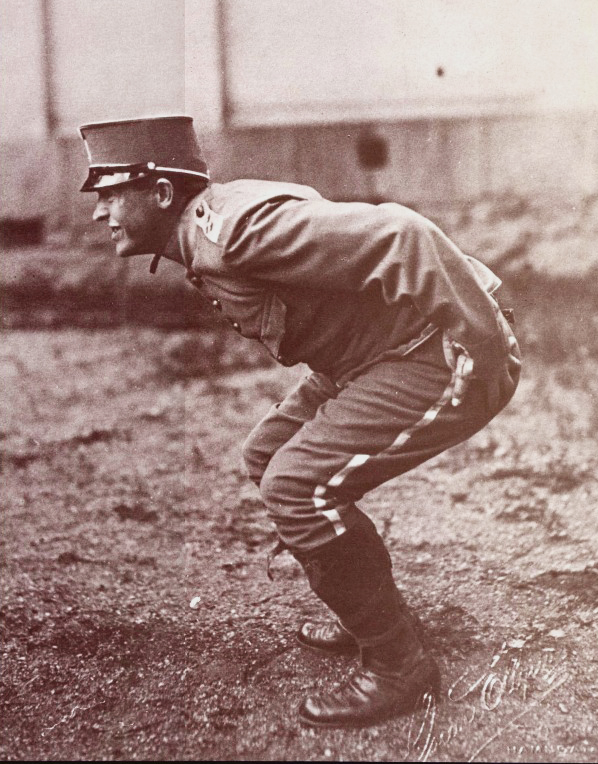
Kalle Nämdeman in military uniform

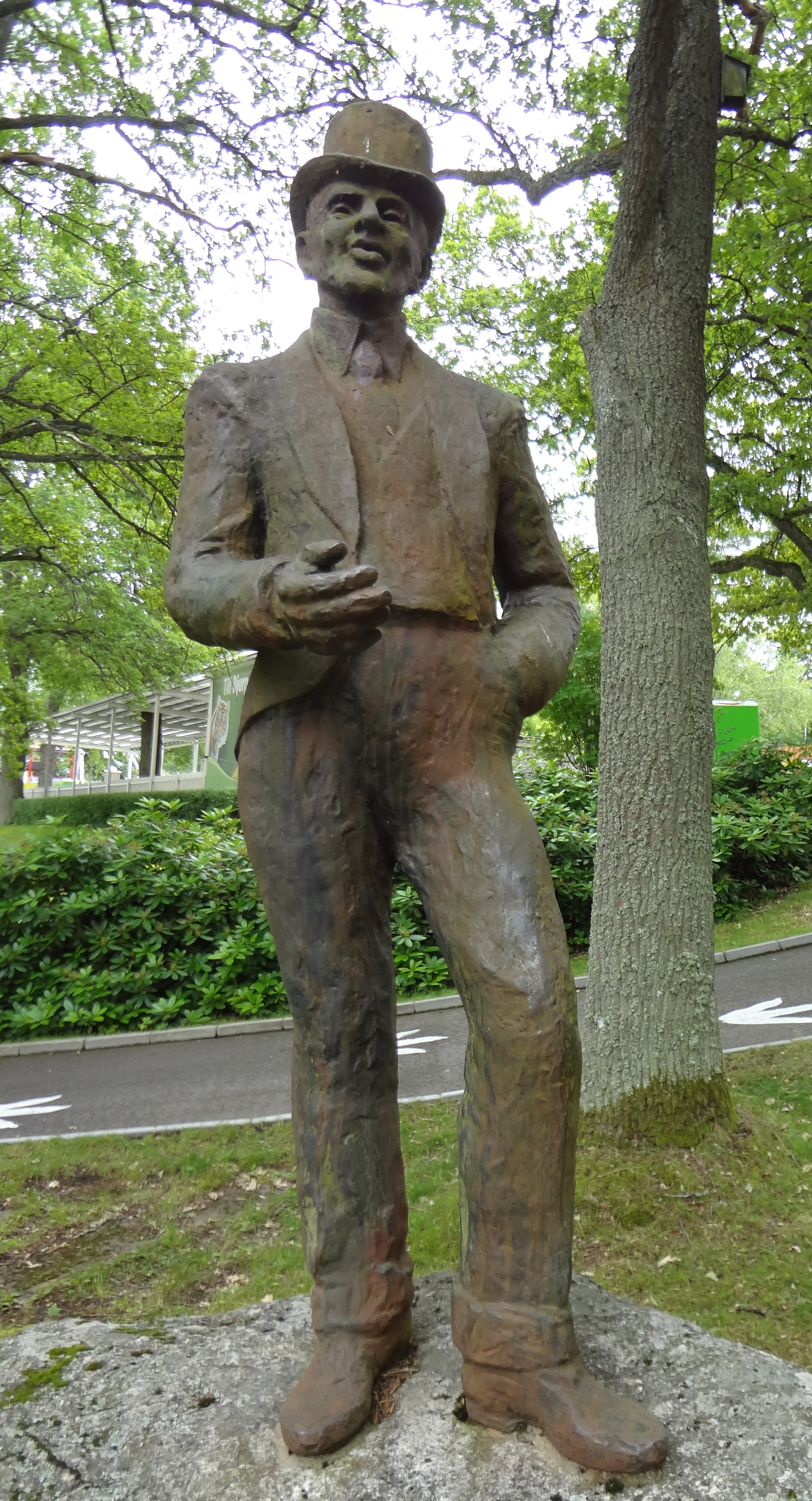
Kalle Nämdeman statue in Eskilstuna

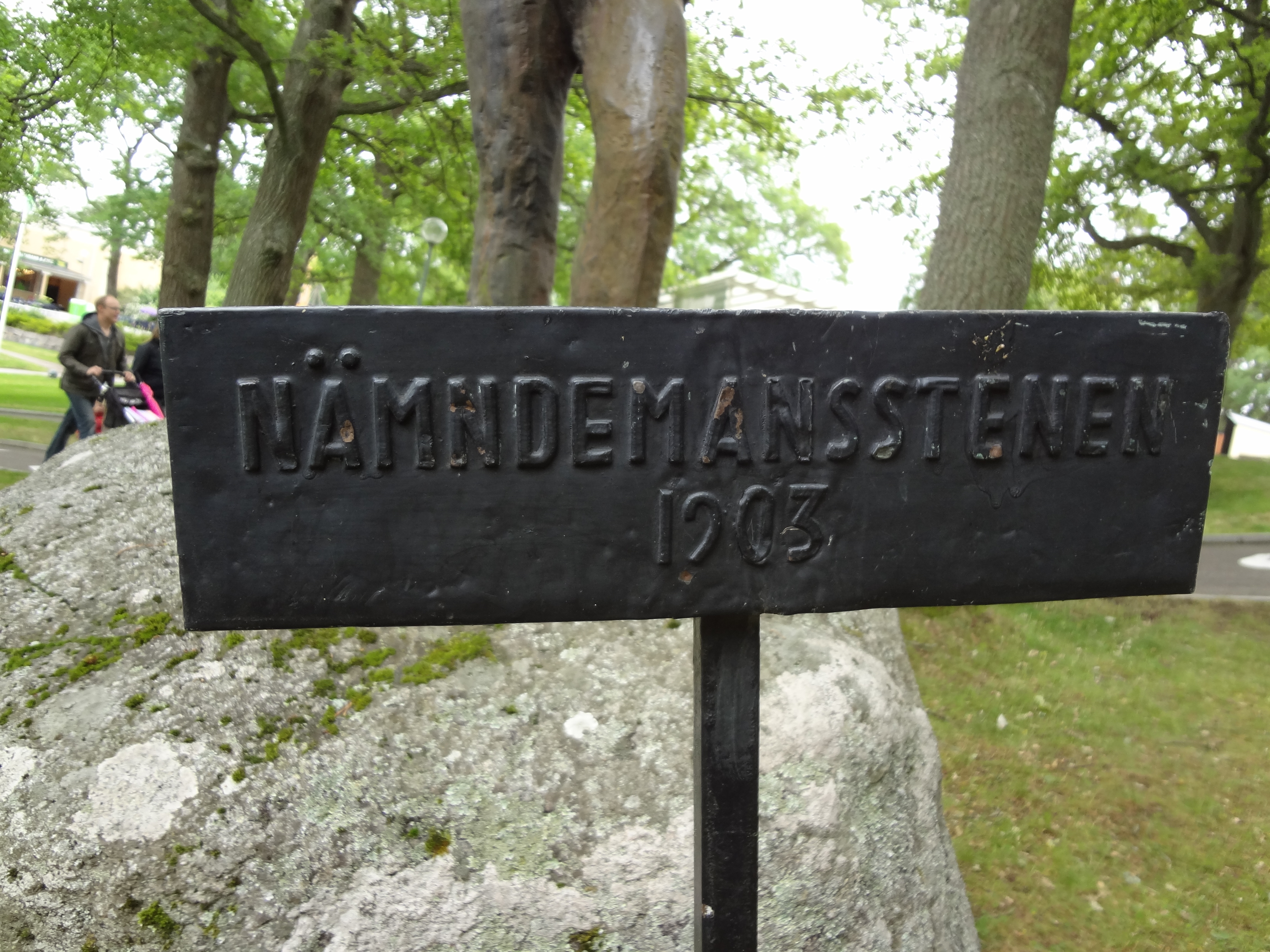
Nämdeman Stone at Parken Zoo

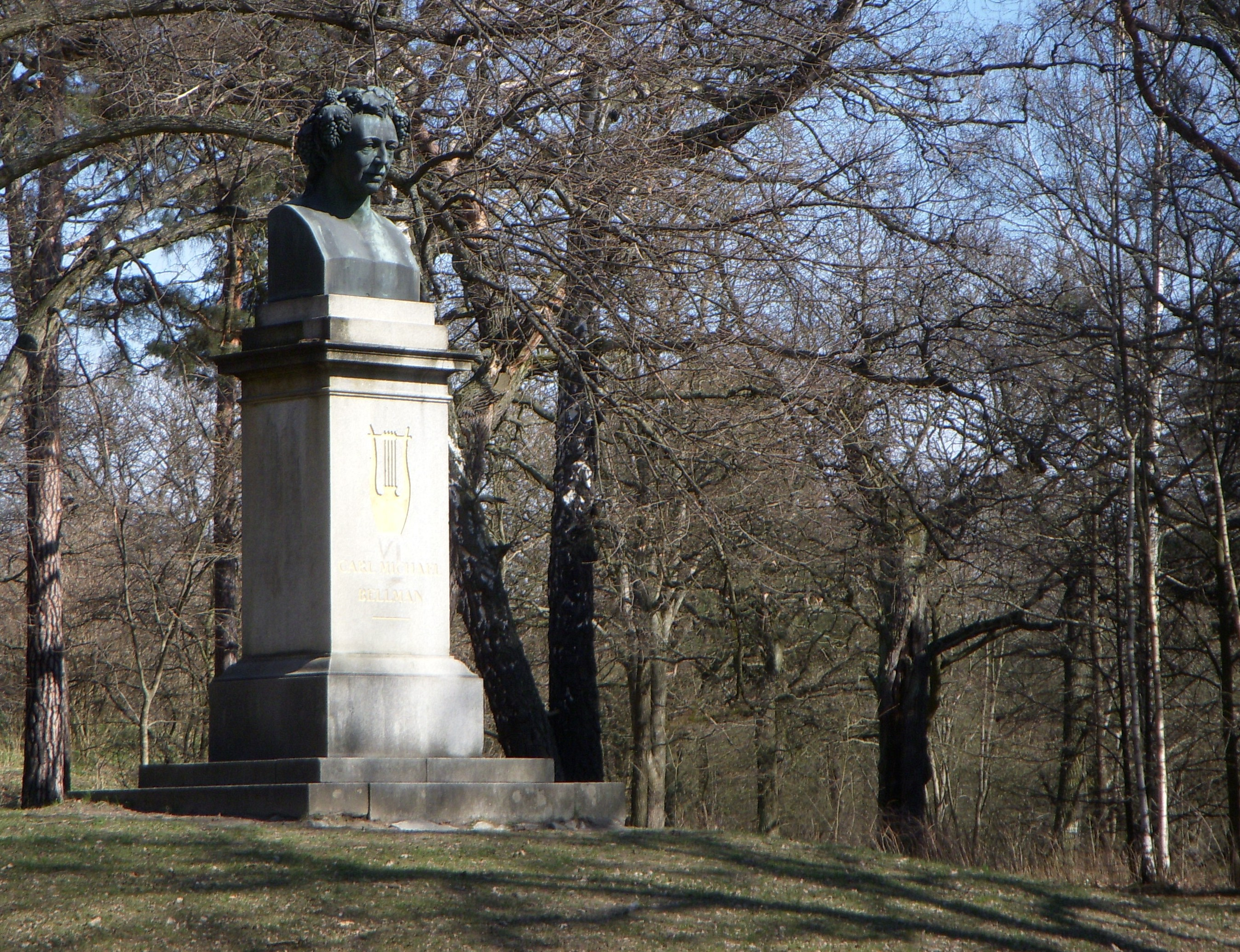
Bellmansro memorial grove at Djurgården
