= Sundquist =

Sundquist is a surname. Notable people with the surname include:

- Alma Sundquist (1872–1940), Swedish physician and gynaecologist
- Axel Sundquist (1867–1910), chief carpenter's mate in the United States Navy during the Spanish–American War who received the Medal of Honor for bravery
- Bjørn Sundquist (born 1948), Norwegian actor, famous for TV, theatre, and movie roles
- Don Sundquist (1936–2023), American businessman and politician who served as the 47th Governor of Tennessee from 1995 to 2003
- Elma Sundquist (1865–1936), Swedish socialist and journalist
- Eric Sundquist, American scholar of the literature and culture of the United States
- Folke Sundquist (1925–2009), Swedish film actor
- Gerry Sundquist (1955–1993), English actor
- Gustav A. Sundquist (1879–1918), ordinary seaman serving in the United States Navy during the Spanish–American War who received the Medal of Honor for bravery
- John Sundquist (1936–2021), the executive director of the Board of International Ministries of American Baptist Churches USA during 1990–2003
- Josh Sundquist (born 1984), Paralympian, a bestselling author and motivational speaker
- Kalle Sundquist (born 1962), Swedish sprint canoeist who competed from the mid-1980s to the early 1990s
- Ragnar Sundquist (1892–1951), popular Swedish accordionist and composer in the first half of the 1900s
- Scott Sundquist, drummer for the grunge band Soundgarden during the mid-1980s
- Ted Sundquist (born 1962), American football player, manager and commentator

== See also ==
- SUNIST
