= Hjalmar Peterson =

Swedish-American singer & comedian (1886–1960)

Olle i Skratthult
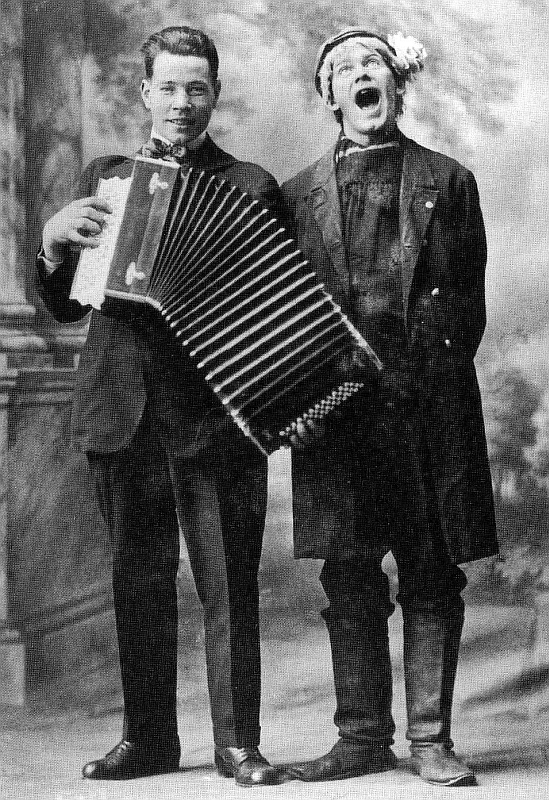
- L to R: Gustav Nyberg and Olle i Skratthult 1916
- Born: Hjalmar Peterson; February 7, 1886; Munkfors, Värmland
- Died: June 24, 1960 (aged 74); Minneapolis, Minnesota
- Occupations: singer, comedian
- Spouses: Olga Lindgren, Mora Grace Engebretson

Hjalmar Peterson (7 February 1886 – 24 June 1960) was a singer and comedian from Sweden, who achieved wide popularity during the 1910s and 1920s. His stage name was Olle i Skratthult (Olle from Laughtersville).

== Life ==
=== Career ===
Hjalmar Peterson was born in Munkfors, Värmland. After emigrating to the United States in 1906 and living in Willmar, Minnesota, for many years, he eventually settled in Minneapolis. At first Peterson worked as a bricklayer in the new country, but before long he embarked on a career as a professional entertainer. In that role he returned to Sweden in 1909 and during a six-month tour gathered the songs, stories and jokes he would later use on stage in America.

Back in America Peterson adopted the persona of Olle i Skratthult and began performing on the Scandinavian-language vaudeville circuit. Olle was a bondkomiker (peasant comic), and he dressed the part with a blacked-out tooth and straw-colored wig. By 1916 he had a touring group, and the following year he married the company's leading lady, Olga Lindgren.

Olle i Skratthult was a full-time entertainer for most of his adult life and for many years was a prominent performer in Scandinavian vaudeville. During the 1920s he toured the country with a large band and was greeted by both ethnic and mainstream audiences. His touring company also had several actors. An evening's entertainment often began with a short play and ended with a public dance. Olle was generally not in the featured work but appeared between acts in olios, during which he told far-fetched stories and sang diverting songs. A full-length theatrical evening was rare unless it was F. A. Dahlgren's musical drama Värmlänningarna (The people of Värmland).

=== A phenomenon ===
"Last night I decided to try to gain entrance to Tuckerman Hall, and since I did not arrive until 8 o'clock, I would not have been able to get in if it had not been for my press pass. I lost two buttons on my overcoat in the melee, but that did not matter, as long as I finally got a seat — that is I had to be satisfied with standing room in the rear. And, I did something I had never done before, and never expect to do again — unless I go to an "Olle-show" — that is I stood on my two tired feet over two hours — and enjoyed myself. There is a lot of complaining to be heard from theatrical people, to the effect that revenue is falling off and that the radio and the phonographs keep the public at home. Well, the Swedish public at least did not stay at home that night. The hall was packed an hour before the time when it was scheduled to start, and hundreds clamored for admittance in vain. A man, who can attract crowds like that in these days, must be a phenomenon. Of course he does not do all the performing himself; he is ably assisted by his lovely wife, Olga, and by some very clever dancers, and a bunch of virtuosos, who make up the Olle i Skratthult orchestra. It is a splendid aggregation of musicians, to say the least, and I need not add that my tired feet forgot their tired feeling as soon as the first strains from the instruments were heard, and I danced with glee until the "Home, sweet home" gave the signal that the show was at an end."

— Burt Maxwell in the Worcester Telegram (MA), reprinted in the Dayton Review (IA)

=== Later years ===
Peterson only performed in Swedish, and as the use of that language declined in America so too did his popularity. As the tours became smaller there were fewer musicians and actors to accompany him. At the very end there was only Olle.

Hjalmar and Olga were divorced in 1933. He remarried, and his second marriage produced two children. Peterson stopped touring and began appearing on the radio. During the 1940s he lived in Marquette, Michigan, where he was the proprietor of a tavern and dance hall. His entertainment career ended with the death of his wife Mora in 1949. Three years later Peterson underwent a religious conversion and joined the Salvation Army. He became a gospel singer and once again drew large crowds, this time with a program of old favorite hymns. He died in Minneapolis on June 24, 1960.

== Popular recording artist ==
Between 1916 and 1929 Olle i Skratthult (Hjalmar Peterson) recorded 46 songs, primarily for Columbia and Victor Records. In addition, the Hjalmar Peterson Orchestra recorded 18 instrumental tracks for Victor. Some of the Victor numbers were subsequently released on the company's low-priced Bluebird label. Columbia and Victor always listed Olle under both his real name and his stage name. Some records gave Hjalmar Peterson top billing. Others gave precedence to Olle i Skratthult. Instrumentals were credited to Olle i Skratthults Luffarekapell, Hjalmar Peterson's Hobo Orchestra and to other similar names. Olle's band did not appear on the records, which were made by studio musicians in New York and Chicago. Among the session players were country music singer Carson Robison on guitar and Arvid Franzen on accordion. Ted Johnson, a onetime musician in Olle's company, became a bandleader in the 1930s and made several recordings with his own group. Johnson was, incidentally, the pipe-smoking fiddler in the memorable 1926 photo of the Hobo Orchestra.

As a performer Olle relied on many Swedish songwriters and poets. The most important of these were Lars Bondeson, F. A. Dahlgren, Gustaf Fröding, David Hellström, Jeremias i Tröstlösa, Jödde i Göljaryd, Skånska Lasse, Anna Myrberg, Emil Norlander, Kalle Nämdeman, Ernst Rolf, Göran Svenning and Fred Winter. Best known for his comedy, Olle also had romantic waltzes in his repertoire. He recorded, for instance, Malmö valsen (The Malmö waltz), written by Svenning and Hellström for the Baltic Exhibition of 1914.

Not all of Olle's songs had Swedish roots. Den lustige kopparslagarn (The jolly coppersmith), which Olle recorded three times, was of German origin. Barndomshemmet (My childhood home), which his wife Olga performed, was an adaptation of On the banks of the Wabash, the state song of Indiana. There were other examples of American popular music in Olle's repertoire. Just kiss yourself good-bye in Swedish became Petters olycksaliga frieri (Peter's unlucky marriage proposal). I'm forever blowing bubbles was likewise Såpbubblor (Soap bubbles). Just kiss yourself good-bye was a so-called Coon song, but its racial stereotypes were absent from the Swedish version.

Some of Olle's final recordings were taken from more traditional sources. In 1928 he recorded the folk song Jag gick mig ut en sommerdag (I went out one summer day). The next year he recorded the broadside ballad Hjalmar och Hulda (Hjalmar and Hulda). These sorrowful tales were a departure from his usual lighthearted fare.

In addition to his records Olle i Skratthult published and sold several songbooks. The small pamphlets included songs he had recorded and other material from his live performances. His 1921 and 1922 songbooks are on file at the Minnesota Historical Society.

Olle i Skratthult will be forever associated with the song Nikolina. He recorded it in 1917 for Columbia and in 1923 and 1929 for Victor. It is estimated that 100,000 copies of the song were sold, a remarkable feat for a foreign-language record. Nikolina is the tragicomic story of a couple, whose desire for romantic happiness is thwarted by the girl's autocratic father. The song had a great appeal for immigrant audiences, who strongly identified with the young lovers' plight. An English version, recorded by Slim Jim and the Vagabond Kid (Ernest and Clarence Iverson), introduced the song to the rest of America. Nikolina was inducted for 2020 into the National Recording Registry of the Library of Congress where songs that are "culturally, historically, or aesthetically significant" are selected for preservation.

== Renewed interest in Olle i Skratthult ==
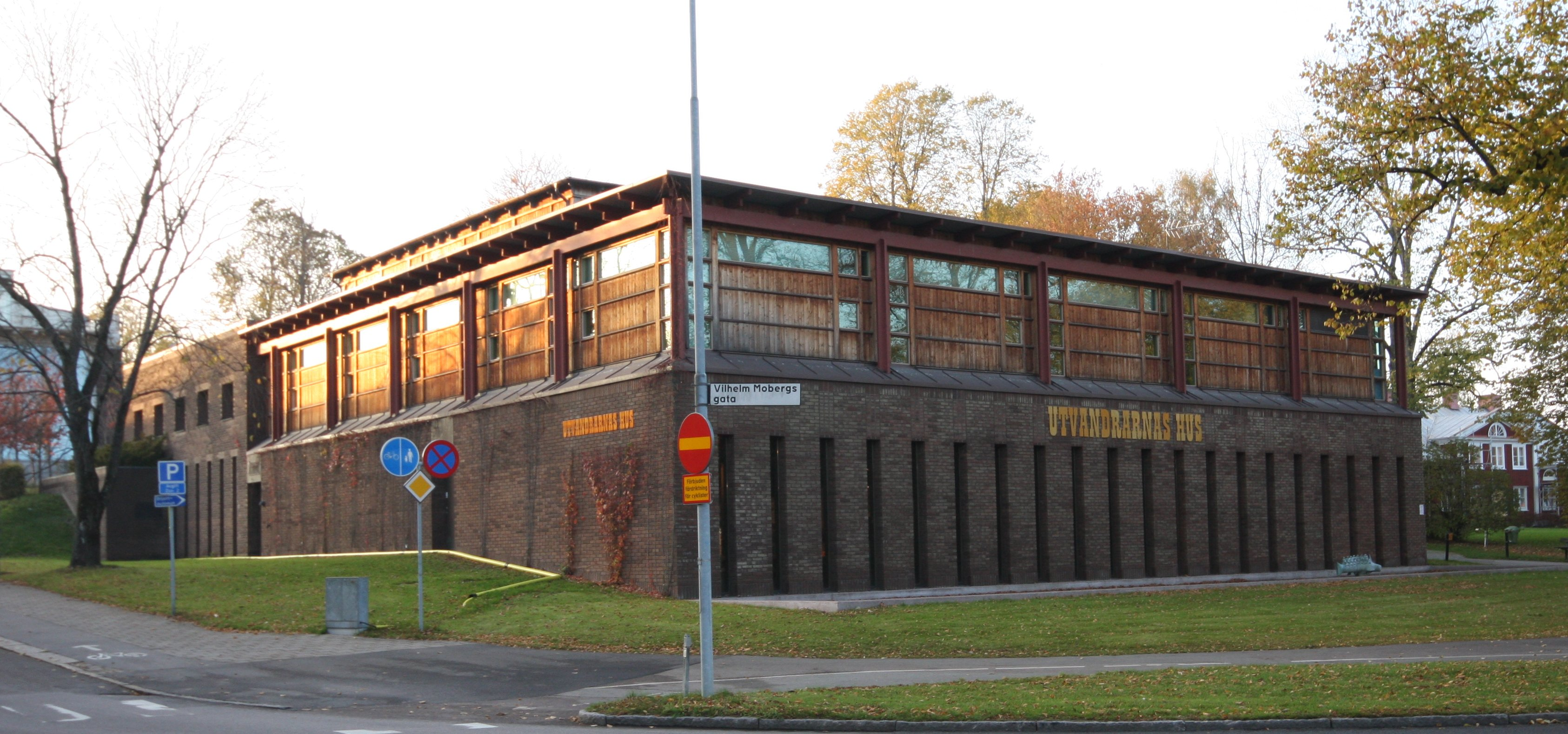
The Swedish Emigrant Institute

In the 1970s Olle i Skratthult was rediscovered in his native country and in the United States. The Swedish Emigrant Institute of Växjö gave prominent mention to Olle i Skratthult and Charles G. Widdén in a 1973 exhibit on entertainment in Swedish America. A small disc was produced for the occasion with excerpts from their songs and stories. The Snoose Boulevard Festival was held in the Cedar-Riverside neighborhood of Minneapolis from 1972 through 1977. In the late 19th century Cedar Avenue became known as "Snoose Boulevard", a nickname often given to the main street in Scandinavian communities. The term derived from the residents' fondness for snus (snuff), an inexpensive form of tobacco. The event, which celebrated the area's Scandinavian past, featured the music, food, and arts of the immigrants who had once lived there. It also highlighted the careers of Olle i Skratthult (Hjalmar Peterson), Slim Jim and the Vagabond Kid (Ernest and Clarence Iverson) and the Olson Sisters (Eleonora and Ethel Olson).

=== Reissues and other recordings ===
In conjunction with the festival the Swedish-born singer Anne-Charlotte Harvey recorded three albums of folk tunes, emigrant ballads, hymns, waltzes and comic songs. The non-profit Olle i Skratthult Project sponsored the annual celebration and the recordings. Harvey's albums, produced by ethnomusicologist Maury Bernstein, included twelve songs from Olle's repertoire. In 1976 the Olle i Skratthult Project reissued two of Olle's most popular recordings as a single: Nikolina and Flickan På Bellmansro.

Banjar Records, a label based in the Twin Cities, released one song by Olle and two by his Hobo Orchestra in 1983. Olle's recordings were released in Sweden as well. The Centre for Swedish Folk Music and Jazz Research had three of his songs on its album "From Sweden to America", which was released as an LP in 1981 and as a CD in 1996. Recorded in Sweden and the United States between 1917 and 1980, the collection had songs by Olle i Skratthult, Olga Lindgren, Gustav Fonandern, Lydia Hedberg, Ragnar Hasselgren and Anne-Charlotte Harvey. In 2011 the twenty-three tracks on the CD were released on iTunes and Amazon mp3.

Twenty years after the first Snoose Boulevard Festival the Great American History Theatre of St.Paul paid tribute to Hjalmar Peterson with its 1992 production "Olle From Laughtersville". During the play's run a souvenir audio cassette was sold with four of Olle's recordings. The illustrator R. Crumb put out a CD in 2000 with some of his favorite vintage recordings. Olle's Hobo Orchestra not only provided one of the tunes but also appeared on the cover in a drawing by the artist.

== Foreword to 1908 songbook ==
Swedes have had the reputation of familiarizing themselves faster than anyone else with the customs and traditions of various countries — to take them in stride.

This book has been published to make "Olle" more familiar to Swedish-American audiences. He devoted all of his time to the theater instead of the current situation where he carries mortar one day and appears on stage the next.

Minneapolis, Minn., Sept. 28, 1908.
OTTO ANDERSON. (Wanderer.)
Anderson was a traveling correspondent for the Minneapolis newspaper Svenska Folkets Tidning between 1899 and 1911; he used the pen names Otto and Viftare (Wanderer) for his reports from various locations.

== Tall tales in 1921 songbook ==
Cat's Eye

My brother, you know, he got a little sick. And so I took him to the doctor. The doctor he said there was something wrong with my brother's eye. So the doctor he took out my brother's eye and put it in a bowl that was sitting on the table. But then something awful happened. The doctor's big cat was in the room too, and she saw my brother's eye lying in that bowl. And the cat — she went and swallowed up the eye of my brother. And I didn't want to say anything, of course, when the doctor didn't say anything. But no sooner had it happened than the doctor turned and saw the empty bowl. And then he said, Where has your brother's eye gone? And then I said, Well, and I laughed and said, the cat swallowed it. But then the doctor got furious and took the cat by the rump and threw her against the wall, and all at once she was as dead as a doornail. Then the doctor took out the cat's eye and put it in my brother, and he was fine and could see fine with the cat's eye. But one time a little later on I was on the front steps at home when the doctor came by. And he said, How's your brother doing? Oh, thank you, Mister Doctor, I said, everything's just fine. He sees real good with that cat's eye. But the worst thing is that now he watches the girls with the one eye, and he watches the rat holes with the other.

First We Ate Up The Cow

Well, the other day when I was out walking, I met my cousin Josef from Muck Meadow. I couldn't understand what was wrong, why he wasn't working, 'cause he'd been working for several years for that big farmer over at Sweet Ridge, so I asked him if he wasn't working there anymore. No, he said, I quit, he said. Really? You quit? I said. Yes, he said, I quit, he said. Oh, I said, but why did you quit? I said. Well, he said, the food got so bad, he said. Really, I said, the food got so bad? I said. Yes, he said, the food got so bad, he said, so I had to quit, he said. You see, he said, first the big cow died, he said, and then we had to eat her up, he said; and then all of a sudden the big sow died, and then we had to eat her up, he said. But, he said, finally the farmer's wife died, he said, and — that's when I quit! he said.
