= Göran Svenning and David Hellström =

Lyricist Göran Svenning and composer David Hellström were a top Swedish songwriting team of the early 20th century. Together they wrote over thirty waltzes, including the classic Kostervalsen (The Koster waltz).

== Göran Svenning ==
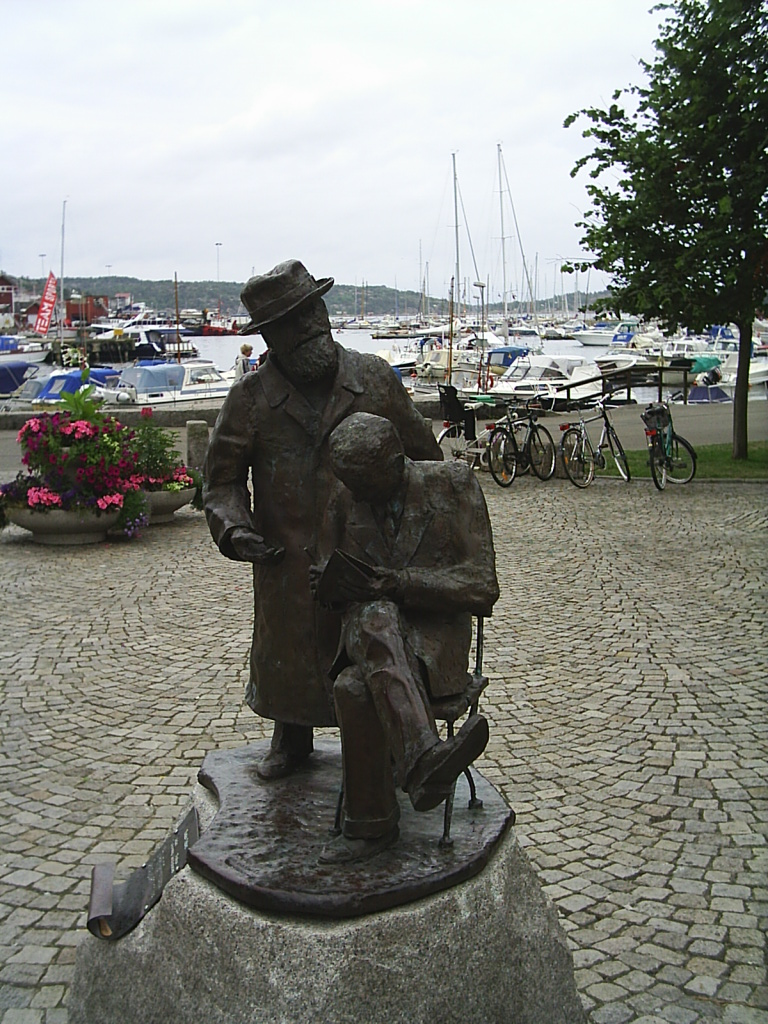
Statue of Svenning and Hellström in Strömstad

Göran Svenning was a songwriter, who was also a dentist. He was born on 6 September 1870 in Ljungsarp and died in Strömstad on 27 December 1953 at the age of eighty-three. A native of Västergötland, he had a dental practice in Strömstad in Bohuslän, where he met the composer David Hellström.

Svenning wrote most of his song lyrics in collaboration with Hellström although he worked with Theodor Pinet on the well-known Bondvals (Farmer waltz). Pinet, a popular bandleader and composer, was known as the “Boston King” because of his association with the Boston waltz, a dance popular in Sweden in the early 1900s.

In 1911 Svenning published a collection of verse entitled Skärgårdssånger (Archipelago songs).

== David Hellström ==
David Hellström was a Swedish composer from the province of Bohuslän. He was born on 23 September 1883 in Strömstad and died there on 7 April 1965 at the age of eighty-one. As a young man he enlisted in the Royal Bohuslän Regiment, where he studied music and played the French horn. He returned to civilian life after attaining the rank of sergeant and from then on worked as a gardener.

After leaving the military Hellström continued with his musical activities, composing both waltzes and marches. He often worked with lyricist Göran Svenning. In 1907 the two men submitted Kostervalsen in a Bohuslän contest for the province’s best new melody. Their entry was disqualified when the jury ruled it was “too suggestive”. Despite the setback, the partnership endured and produced many memorable songs.

In 1962 David Hellström was awarded the Fred Winter prize for his contributions to Swedish music.

== Compositions ==
In America works by Svenning and Hellström appeared on the Columbia, Edison and Victor labels and were covered by such artists as Arvid Franzen, Lydia Hedberg, Eddie Jahrl, John Lager, Ingeborg Laudon, Eric Olson, Hjalmar Peterson and Charles G. Widdén.

The song Friarevalsen (The suitor’s waltz) was given a second life when the producer Emil Norlander borrowed its melody for his revue "Tokiga Amelie" (Crazy Amelie). Norlander, who was a prolific songwriter, wrote new words for the song and called it Balen på bakgården (The dance in the back yard).

In 1914 Svenning and Hellström wrote Malmö valsen (The Malmö waltz), also known as På Baltiskan (On the Baltic). The piece commemorated the Baltic Exhibition of 1914 that was held in Malmö, Sweden on the eve of the First World War. Hjalmar Peterson and his wife Olga Lindgren recorded the song in 1917 for Columbia Records. The same year Charles G. Widdén recorded Sångvals (Song waltz) for Victor Records. His recording was an adaptation of Malmö valsen. It had Hellström’s melody, some of Svenning’s text and new lyrics that were partly in English.

== Songs by Svenning and Hellström ==
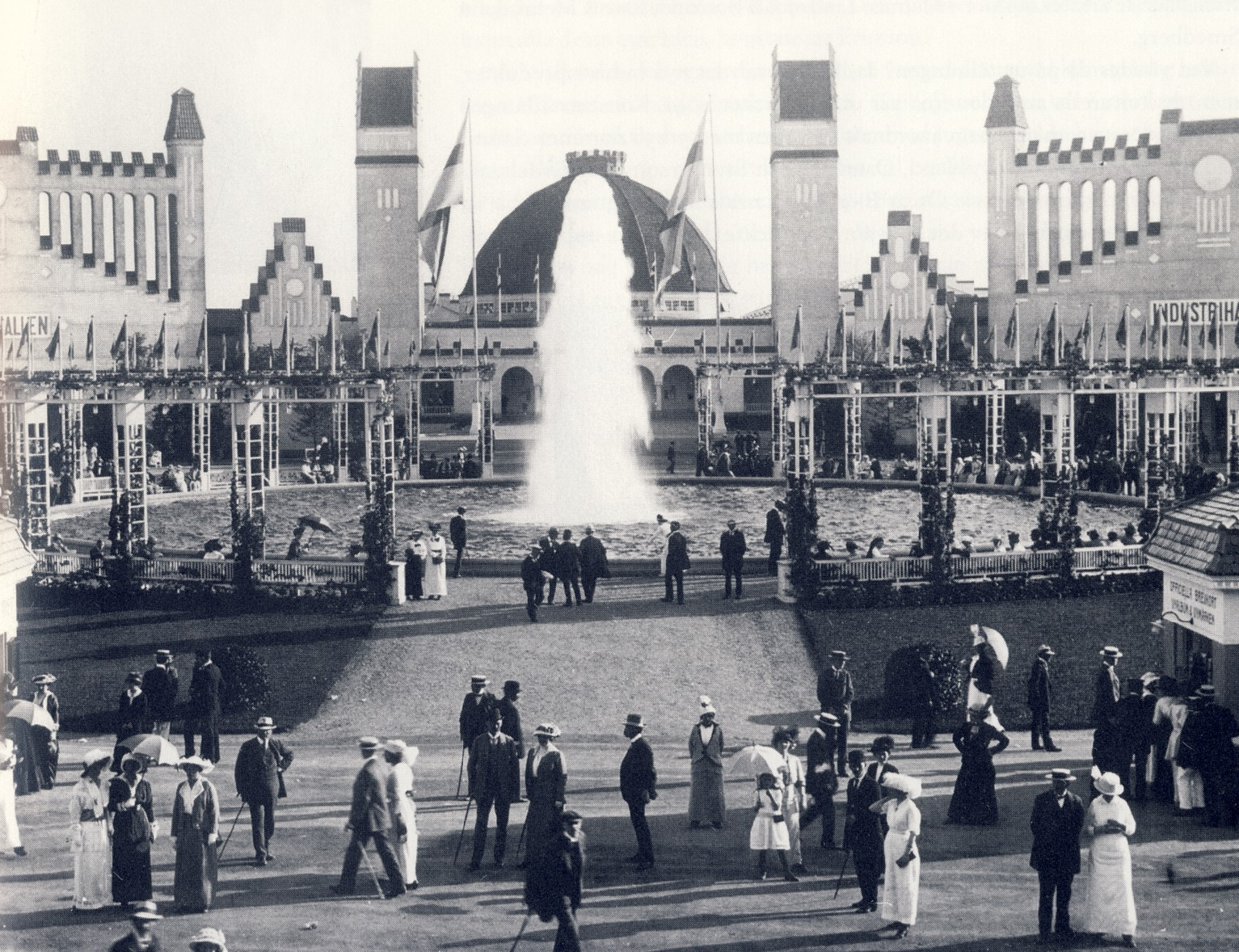
The Baltic Exhibition 1914

- Balen på bakgården / Friarevalsen ~ T: Emil Norlander (1910)
- Beväringsvals (1912)
- Bondvals ~ M: Theodor Pinet (1909)
- Bohuslänska sjömansvalsen (1910)
- Brudvalsen
- Bröllopsvalsen
- Fiskarvals från Bohuslän (1908)
- Friarevalsen (1909)
- Hjärterövalsen (1915)
- I det soliga blå
- Kostervalsen (1913)
- Kyssvalsen (1914)
- Kärestan min
- Landsvägstrall
- Malmö valsen / På Baltiskan / The Baltic Exposition Waltz (1914)
- Midsommarsvalsen
- Ny fiskarvals (1912)
- Nya Kostervalsen
- Stockholmsvalsen (1916)
- Sångvals / Malmö valsen / (1917)
