= Lars Bondeson =

Swedish songwriter (1865–1908)

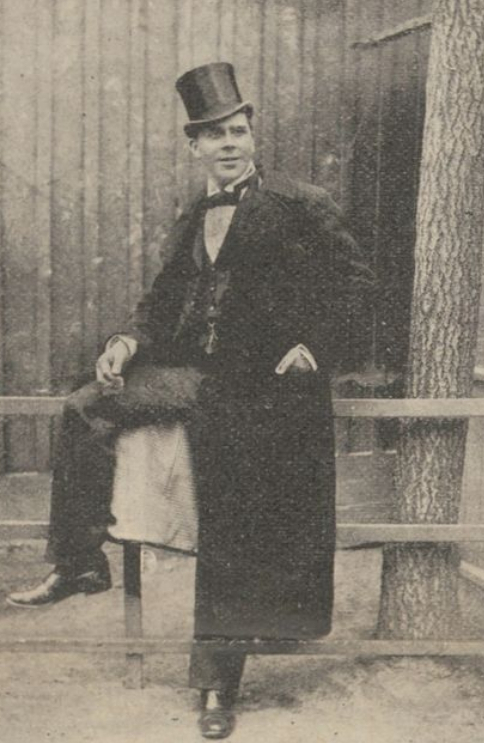
- Sweden’s original rustic comic
- Born: Carl Jansson-Öhlin; 1865
- Died: 1908
- Occupation(s): singer, storyteller, lyricist, music publisher

Lars Bondeson (1865-1908) was the stage name of Carl Jansson-Öhlin, who was one of the founders of Swedish bondkomik (rustic humor). Born in Örebro in 1865, he was a singer, storyteller, lyricist and music publisher. His songbooks were a major influence on countless entertainers in Sweden and America.

== Career ==
Lars Bondeson called himself "Sweden’s original rustic comic". At the same time that Jödde i Göljaryd (Karl Peter Rosén) was establishing the wardrobe and repertoire for a new form of entertainment, he was appearing at the Alhambra Variety Theatre in Stockholm. Bondeson — in contrast to Jödde i Göljaryd — took rustic humor into the world of commercial entertainment via vaudeville, dance halls and folk parks. He collected tunes and songs, which he had discovered or in some cases written himself, and published them in ten songbooks. He died in 1908, having seldom performed in later years. His career in show business had, in fact, lasted only from 1891 until 1895.

Bondeson's songs were recorded in America by Gustav Fonandern, Joel Mossberg, Olle i Skratthult and Charles G. Widdén. The Minnesota Historical Society has his songbooks and other publications to which he contributed in its collections.

== Gallery ==
Lars Bondeson

Gustav Fonandern

Joel Mossberg

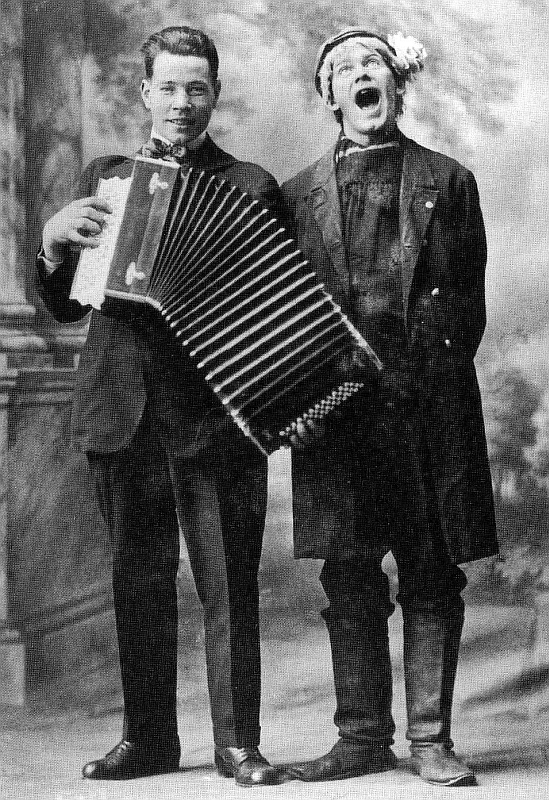
Olle i Skratthult

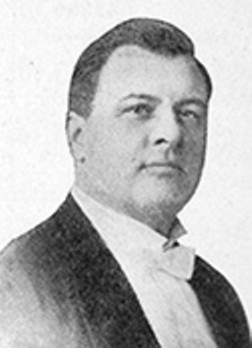
Charles G. Widdén
