= Theodor Larsson =

Swedish songwriter and comedian

Theodor Larsson (1880–1937) was a Swedish songwriter and comedian.

== Career ==
Theodor Larsson

Larsson was born June 8, 1880, in Gylle parish near the town of Trelleborg in Skåne. He died June 30, 1937, in Mjölby. A Swedish bondkomiker (rustic comic) and lyricist, his professional name was Skånska Lasse (Skåning Lasse). He worked as a cabinetmaker in Malmö, then for a short time in Stockholm before moving to Östergötland, where he found employment at a furniture factory in Mjölby. It was during his time there that Larsson embarked on his course as an entertainer. He often performed in a long coat with a flowery vest while playing the accordion. Married twice, he was the father of eleven children, several of whom also became entertainers.

A prolific songwriter, Larsson developed a talent for writing lyrics about topical events. He even found humor in technological advances as his protagonists grappled with electricity, radio and motorized transport. The song Motorcykeln (The Motorcycle) became a hit for the singer Ernst Rolf and was also recorded in America by Olle i Skratthult and Ragnar Hasselgren. Another of his compositions, Josefin mä symaskin (Josephine with the sewing machine), crossed the Atlantic in a version by Bert Leman.

Skånska Lasse made many recordings himself. Sven Svenssons Sven — later recorded by the Swedish-American singers Olle i Skratthult and Charles G. Widdén — brought up the subject of temperance while De rysliga bolshevikerna (The terrible bolsheviks) was a sly piece of political satire. The latter song was recorded in 2009 by the Swedish actor Sven Wollter.

There is one song above all others for which Lasse is remembered, Bonnjazz (Country dance), which he recorded in 1924. The song, one of the best-known works in Swedish popular music, has gone by many names, including Jazz på landet (Dance in the country) and Johan på snippen (Johan on the snippet of land). In America it was recorded by Lydia Hedberg in 1925 and Olle i Skratthult in 1927.

== Johan på snippen ==
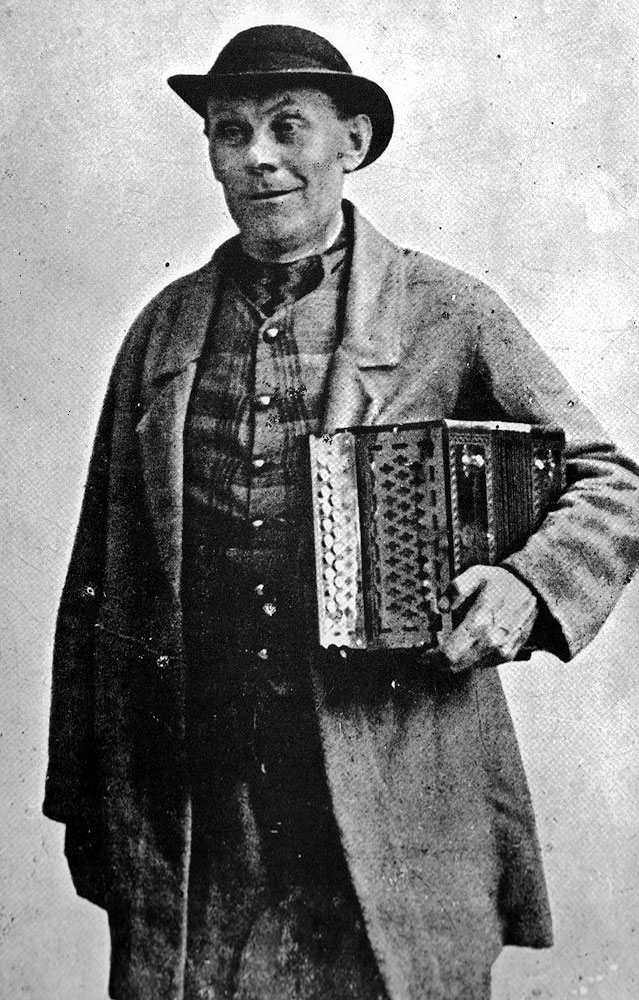
Skånska Lasse

The song commonly known as Johan på snippen was first published in 1922. It had music by Gaston René Wahlberg and words by Skånska Lasse (Theodor Larsson). The two men never met.

Wahlberg, who was an engineer by profession, lived in Örebro in the province of Närke. When the iron industry flourished in the mining region of Bergslagen, people would come to Örebro to do business at Hindersmässan (The St. Henry’s Fair), an annual event which has continued until the present day. Wahlberg used to amuse himself on the piano, and one time after a visit to the local fair he set down some musical impressions. The result was a schottische he called Hindersmässan.

Ernst Rolf purchased the melody from Wahlberg and passed it on to Larsson, who then set about writing suitable lyrics. Hindersmässan was the only melody that Wahlberg ever published, and over the years there has been some confusion about his name. Some have thought the composer to be Gideon Wahlberg, a Swedish songwriter best known for the waltz Svinnsta skär. It was Walter Larsson, the lyricist’s son, who finally tracked down G. R. Wahlberg and saw to it that he received royalty payments for the composition.

Near Skånska Lasse’s home was a cottage on a small plot of land. He based Johan på snippen partly on the neighbor who lived there but also drew upon his knowledge of local customs and folk festivals, having written many such verses before.

Wahlberg’s famous tune has inspired countless parodies, the most notable being Johan på snippens Ford (Johan på snippen’s Ford) with lyrics by Skånska Lasse and Johan på snibbens dammsugsmaskin (Johan på snibben’s vacuum cleaner) with lyrics by Erik Eriksson. Both songs were recorded by Eric P:son Friberg in the late 1920s.

== Selected lyrics ==
- Bonnjazz
- Genom sotat glas
- Josefin mä symaskin
- Nödbroms visan
