= Myrberg =

Myrberg is a surname found in Scandinavia. Notable people with this surname include:

- Anna Myrberg (1878–1931), Swedish author and song lyricist
- Lars Myrberg (born 1964), Swedish boxer
- Pekka Myrberg (1892–1976), Finnish mathematician
- Per Myrberg (1933–2023), Swedish singer
