= Anna Myrberg =

Anna Myrberg (Norberg, May 9, 1878 - Stockholm, April 1, 1931) was a Swedish author and song lyricist.

== Career ==
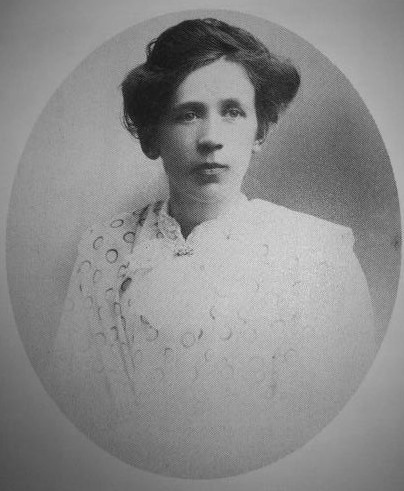
Anna Myrberg

Much of Myrberg's writing appeared under the pseudonym of Svarta Masken (The Black Mask). After training to be a photoengraver, she found work at a photography studio and a Stockholm newspaper. Her debut as a poet was the 1919 collection Svarta Maskens Dårdikter (The Black Mask’s Idiot Poems). She published several volumes of poetry and humor, including two books about Willy Anderson, a boy from the south side of Stockholm. The second of these was filmed as the 1929 movie “Ville Andesons Äventyr” (Willy Anderson’s Adventure). She also contributed articles and poems to the humor magazine Kasper.

Myrberg wrote the lyrics for the well-known songs Lördagsvalsen (The Saturday Waltz) and Livet I Finnskogarna (Life in the Finnish Woods). Her works were recorded in America by Gustav Fonandern, Arvid Franzen, Olle i Gråthult and the Hjalmar Peterson Orchestra. Hjalmar Peterson published her texts in his songbooks. In 1972 the Swedish actor John Harryson recorded an album of old-time Swedish comedy with three songs by Svarta Masken: Bröllopet i Flänga, Lördagsvalsen and Stora fötter.

== Selected lyrics ==
- Bröllopet i Flänga
- Livet i Finnskogarna
- Lördagsvalsen
- Turalleri-Turallera

== Gallery ==
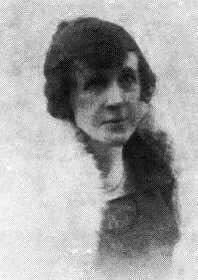
Anna Myrberg

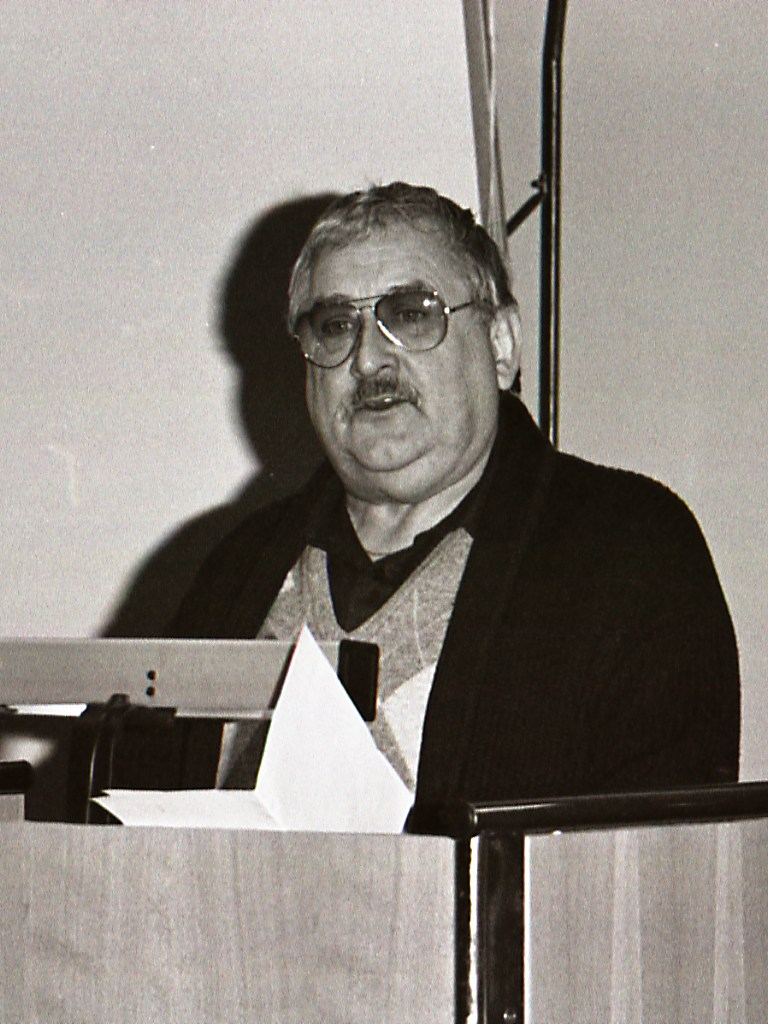
John Harryson

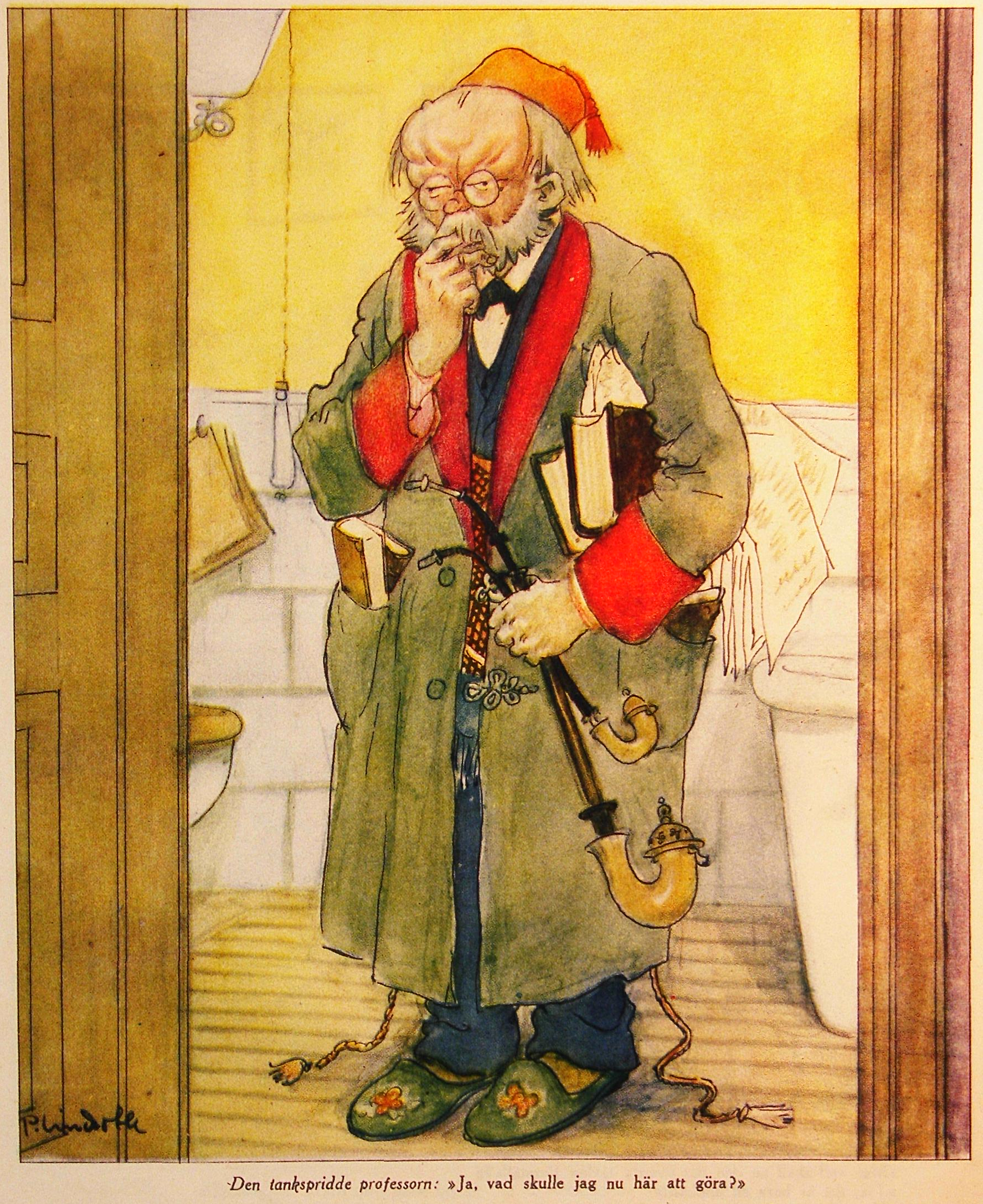
Kasper humor magazine 1929
