= Cigarette girl =

Person who sells or provides cigarettes

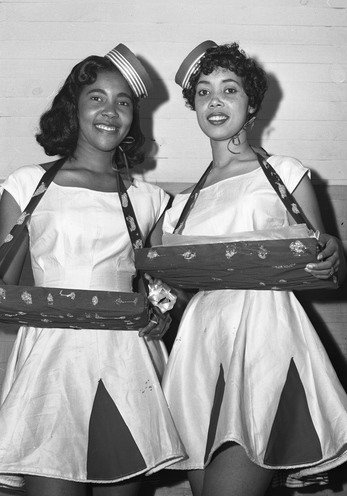
Cigarette girls in Florida in 1956

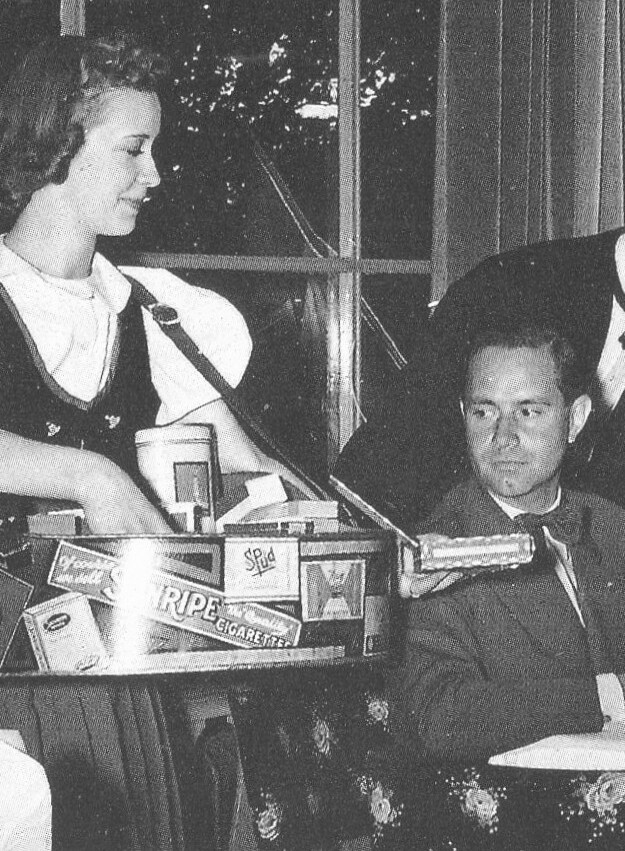
Cigarette girl at the Bellmansro restaurant in Sweden, 1940

In Europe and the United States, a cigarette girl was an attractive young woman who sold or provided cigarettes from a tray held by a neck strap, a common casual occupation until supplanted by vending machines in the 1950s, especially at nightclubs, but also at restaurants, bars, casinos, and other social gathering places. The cigar girl would also sell cigars, and would also peddle other items such as candy, snacks, drinks, and chewing gum from her tray. Her typical charm, wit, and flirtatiousness made her a cultural icon of the time.

== Uniform ==
The most common uniform is a red and black short saloon-style skirt above the knee dress accompanied with a matching pillbox hat, but different colors and styles are possible. Another title for a cigarette girl is "candy girl".

Aside from serving cigarettes and other novelties, the attractive girls acted as eye candy and were often employed to flirt with male customers as well. Cigarette girls usually consented in the hopes of getting tips from wealthy businessmen.

== Popularity and decline ==
The modern image of the cigarette girl developed in the 1920s with the urbanization of the United States. Though largely not seen other than in speakeasies and supper clubs, cigarette girls were frequently shown in Hollywood films and soon became well-established among the general public. The cigarette girl of the nightclub became a staple figure of film and theatre.

With the repeal of Prohibition in 1933, speakeasies across the US closed, and cigarette girls soon found employment in more popular business destinations.

Cigarette girls were a common sight in restaurants, clubs, bars, airports, and casinos in the 1930s and 1940s in the United States. From the end of World War II to the 1950s, cigarette girls further expanded into sporting events and the lobbies of theaters and music halls during intermissions.

With the rise of cigarette machines in the mid-1950s, however, venue owners no longer needed to seek out cigarette girls who worked for a paycheck, and the girls largely vanished from the public eye. There are still some casinos and nightclubs that employ cigarette girls today, especially on the Las Vegas Strip.

== See also ==
- Maid café § Costume and appearance
