= Joel Mossberg =

Swedish-American singer and educator (1870–1943)

- Born: January 30, 1870; Kumla, Närke
- Died: October 15, 1943 (aged 73); Chicago, Illinois
- Occupations: Singer; educator; choir director
- Spouse: Olga Meine

Joel Mossberg (January 30, 1870 – October 15, 1943) was a Swedish-American singer, educator and choir director, who was active between 1900 and 1940.

== Biography ==
Joel Mossberg was born in Kumla, Sweden. After completing his elementary education, he worked as a stone carver in Visby before emigrating in 1892.

In Chicago, Mossberg continued working at his trade, devoting his spare time to musical studies. His fine voice and masterful technique soon made him famous as a baritone of rare ability and secured him the position of soloist at the North Shore Jewish Synagogue and the Sixth Presbyterian Church.

Much in demand for his concert work, he sang in over twenty states throughout the country. He was a choral director and teacher at the Mendelssohn Conservatory of Music in Chicago as well as head of the American Union of Swedish Singers. A member of several fraternities, he held honorary membership in the Orpheus Singing Club and Björgvin Singing Society.

Between 1906 and 1919, Joel Mossberg released over seventy songs on the Columbia, Edison and Victor labels. Many were from the Swedish choral tradition: folk songs, student songs, hymns and patriotic anthems. Literary stalwarts Carl Michael Bellman, J. L. Runeberg and Gunnar Wennerberg contributed to his repertoire. He nonetheless also recorded several comic songs written by the entertainer Lars Bondeson

In 1916 Mossberg released two numbers that Columbia Records described as "Swedish socialist songs". The first one, "Arbetets Söner" ('Sons of the Workers'), is a Swedish labor song from 1885 with lyrics by Henrik Menander. The second one, "Marseljäsen", is a Swedish version of the French national anthem.
