= Emil Norlander =

Swedish writer (1865–1935)

- Born: Emil August Norlander; 5 May 1865; Stockholm, Sweden
- Died: 11 April 1935 (aged 69); Stockholm, Sweden
- Occupations: journalist, author, songwriter, producer

Emil Norlander (1865-1935) was a Swedish journalist, author, songwriter and producer of musical revues.

== Career ==
Originally a dentist, by the late 1890s Norlander was working as a columnist on a Stockholm newspaper. Following this, he became a contributing writer and editor of the humor magazines Nya Nisse and Kasper. He wrote more than twenty books, the most famous being Anderssonskans Kalle (Anderson's Charlie), the tale of a mischievous boy in turn-of-the-century Stockholm.

Starting in 1899, Norlander wrote and produced over sixty revues as well as many popular comedies. His most famous revue was Den förgyllda lergöken (The gilded toy ocarina). He wrote the lyrics for many comic songs, including Fia Jansson and Amanda Lundbom. His New Year's variety shows were held at Södra Teatern, one of Stockholm's most prestigious venues.

After 1920 Norlander's popularity waned as the Swedish public embraced a new generation of entertainers. His last big hit was Den gula paviljongen (The yellow pavilion) in 1923. When the "Revue King" finally retired, he was succeeded by Karl Gerhard and Ernst Rolf.

== Songs ==
During his lengthy career Norlander wrote the lyrics for hundreds of songs, collaborating with Kal Dompan, David Hellström, Arthur Högstedt, John Redland, Max Uyma and other Swedish composers. For some of his songs he borrowed well-known melodies from abroad: Fredssång (Silver Threads Among The Gold), Lycklige John (Lucky Jim) and Kärlek På Italienska Och Svenska (Santa Lucia).

In a rare departure from musical comedy, Norlander penned the lyrics to Fredssång (Peace Song), which begins with the lines: Varför skola mänskor strida, varför skall det flyta blod. (Why should people fight, why should blood flow.) This pacifist anthem, written at the time of the First World War, has been recorded numerous times and published in a variety of songbooks. The singer Sven-Bertil Taube released a memorable version of the song in 1972.

In the 1910s and 1920s Emil Norlander was introduced to Swedish-American audiences through recordings on the Columbia, Edison and Victor labels. Among those recording his songs in America were Ingeborg Laudon, Bert Leman, Gösta Nyström, Elis Olson-Ellis, Hjalmar Peterson, Calle Sjöquist and Charles G. Widdén. Elis Olson-Ellis, the lead actor in several of Norlander's revues, toured the United States during the 1911-1912 season. During his stay he recorded two Norlander songs for Victor Records. Emil Norlander's "Manicuristvisan" (The Manicurist Song), which Olson-Ellis set to music, was later recorded by Calle Sjöquist for Columbia Records.

== Selected revues ==
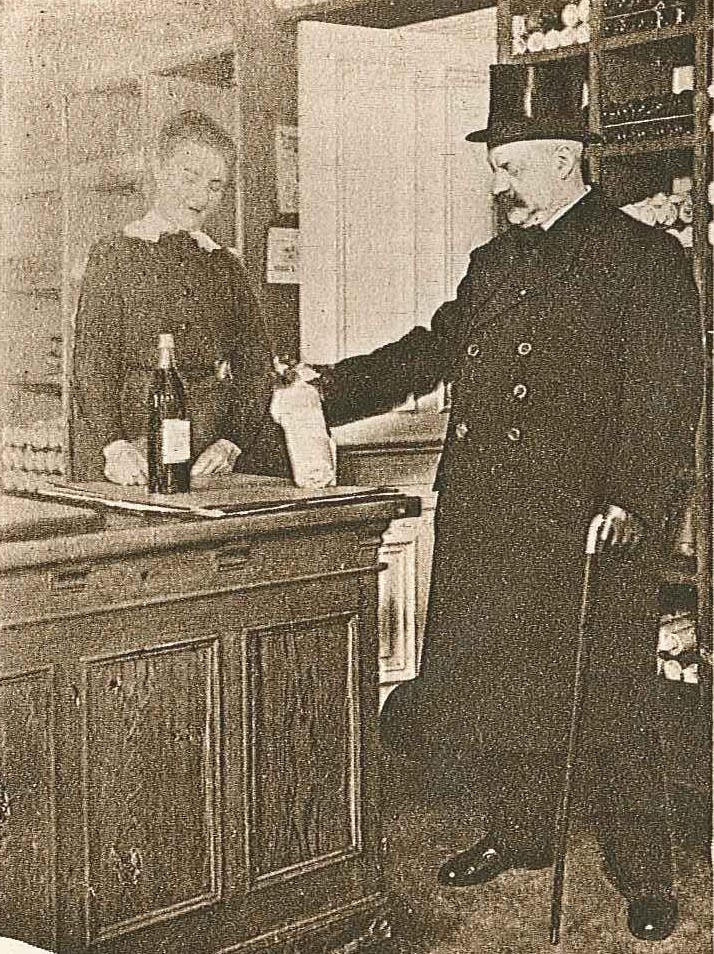
Emil Norlander 1916

The following shows were produced by Emil Norlander.

- 1899 - Den stora strejken
- 1900 - Den förgyllda lergöken
- 1901 - Prinsessan Habbahabba
- 1902 - I sjunde himlen
- 1903 - Damen med masken
- 1903 - Jönsson, Jonsson, Jansson
- 1903 - Gubben i Renberget
- 1904 - Kovander, Bovander & C:i
- 1905 - Stockholmsluft
- 1905 - Bluff
- 1906 - Kalle Munter
- 1907 - Stackars Olson
- 1907 - Mångubben
- 1908 - N:r 30 Gustafsson
- 1908 - Johnsons 7 fruar
- 1909 - Konstgjorda Svensson
- 1909 - Nick Carter
- 1910 - Tokiga Amelie
- 1910 - Tre jobbande pojkar
- 1911 - Spasmiga Wahlund
- 1912 - Stockholmsgask
- 1912 - Stockholmsgreker
- 1913 - Sankt Jönsson och Draken
- 1914 - Stockholmsflugor
- 1915 - Stockholm runt på 140 minuter
- 1915 - Restaurant Pumpen
- 1916 - Stockholmsjobb
- 1917 - Teaterflugan
- 1917 - Malla
- 1918 - Tokstollar
- 1918 - Filmkungen
- 1919 - Tutti-Frutti
- 1919 - Lev livet leende
- 1920 - Cirkus Jönsson
- 1922 - Venuspassagen
- 1922 - Med pukor och trumpeter
- 1923 - Kungarevyn
- 1924 - Festprissar
- 1925 - Genom kikaren
- 1926 - Slag i slag

== Gallery ==
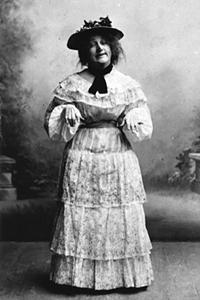
Den förgyllda lergöken 1900

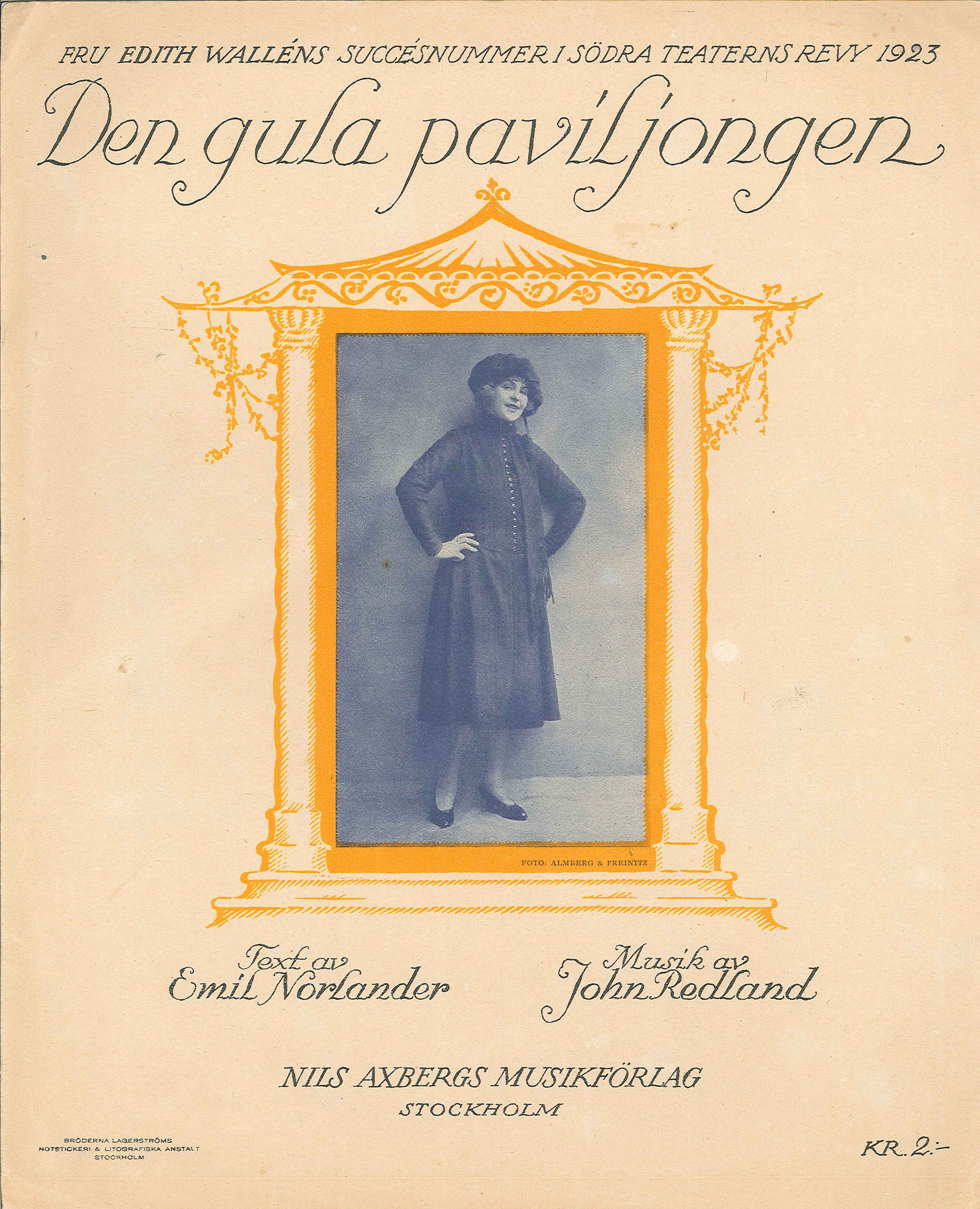
Den gula paviljongen 1923

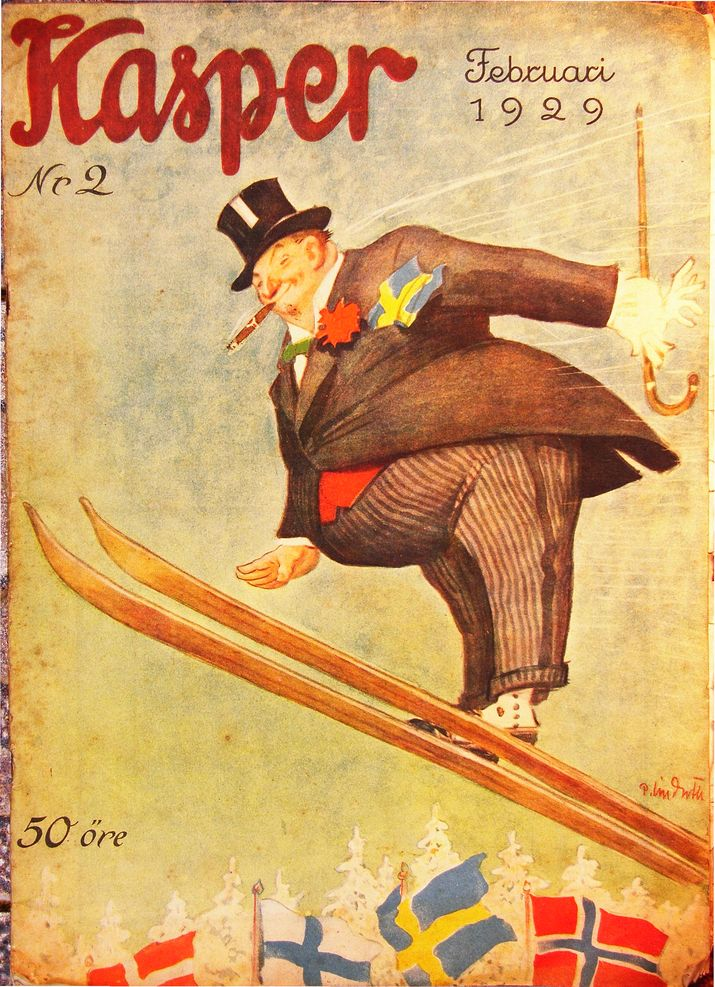
Kasper 1929
