= Jödde i Göljaryd =

Swedish storyteller (1855–1900)

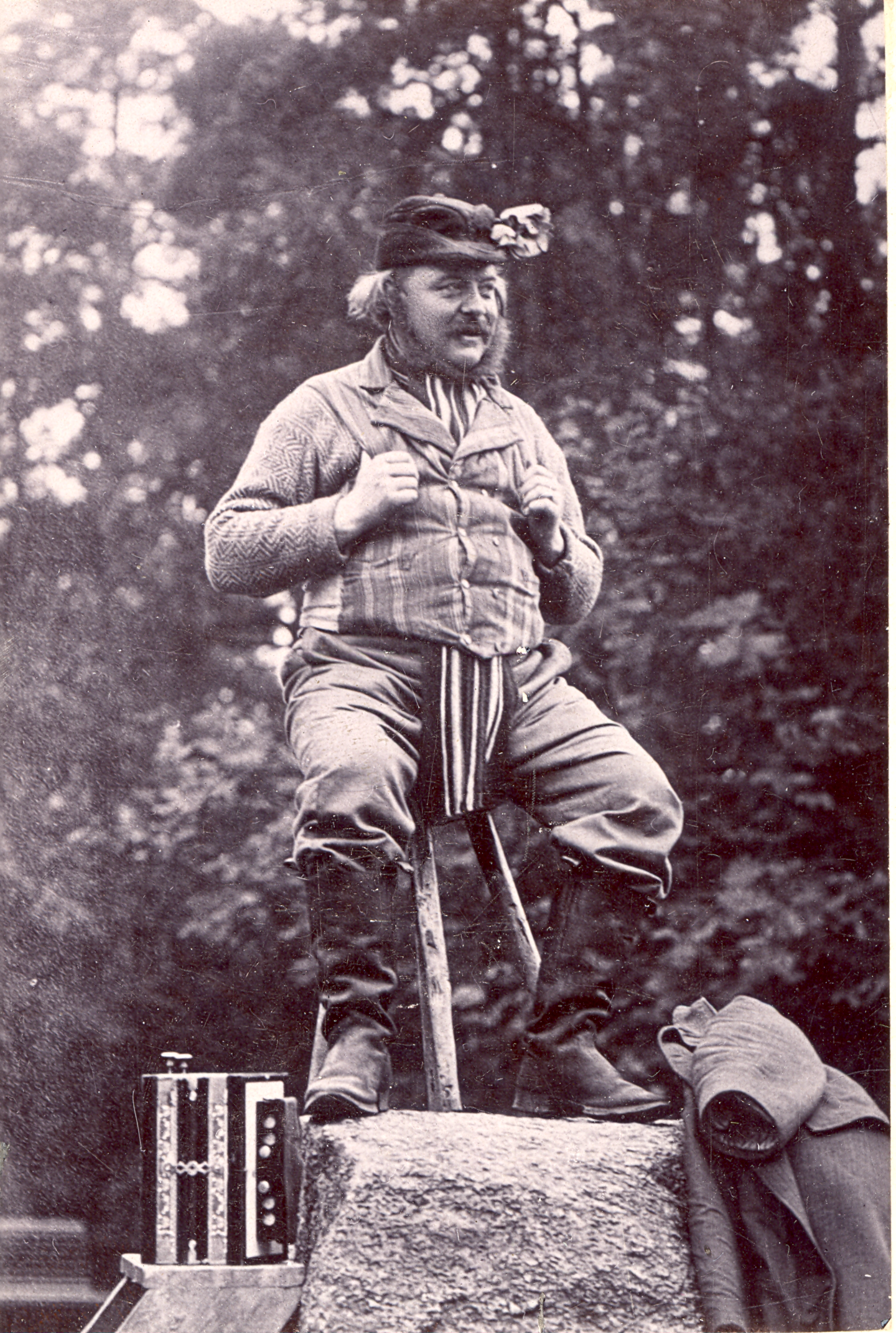
- Born: Karl Petter Rosén; 12 February 1855; Sävsjö, Sweden
- Died: 25 January 1900 (aged 44); Stockholm, Sweden
- Occupations: Storyteller; songwriter

Karl Petter Rosén, known by his stage name Jödde i Göljaryd (12 February 1855 – 25 January 1900) was a Swedish storyteller and songwriter. Known as the father of bondkomik (rustic humor), his beloved folk humor and songs dominated popular culture in Sweden during the 1890s.

== Biography ==
The entertainer was famous for his stone – Jödde’s Stone – which can still be seen at the open-air museum of Skansen in Stockholm's Djurgården park. 1893 was the year he began performing at Skansen with every manner of story and anecdote, often in the dialect of Småland, and with homey songs of a rural nature.

In 1899 and 1900 Rosén published two collections of songs and stories gathered during his travels through Sweden. His songbooks — like those of his contemporary Lars Bondeson — were highly influential and an important source of material for the next generation of bondkomiker (rustic comics). America's foremost Swedish comedian, Olle i Skratthult, had three songs and three stories by Jödde i Göljaryd in his first songbook and went on to record four of Jödde's songs in the 1920s: Alundavisan, Beväringsvisa, I Värmeland där ä dä så gutt, gutt, gutt and Ja' gick mig ut en sommardag.
