= Baltic Exhibition =

Exhibition

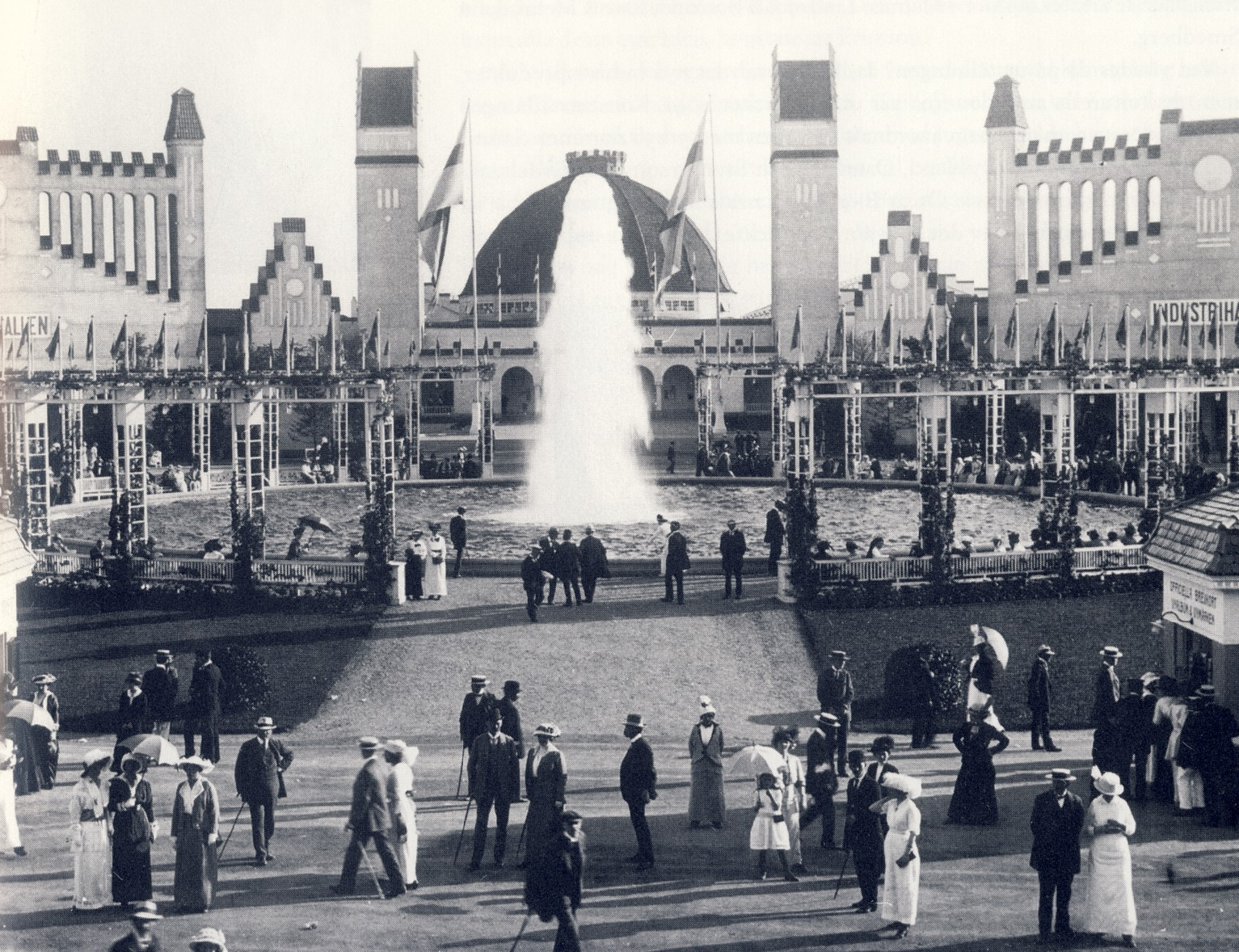
The Baltic Exhibition, 1914

The Baltic Exhibition (Swedish: Baltiska utställningen) was held in Malmö, Sweden from 15 May to 4 October 1914. (The official closing date, September 30, was later extended by four days, as permitted in the general rules.)

== A Swedish world's fair ==
The event showcased the industry, art and culture of Sweden, Denmark, Germany and Russia — the four countries then bordering the Baltic Sea. The city itself has no beaches on the Baltic, but there is one nearby at Øresund.

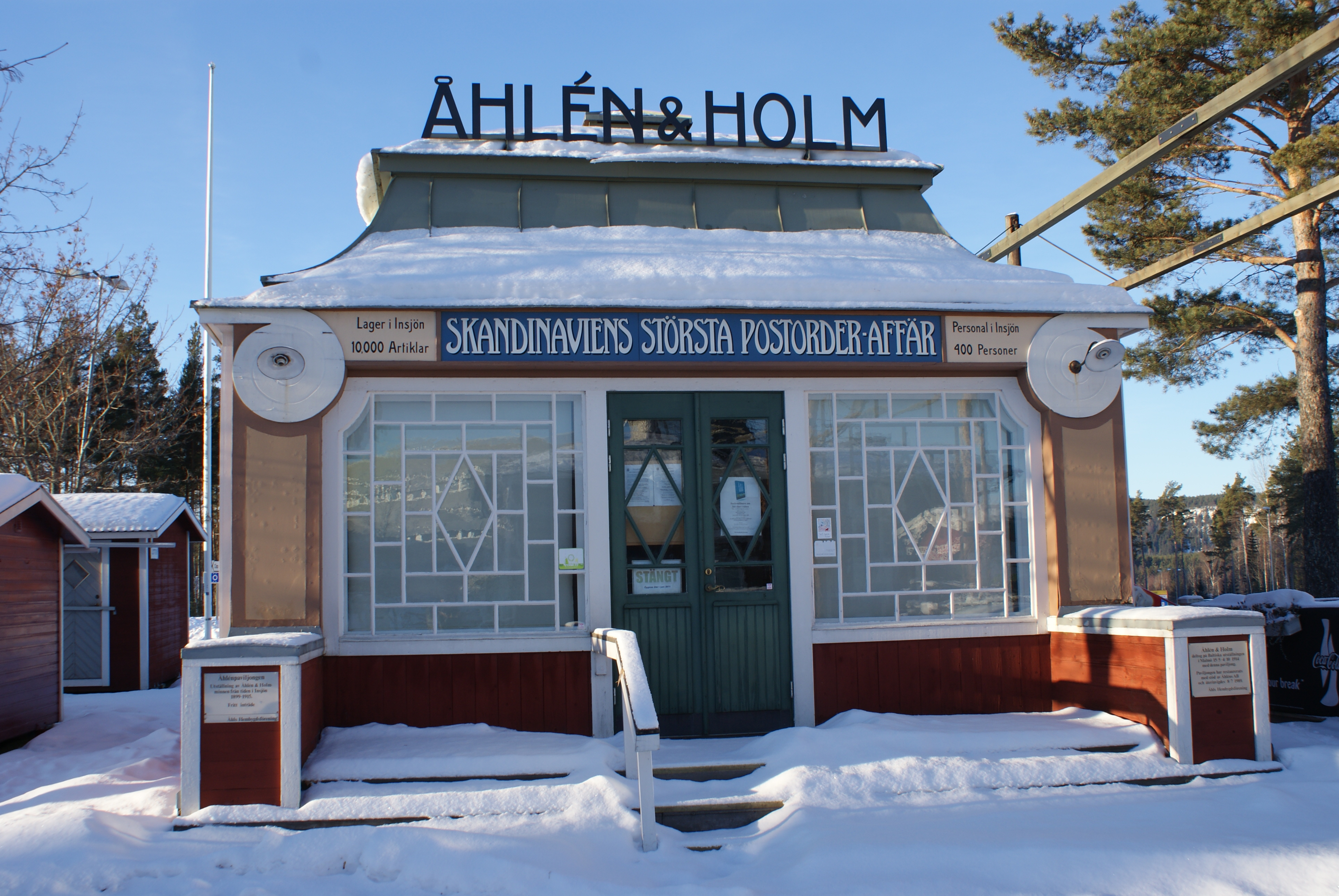
Åhléns Pavilion.

The Baltic Games were held at the same time, and to this day, they were one of the largest sporting events ever held in Malmö. After the Olympics in Stockholm in 1912, interest in sports had rapidly increased in Sweden, and this was one of the reasons why the Baltic Games became so large. The games were divided into three competition periods: gymnastics (June 7-10), "traditional" competitive sports (June 28-July 12), and sailing (August 6-9). The swimming competitions, lasting for twelve days, attracted many internationally known athletes.

For the occasion, many of Malmö's parks were renovated and a large new park, Pildammsparken, was created. The Swedish architect Ferdinand Boberg designed several of the exhibition buildings, most of which were removed soon after the event closed. Remaining in Pildammsparken today is the Royal Pavilion, now called the Margareta Pavilion. The Åhléns Pavilion, relocated to the town of Insjön in Dalarna, was one of the few structures to survive. The songs Malmövalsen and Baltirullan, written to celebrate the fair, have lived on through recordings in both Sweden and the United States. The latter song can be found at video-sharing websites and digital download services in a recording from 2008.

World War I interrupted the exhibition when Germany and Russia entered the conflict on opposing sides. After the war, Russia no longer existed, and some of the Russian art displayed in Malmö remained and eventually became part of the city's own collections, now on display at Malmö Art Museum in Malmö Castle.

== See also ==
- Baltic states
- Baltic region
