= John Sundquist =

American missionary (1936–2021)

Dr. John A. Sundquist (August 2, 1936 - February 21, 2021) was the executive director of the Board of International Ministries of American Baptist Churches USA during 1990-2003. He was one of the most prominent denominational and global Baptist leaders.

A native of Chicago, he began as a prison chaplain and held pastorates in Minnesota. He had a B.A. degree in psychology from Bethel College, M.Div. from Bethel Theological Seminary, D.Min. in Church Organizational Theory from McCormack Theological Seminary and an honorary D.D. degree from Alderson Broaddus College. He and his wife, Carol, are parents of two grown sons.

Before joining the International Ministries, he directed the Alive in Mission campaign (1985–88), the largest single effort to raise funds for American Baptist mission across the U.S. and around the world. Before that Sundquist served in Ohio as executive minister (1977-1985), in Michigan as associate executive minister and area minister for Metro Detroit (1972-1977) and in Minnesota as area minister for the Twin Cities and Northern Minnesota (1970–72).

== Nagaland ==
On Nov. 27-30, 1998, he addressed the quasquicentennial celebration of 125 years of Christianity in Nagaland State in northeast India attended by 120,000 Nagas and an estimated overflow crowd of 30,000. He called on the Nagas, who are divided into six underground factions, to stop the culture of retribution. About 1,000 underground members were present at the quasquicentennial celebration and when Sundquist asked for leaders who were "willing to forgive and forget in the name of Christ," nine leaders stood and were recognized.
