= Ragnar Sundquist =

Swedish accordionist and composer

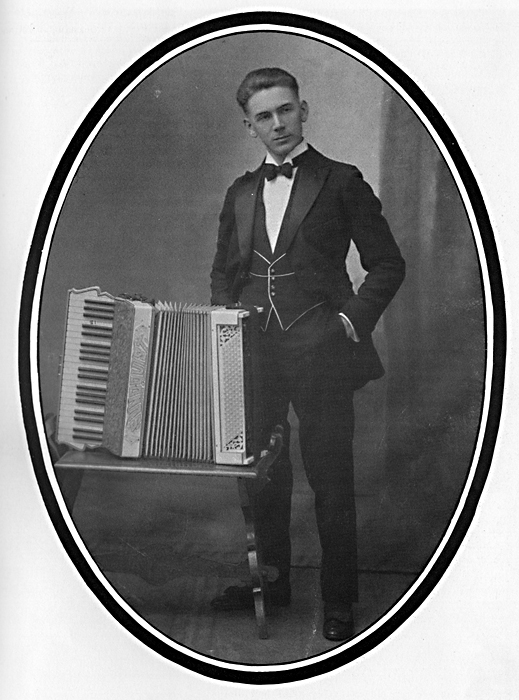
Ragnar Sundquist on tour in America during the 1920s.

Ragnar "Raggie" Sundquist (May 7, 1892 – November 10, 1951) was a popular Swedish accordionist and composer in the first half of the 1900s. He was born and died in Stockholm.

Sundquist not only performed for audiences in Sweden but toured the United States on three occasions: 1912–13, 1916–20 and 1923–26. He had booked passage on the Titanic's maiden voyage in 1912, but his mother persuaded him to take a later boat. Starting in the late 1920s, Sundquist appeared on a long-running Swedish radio program with accordionist Sven Hylén.

Ragnar Sundquist was a prolific recording artist with over 400 releases on Swedish and American labels. He made dozens of recordings for Columbia and Victor Records during his lengthy stays in the United States. His American records featured Sundquist in duets with the Swedish-born accordionists: Eric Berg, Arvid Franzen and Eric Olson. He also went on American tours with Berg and Franzen. Two of his best-known songs were Bågskytten (The archer) and Lekande steg (Playful steps).

Sundquist launched a number of business ventures. They included a music store, publishing house and record label. He even owned an accordion factory, where he produced his own model: the "Raggie Special". He was an innovator in Swedish accordion music, who introduced the "bellows shake" technique to Sweden. He also popularized the Italian-American style of playing that he had personally learned from Pietro Frosini while in America.

Ragnar Sundquist is buried in Stockholm's Skogskyrkogården. In the early 1970s Sveriges Dragspelares Riksförbund (The Swedish Accordionists Association) raised money for a tomb that was erected at his grave site.

In 2011 the Library of Congress opened its National Jukebox website with streaming audio for eighteen recordings by Ragnar Sundquist.
