= Lydia Hedberg =

Swedish singer

Bergslagsmor
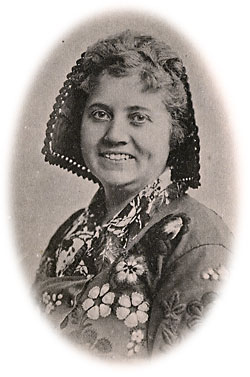
- Born: Anna Lydia Pettersson; 5 January 1878; Falun, Dalarna
- Died: 10 June 1964 (aged 86); Sundsvall, Medelpad
- Occupations: singer, storyteller
- Spouse(s): Torbjörn Hedberg (1904–1918)

Lydia Hedberg (1878–1964) was a Swedish singer, who performed in folk costume and was known as Bergslagsmor (Mother of the Mining District).

== Biography ==
According to a critic at Vecko-journalen (The Weekly Journal), Hedberg was "a sweet-sounding soprano with an echo of the rural forests, mountains, waterfalls and cow bells in her voice." She was one of the few women to be a bondkomiker (rustic comic) although she preferred to call herself a ballad singer.

Born in Falun in 1878, Hedberg was a trained physical therapist. From 1908 onwards she worked as a singer and storyteller, appearing frequently in Sweden’s folk parks during the 1910s and 1920s. She lived for a long time in Sundsvall and was also a host at Furuvik, an amusement park outside of Gävle.

== American tours ==
Hedberg contributed to the Swedish-American song repertoire during three extended tours of the United States made between 1921 and 1925. While on her longest tour she gave 50 concert performances in 81 days, acquainting audiences with the latest songs and stories from Sweden. She made a number of recordings for Columbia and Victor and sold songbooks at her concerts. Her 1925 recording of Johan på snippen was the first American version of the song.

In 1925 Hedberg published a book about her travels in the United States and wrote of her concern with audience reaction. She found "repeated proof that my singing softened their American hearts, whose very fibers must be moved by verses about the poor countryside at home in order that their true Swedish feelings might emerge."

== Legacy ==
The Centre for Swedish Folk Music and Jazz Research had two Hedberg recordings on its album “From Sweden To America”, which was released as an LP in 1981 and as a CD in 1996. It also had one track by Gustav Fonandern, another Swedish singer who toured America during the 1920s. In 2011 the 23 tracks on the CD were released on iTunes and Amazon mp3. The Swedish-American singer Olga Lindgren-Nilsen, who was married to Olle i Skratthult in the 1920s, gave credit to Hedberg, Fonandern and other performers from Sweden for providing much of her new material.
