= Gustav Fonandern =

Swedish architect, singer and recording artist (1880-1960)

- The Harry Lauder of Sweden
- Born: July 14, 1880; Gävle, Sweden
- Died: November 22, 1960 (aged 80)
- Occupations: architect, singer
- Spouse: Maria Lovisa Fonandern

Gustav Fonandern (1880-1960) was a Swedish architect, singer and recording artist, who spent considerable time in the United States during the 1920s.

== Architect and entertainer ==
As a young man Fonandern studied to be an architect. Upon graduation he opened his own firm in Gävle. It wasn’t long, however, before he began performing in cabarets in addition to his work as a draftsman. Eventually the singing took over, but he continued with his architectural activities when time allowed.

During the 1910s and 1920s Fonandern toured frequently and performed in Sweden's folk parks. In 1921 he embarked on an American tour, which took him from coast to coast by automobile, something never done by a Swedish artist before. In Duluth, Minnesota Fonandern gave his first ever radio performance.

Gustav Fonandern stayed in the United States off and on from 1921 through 1926. When he was not on tour or in the recording studio, he worked as an architect in Chicago and other cities. In addition to buildings in California and Florida, he designed 150 houses and a large hotel on Long Island, outside of New York.

After returning to Sweden Fonandern continued to tour, this time by car, which was so unusual at the time that advertising posters read: "Performance by GUSTAV FONANDERN, architect and ballad singer with his own car!".

Despite his great success as an entertainer, Fonandern never put away the drafting pen for good. In the early 1930s he founded yet another architectural firm, this time on Drottninggatan in Stockholm.

== Legacy ==
Gustav Fonandern recorded more than two hundred fifty songs in Sweden and over forty in the United States. His releases on the Columbia and Victor labels introduced current Swedish hits to his countrymen abroad. The Swedish-American singer Olga Lindgren-Nilsen, who was married to Olle i Skratthult in the 1920s, gave credit to Fonandern, Lydia Hedberg (Bergslagsmor) and other performers from Sweden for providing much of her new material.

The Centre for Swedish Folk Music and Jazz Research had one recording by Fonandern and two by Hedberg on its album "From Sweden To America", which was released as an LP in 1981 and as a CD in 1996. In 2011 the twenty-three tracks on the CD were released on iTunes and Amazon mp3.

In 2016 the Minnesota Historical Society opened an online archive of Swedish American newspapers. These historic publications give many accounts of Gustav Fonandern's American performances and recordings in the years 1921 – 1926. Search term is "Gustav Fonandern".

== Gallery ==
Gustav Fonandern 1910s

Gustav Fonandern 1910s

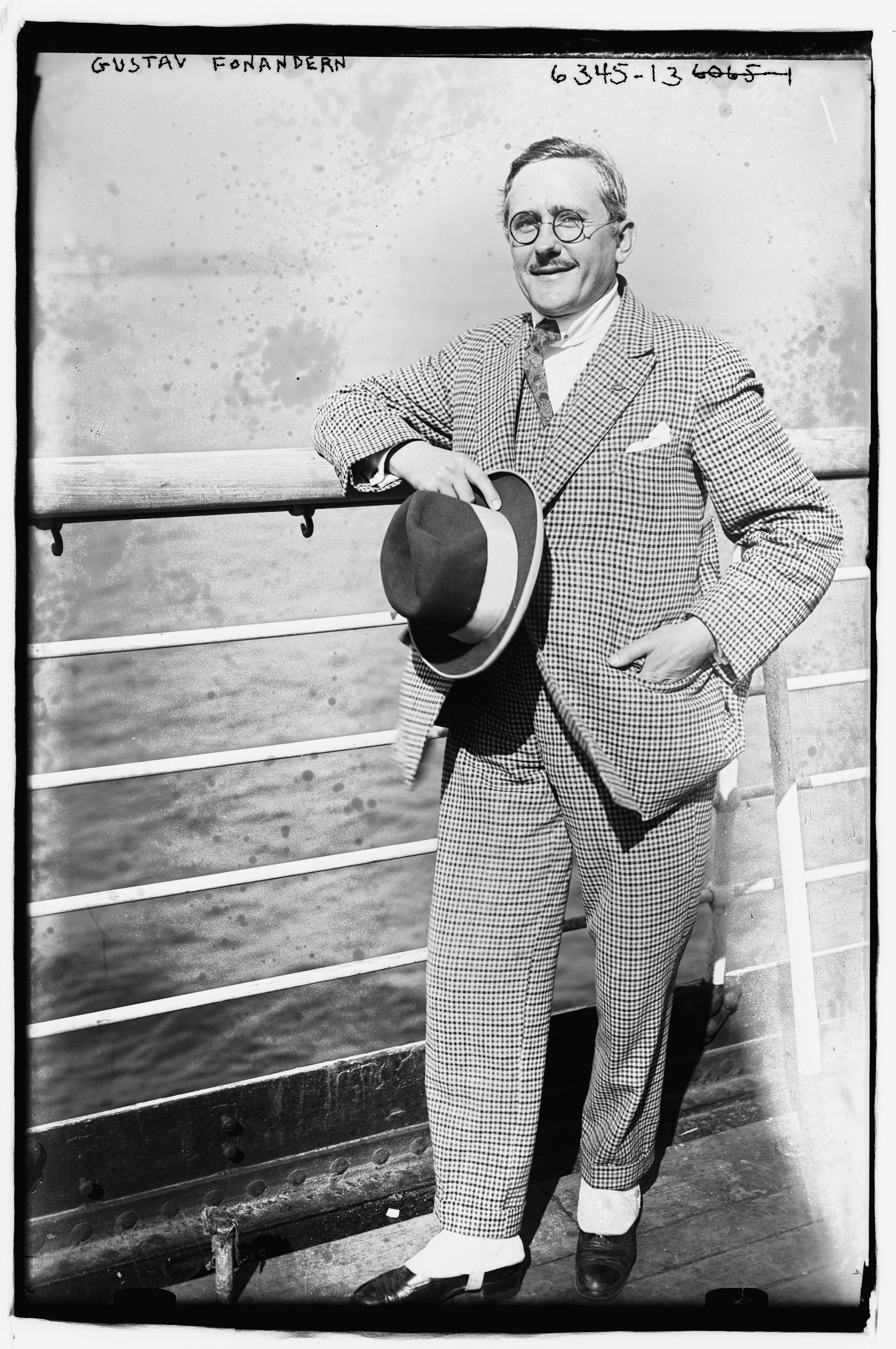
Gustav Fonandern 1920s
