= Bellmansro =

Restaurant in Stockholm, Sweden

Coordinates: 59°19′26.90″N 18°6′43.88″E

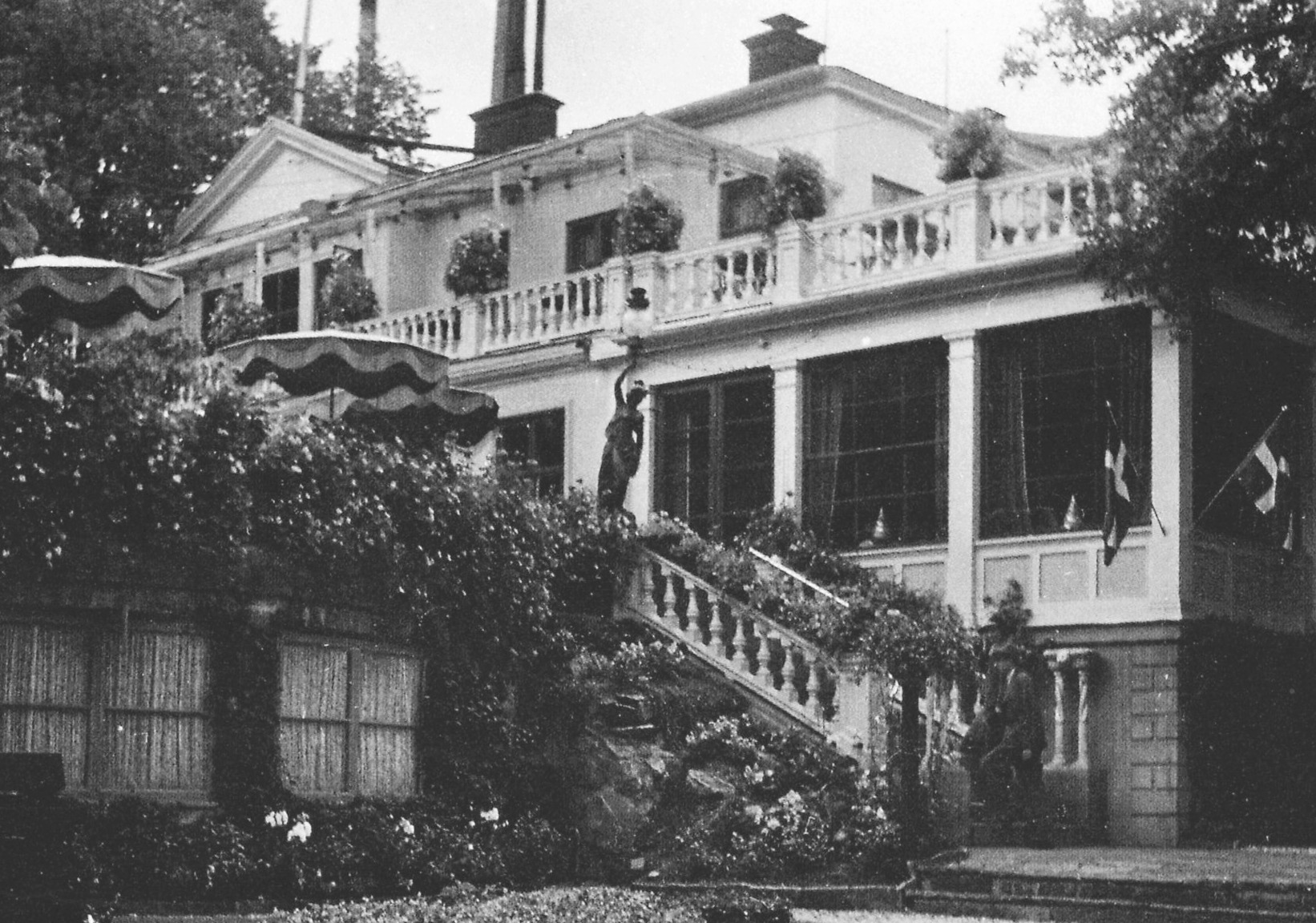
Bellmansro in 1940

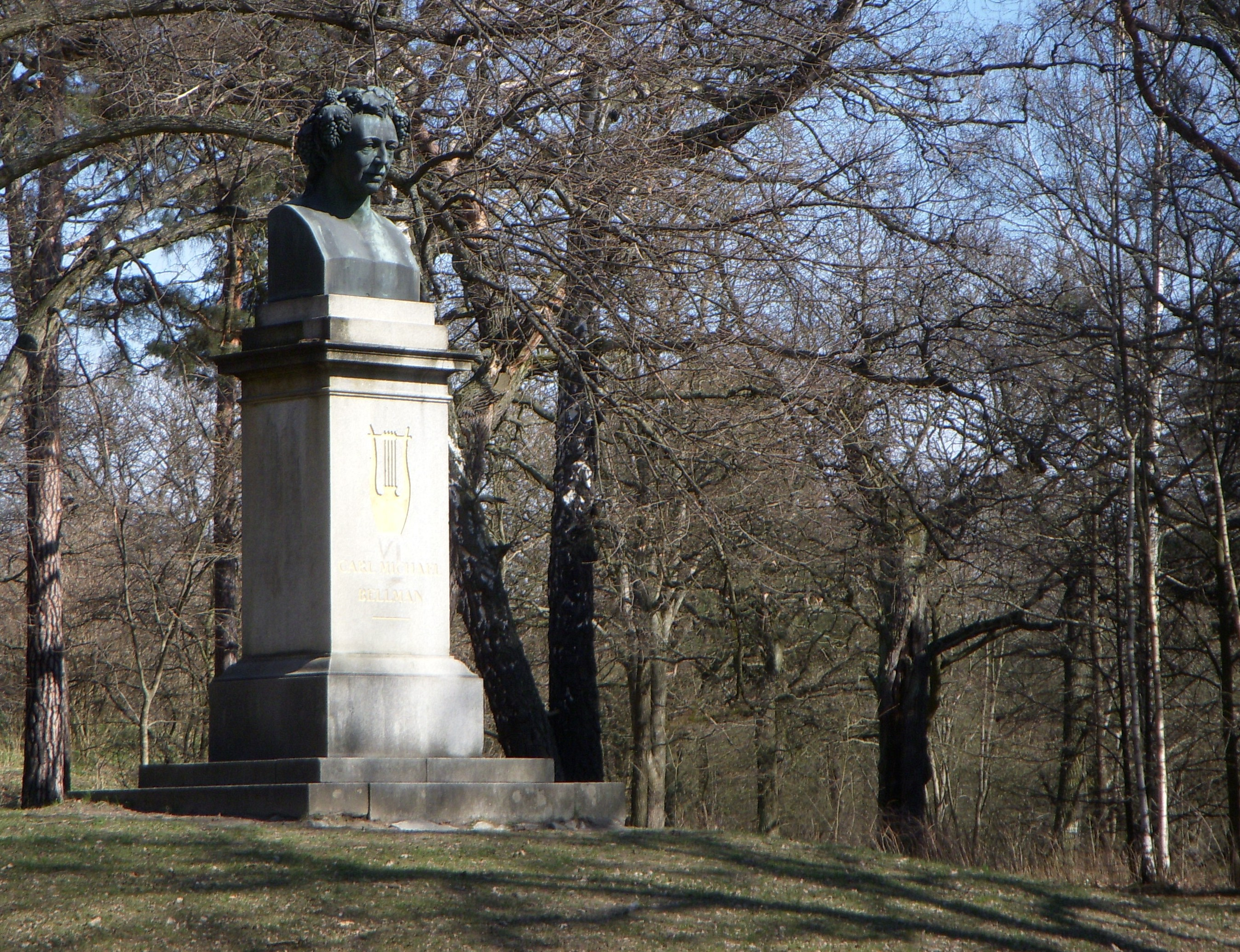
The bust of Bellman

Bellmansro was a restaurant north of Oakhill Palace on Djurgården island in Stockholm, which opened as a catering hall in 1828. The restaurant's eventual name reflected its proximity to Johan Niclas Byström's bust of Carl Michael Bellman that was dedicated on July 26, 1829. For much of its history Bellmansro was a tavern, but in the late 19th century it became a restaurant with food service.

By the early 1900s the establishment had fallen into disrepute. The building burned to the ground May 13, 1952. An annual festival, held on Bellman Day (July 26), commemorates the inauguration of the Bellman bust.
