= Arvid Franzen =

Swedish-American accordionist (1899–1961)

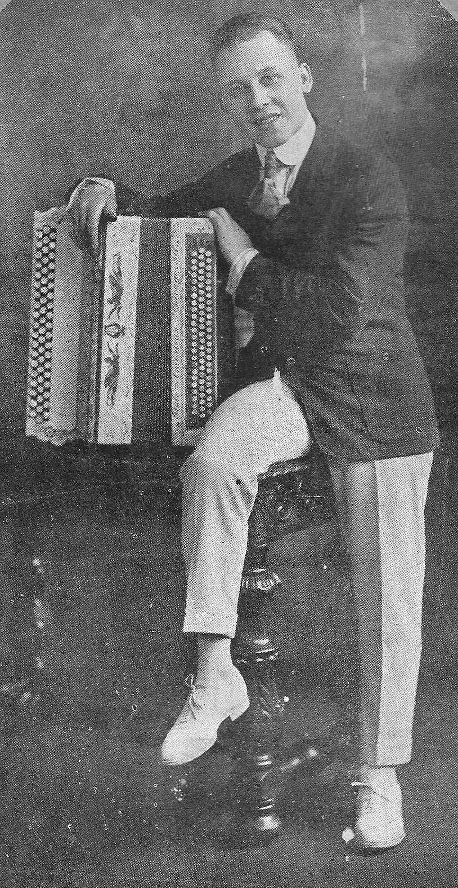

Background information
- Born: 1899; Gothenburg, Sweden
- Died: 1961 (aged 61–62) New York City, New York, U.S.
- Occupations: musician, bandleader
- Instrument: Accordion
- Years active: 1919–61

Arvid Franzen (1899–1961) was a Swedish-born accordionist and bandleader, whose live performances and numerous recordings made him a household name in Scandinavian communities throughout the United States.

== Career ==
A native of Gothenburg, Sweden, Franzen settled in the New York City area and fronted a large ensemble that performed on stage and at dances and social events for over four decades until his death in 1961.

Accordion pioneer Pietro Frosini played many concerts with Franzen and as a token of his esteem gave him an autographed photo with the following inscription: "To my 'old pal' Franzen with my greatest admiration for his efforts to place the accordion before the public in an artistic manner."

== Recordings ==
Franzen's first recordings were made in 1919, and over the years his music was released on the Colonial, Columbia, Scandinavian, Standard and Victor labels. Many of the records featured two accordions, and his long list of duet partners included Eric Berg, Walter Eriksson, Harold Freeman, Ture Gadde, Einar Holt, Eddie Jahrl, John Lager and Ragnar Sundquist. Franzen also toured with accordionists Eric Olson and Ragnar Sundquist and with the comedian Hjalmar Peterson.

Between 1927 and 1929 the Hjalmar Peterson Orchestra released eighteen instrumental tracks on Victor Records. Peterson's own band did not appear on the records, which were made by studio musicians in New York and Chicago. Among the session players were country music singer Carson Robison on guitar and Arvid Franzen on accordion.

In 1929 Franzen played on six Hjalmar Peterson recordings and on six Hjalmar Peterson Orchestra recordings. The same year he was a guest artist with Peterson's traveling company of singers, dancers and musicians on a tour of the Upper Midwest. The newspaper in Bagley, Minnesota wrote of an upcoming visit by "Arvid Franzen, the celebrated accordion artist, whose Victor and Columbia records are found in tens of thousands of Scandinavian homes."

Fifty years after his death Franzen's recordings are still sold by vintage music stores and online retailers. They can also be found at video-sharing websites and other digital archives. In 2011 the Library of Congress opened its National Jukebox website with streaming audio for fourteen songs by Arvid Franzen.

== Gallery ==
Arvid Franzen in Victor catalog

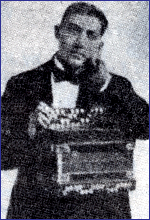
Pietro Frosini 1906

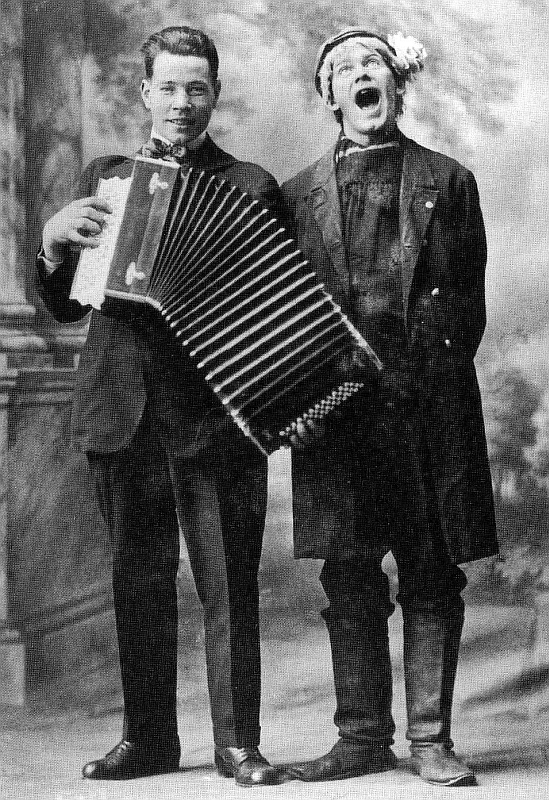
L to R: Gustav Nyberg and Olle i Skratthult 1916

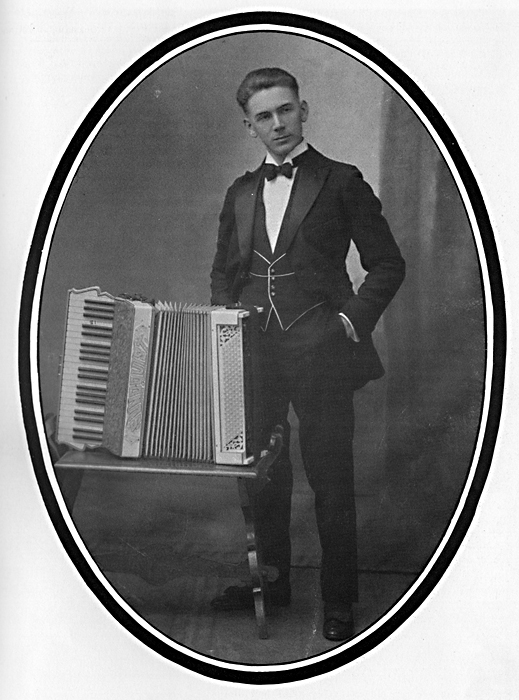
Ragnar Sundquist 1920
