= Ragnar Hasselgren =

American singer

- Born: June 3, 1904; Dalarna, Sweden
- Died: September 28, 1982 (aged 78); Pacifica, California
- Occupations: singer, recording artist
- Spouse: Walberg M. Hasselgren

Ragnar Hasselgren (June 3, 1904 – September 28, 1982) was a Swedish-born singer and recording artist, who was active on the American West Coast from the 1920s through the 1970s.

== Life and legacy ==
Hasselgren was born in 1904 in the Swedish province of Dalarna. His birthplace was the town of Strömshyttan, which is located between Hedemora and Vikmanshyttan. He emigrated with his parents when not quite two years old and as a child spoke only English. When he was eighteen, he was hired by a Swedish building contractor in California, who gave preference to Swedes and people of Swedish descent. A company benefit enabled workers to learn English. Since Hasselgren already knew that language he learned Swedish instead.

Ragnar Hasselgren played guitar and sang at Swedish-American clubs in the Bay Area for much of his adult life and recorded nearly two dozen songs in the 1940s and 1950s. His recordings were distributed by Harmony Music of Berkeley and Gaare Records of Oakland. Performing in Swedish and English, he had a repertoire that encompassed Swedish folk songs, American popular music and novelty numbers in Scandinavian dialect.

In the early 1960s Harmony Music released two albums featuring Ragnar Hasselgren. The Centre for Swedish Folk Music and Jazz Research also had one of Hasselgren's recordings on its album "From Sweden To America", which was released as an LP in 1981 and as a CD in 1996. In 2011 the twenty-three tracks on the CD were released on iTunes and Amazon mp3.

In 2016 the Minnesota Historical Society opened an online archive of Swedish American newspapers. These historic publications give many accounts of Hasselgren's performances and recordings from the 1920s through the 1970s. Search term is "Ragnar Hasselgren".
