= Folkpark =

Public recreation space in Sweden

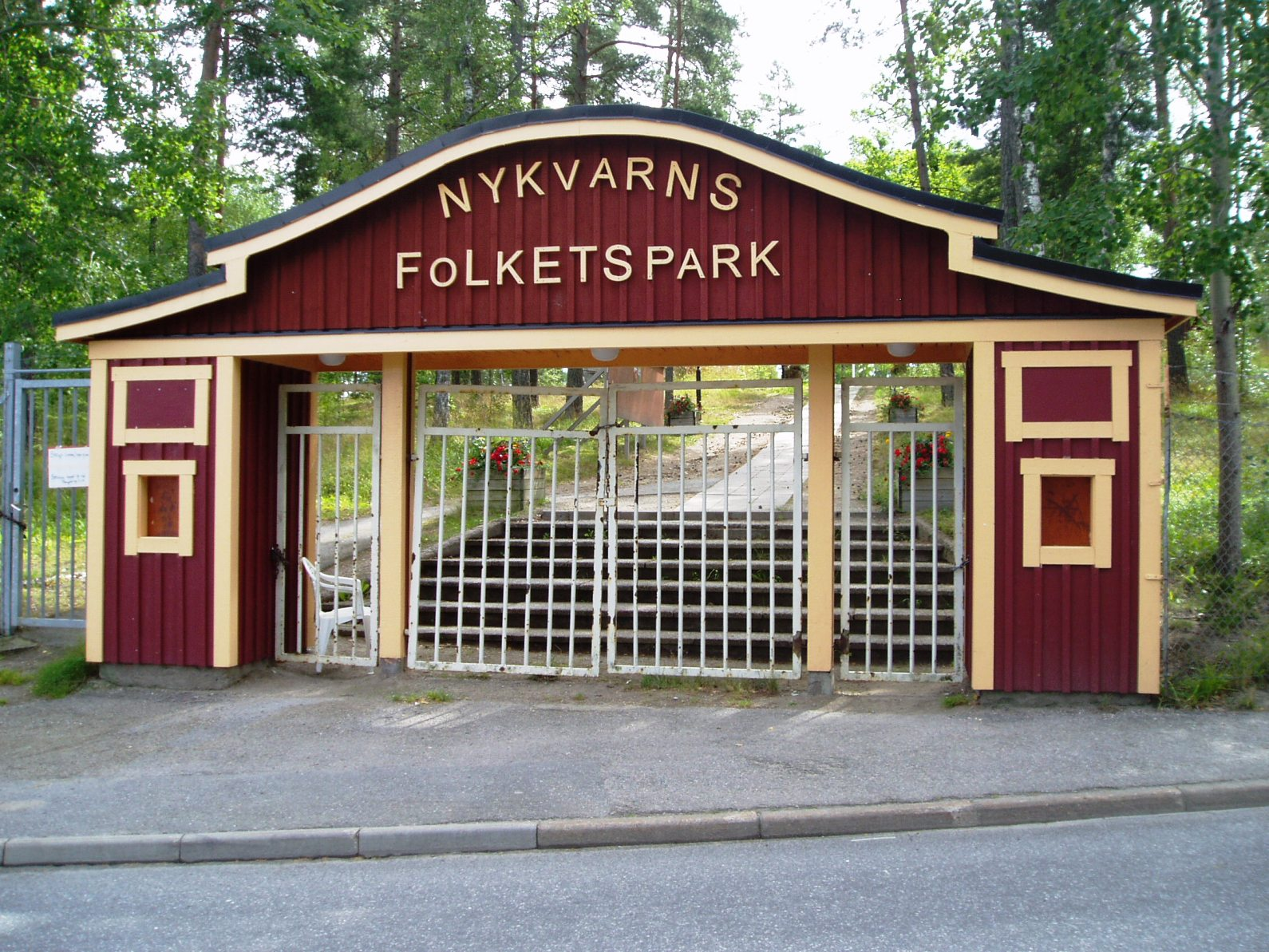
Entrance to Nykvarn folkpark in Stockholm County

In Sweden, a folkpark (also called Folkets park; approximately "people's park" in English) is a public recreation space, usually featuring large grassed areas, trees, children's play facilities, etc. Most towns and cities have a folkpark. These parks were originally created by the labour movement as places where political rallies could be held and where workers and their families could unwind. In larger folkparks, there is sometimes a bandstand or stage, and they are used for concerts and other entertainment. Summer folkpark tours are a traditional part of the touring circuit for bands, etc.

== See also ==
- Folkets hus
- Folkhemmet
