= 1873 in music =

This article is about music-related events in 1873.

== Events ==
- April – The Fisk Jubilee Singers, an African American a cappella ensemble, perform before Queen Victoria during their first European tour.
- August 27 – Sir Arthur Sullivan's oratorio The Light of the World (inspired by William Holman Hunt's painting of the same name) is premièred at the Birmingham Festival.
- December 7 – Première of Camille Saint-Saëns's symphonic poem Phaéton at the Théâtre du Châtelet in Paris, performed by the Concert National conducted by Édouard Colonne.
- Joseph Parry becomes Professor of Music at the University of Wales, Aberystwyth.
- Therese Malten makes her solo debut as Pamina in The Magic Flute at Dresden.

== Published popular music ==
- "The German Polka" by Gus Williams (vaudeville)
- "Good Sweet Ham" by Henry Hart
- "Home on the Range" w. Brewster M. Higley m. Daniel E. Kelley
- "I'se Gwine Back to Dixie" by Charles A. White (musician)
- "Little sweetheart, come listen to me". Words and music by Arthur W. French
- "Silver Threads Among the Gold" w. Eben Eugene Rexford m. Hart Pease Danks

== Classical music ==
- Johannes Brahms
  - Two String Quartets, Op. 51
  - Variations on a Theme by Haydn
- Anton Bruckner – Symphony No. 3
- Antonín Dvořák – String Quartet No. 5; String Quartet no. 6 in A
- Hermann Goetz – Symphony in F, Op. 9 (premiered 1874; some sources give 1866 for composition however)
- Pyotr Ilyich Tchaikovsky – The Tempest
- Giuseppe Verdi – String Quartet in E minor
- Camille Saint-Saëns's – Phaéton

== Opera ==
- Léo Delibes — Le roi l'a dit
- Karel Miry — Muziek in t'huisgezin (opera in 1 act, libretto by N. Destanberg)

== Musical theater ==
- 1492 Up to Date, Libretto by R. A. Barnet, music by Carl Pflueger

== Births ==
- January 8 — Grace Van Studdiford, American stage actress and opera singer (d. 1927)
- February 1 — Joseph Allard, fiddler and composer (d. 1947)
- February 13 — Feodor Chaliapin, operatic bass (d. 1938)
- February 27 — Enrico Caruso, operatic tenor (d. 1921)
- March 19 — Max Reger, German composer (d. 1916)
- April 1 — Sergei Rachmaninoff, Russian composer (d. 1943)
- April 18 — Jean Roger-Ducasse, French composer (d. 1954)
- May 1 — Harry Evans, composer (d. 1914)
- June 1 — Ada Jones, singer (d. 1922)
- June 16 — Antonina Nezhdanova, operatic soprano (d. 1950)
- July 11 — Nat M. Wills, singer, comedian, and actor (d. 1917)
- August 11 — J. Rosamond Johnson, US composer and singer
- August 18 — Otto Harbach, lyricist (d. 1963)
- September 21 — Papa Jack Laine, bandleader (d. 1966)
- October 14 — José Serrano, composer (d. 1941)
- October 23 — Ricardo Villa, composer (d. 1935)
- November 1 — Charles Quef, French organist and composer (d. 1931)
- November 16 — W. C. Handy, songwriter (d. 1958)
- December 9 — Carlo Zangarini, opera librettist and poet (d. 1943)
- December 14 — Joseph Jongen, Belgian organist and composer (d. 1953)
- Unknown day

- Virginia Galván de Nava, Mexican soprano and voice teacher (d. 1950s)

== Deaths ==
- January 3 — John Lodge Ellerton, composer (b. 1801)
- January 28 — Henry Hugo Pierson, composer (b. 1815)
- February 14 — Charles Samuel Bovy-Lysberg, composer and pianist (b. 1821)
- March 31 — Domenico Donzelli, operatic tenor (b. 1790)
- April 13 — Carlo Coccia, opera composer (b. 1782)
- April 19 — Pierre-Chéri Lafont, actor and singer (b. 1797)
- May 13 — Kašpar Mašek, composer (b. 1794)
- June 2 — François George-Hainl, cellist, conductor and composer (b. 1807)
- July 4 — Prince Józef Michal Poniatowski, operatic tenor and composer (b. 1816)
- July 19 — Ferdinand David, violinist and composer (b. 1810)
- August 26 — Karl Wilhelm, choral director (b. 1815)
- September 26 — Roderich Benedix, librettist and singer (b. 1811)
- October 6 — Friedrich Wieck, music teacher and father of Clara Schumann (b. 1785)
- October 8 — Albrecht Agthe, music teacher (b. 1790)
