= List of Songwriters Hall of Fame inductees =

The Songwriters Hall of Fame is an American institution founded in 1969 by songwriter Johnny Mercer and music publishers Abe Olman and Howie Richmond to honor those whose work represents a spectrum of the most beloved songs from the world's popular music songbook. The Hall of Fame only existed as an online virtual collection until 2010, when it was first put on display as a physical gallery inside The Grammy Museum in Los Angeles.

Through 2019, 461 individuals have been inducted.

== 1970s ==
Return to top of page

=== 1970 ===
- Fred E. Ahlert
- Ernest Ball
- Katharine Lee Bates
- Irving Berlin
- William Billings
- James A. Bland
- James Brockman
- Lew Brown
- Nacio Herb Brown
- Alfred Bryan
- Joe Burke
- Johnny Burke
- Anne Caldwell
- Harry Carroll
- Sidney Clare
- George M. Cohan
- Con Conrad
- Sam Coslow
- Hart Pease Danks
- Reginald De Koven
- Peter De Rose
- Buddy De Sylva
- Mort Dixon
- Walter Donaldson
- Paul Dresser
- Dave Dreyer
- Al Dubin
- Vernon Duke
- Gus Edwards (The Star Maker)
- Raymond B. Egan
- Daniel Decatur Emmett
- Ted Fiorito
- Fred Fisher
- Stephen Foster
- George Gershwin
- L. Wolfe Gilbert
- Patrick Gilmore
- Mack Gordon
- Ferde Grofe
- Woody Guthrie
- Oscar Hammerstein II
- W. C. Handy
- James F. Hanley
- Otto Harbach
- Charles K. Harris
- Lorenz Hart
- Ray Henderson
- Victor Herbert
- Billy Hill
- Joseph E. Howard
- Julia Ward Howe
- Carrie Jacobs-Bond
- Howard Johnson
- James P. Johnson
- James Weldon Johnson
- Arthur Johnston
- Isham Jones
- Scott Joplin
- Irving Kahal
- Gus Kahn
- Bert Kalmar
- Jerome Kern
- Francis Scott Key
- Lead Belly
- Sam M. Lewis
- Frank Loesser
- Ballard MacDonald
- Edward Madden
- Joseph McCarthy
- Jimmy McHugh
- George W. Meyer
- James V. Monaco
- Neil Moret
- Theodore Morse
- Lewis F. Muir
- Ethelbert Nevin
- Jack Norworth
- Chauncey Olcott
- John Howard Payne
- James Pierpont
- Lew Pollack
- Cole Porter
- Ralph Rainger
- Harry Revel
- Eben E. Rexford
- Jimmie Rodgers
- Richard Rodgers
- Sigmund Romberg
- George F. Root
- Billy Rose
- Vincent Rose
- Harry Ruby
- Bob Russell
- Jean Schwartz
- Harry B. Smith
- Samuel Francis Smith
- Ted Snyder
- John Philip Sousa
- Andrew B. Sterling
- Harry Tierney
- Charles Tobias
- Roy Turk
- Egbert Van Alstyne
- Albert Von Tilzer
- Harry Von Tilzer
- Fats Waller
- Samuel A. Ward
- Kurt Weill
- Percy Wenrich
- Richard A. Whiting
- Clarence Williams
- Hank Williams
- Spencer Williams
- Septimus Winner (Sep)
- Harry M. Woods
- Henry Clay Work
- Allie Wrubel
- Vincent Youmans

=== 1971 ===
- Harold Arlen
- Hoagy Carmichael
- Duke Ellington
- Dorothy Fields
- Rudolf Friml
- Ira Gershwin
- Alan Jay Lerner
- Johnny Mercer
- Jimmy Van Heusen
- Harry Warren

=== 1972 ===
- Harold Adamson
- Milton Ager
- Burt Bacharach
- Leonard Bernstein
- Jerry Bock
- Irving Caesar
- Sammy Cahn
- J. Fred Coots
- Hal David
- Howard Dietz
- Sammy Fain
- Arthur Freed
- Haven Gillespie
- John Green
- Yip Harburg
- Sheldon Harnick
- Ted Koehler
- Burton Lane
- Edgar Leslie
- Frederick Loewe
- Joseph Meyer
- Mitchell Parish
- Andy Razaf
- Leo Robin
- Arthur Schwartz
- Pete Seeger
- Carl Sigman
- Jule Styne
- Ned Washington
- Mabel Wayne
- Paul Francis Webster
- Jack Yellen

=== 1975 ===
- Louis Alter
- Mack David
- Benny Davis
- Edward Eliscu
- Bud Green
- Lou Handman
- Edward Heyman
- Jack Lawrence
- Stephen Sondheim

=== 1977 ===
- Ray Evans
- Jay Livingston

== 1980s ==
Return to top of page

=== 1980 ===
- Alan Bergman
- Marilyn Bergman
- Betty Comden
- Adolph Green
- Herb Magidson

=== 1981 ===
- Cy Coleman
- Jerry Livingston
- Johnny Marks

=== 1982 ===
- Rube Bloom
- Bob Dylan
- Jerry Herman
- Gordon Jenkins
- Harold Rome
- Jerry Ross
- Paul Simon
- Al Stillman
- Meredith Willson

=== 1983 ===
- Harry Akst
- Ralph Blane
- Ervin Drake
- Fred Ebb
- Bob Hilliard
- John Kander
- Hugh Martin
- Neil Sedaka
- Harry Tobias
- Alec Wilder
- Stevie Wonder

=== 1984 ===
- Richard Adler
- Bennie Benjamin
- Neil Diamond
- Norman Gimbel
- Al Hoffman
- Henry Mancini
- Maceo Pinkard
- Billy Strayhorn
- George David Weiss

=== 1985 ===
- Saul Chaplin
- Gene De Paul
- Kris Kristofferson
- Jerry Leiber
- Carolyn Leigh
- Don Raye
- Fred Rose
- Mike Stoller
- Charles Strouse

=== 1986 ===
- Chuck Berry
- Boudleaux Bryant
- Felice Bryant
- Marvin Hamlisch
- Buddy Holly
- Jimmy Webb

=== 1987 ===
- Sam Cooke
- Gerry Goffin
- Carole King
- John Lennon
- Barry Mann
- Paul McCartney
- Bob Merrill
- Carole Bayer Sager
- Cynthia Weil

=== 1988 ===
- Leroy Anderson
- Noël Coward
- Lamont Dozier
- Brian Holland
- Eddie Holland

=== 1989 ===
- Lee Adams
- Leslie Bricusse
- Eddie DeLange
- Anthony Newley
- Roy Orbison

== 1990s ==
Return to top of page

=== 1990 ===
- Jim Croce
- Michel Legrand
- Smokey Robinson

=== 1991 ===
- Jeff Barry
- Otis Blackwell
- Howard Greenfield
- Ellie Greenwich
- Antônio Carlos Jobim

=== 1992 ===
- Linda Creed
- Billy Joel
- Elton John
- Mort "Doc" Pomus
- Mort Shuman
- Bernie Taupin

=== 1993 ===
- Paul Anka
- Mick Jagger (The Rolling Stones)
- Bert Kaempfert
- Herb Rehbein
- Keith Richards (The Rolling Stones)

=== 1994 ===
- Barry Gibb (Bee Gees)
- Maurice Gibb (Bee Gees)
- Robin Gibb (Bee Gees)
- Otis Redding
- Lionel Richie
- Carly Simon

=== 1995 ===
- Bob Crewe
- Kenneth Gamble
- Bob Gaudio
- Leon Huff
- Andrew Lloyd Webber
- Max Steiner

=== 1996 ===
- Charles Aznavour
- John Denver
- Ray Noble

=== 1997 ===
- Harlan Howard
- Jimmy Kennedy
- Ernesto Lecuona
- Joni Mitchell
- Phil Spector

=== 1998 ===
- John Barry
- Dave Bartholomew
- Fats Domino
- Larry Stock
- John Williams

=== 1999 ===
- Bobby Darin
- Peggy Lee
- Tim Rice
- Bruce Springsteen

== 2000s ==
Return to top of page

=== 2000 ===
- James Brown
- Glenn Frey (Eagles)
- Don Henley (Eagles)
- Curtis Mayfield
- James Taylor
- Brian Wilson

=== 2001 ===
- Eric Clapton
- Willie Nelson
- Dolly Parton
- Diane Warren
- Paul Williams

=== 2002 ===
- Nickolas Ashford
- Michael Jackson
- Barry Manilow
- Randy Newman
- Valerie Simpson
- Sting

=== 2003 ===
- Phil Collins
- John Deacon (Queen)
- Little Richard
- Brian May (Queen)
- Freddie Mercury (Queen)
- Van Morrison
- Roger Taylor (Queen)

=== 2004 ===
- Charles Fox
- Al Green
- Daryl Hall
- Don McLean
- John Oates
- Barrett Strong
- Norman Whitfield

=== 2005 ===
- David Bowie
- Steve Cropper
- John Fogerty
- Isaac Hayes
- David Porter
- Richard M. Sherman
- Robert B. Sherman
- Bill Withers

=== 2006 ===
- Thom Bell
- Henry Cosby
- Mac Davis
- Will Jennings
- Sylvia Moy

=== 2007 ===
- Don Black
- Irving Burgie
- Jackson Browne
- Merle Haggard
- Michael Masser
- Teddy Randazzo
- Bobby Weinstein

=== 2008 ===
- Desmond Child
- Albert Hammond
- Loretta Lynn
- Alan Menken
- John Sebastian
- John Rzeznik

=== 2009 ===
- Jon Bon Jovi (Bon Jovi)
- Eddie Brigati
- Felix Cavaliere
- Roger Cook
- David Crosby
- Roger Greenaway
- Galt MacDermot
- Graham Nash
- James Rado
- Gerome Ragni
- Richie Sambora (Bon Jovi)
- Stephen Schwartz
- Stephen Stills

== 2010s ==
Return to top of page

=== 2010 ===
- Tom Adair
- Philip Bailey (Earth, Wind & Fire)
- Leonard Cohen
- Matt Dennis
- Jackie DeShannon
- Larry Dunn (Earth, Wind & Fire)
- David Foster
- Johnny Mandel
- Bob Marley
- Al McKay (Earth, Wind & Fire)
- Laura Nyro
- Sunny Skylar
- Jesse Stone
- Maurice White (Earth, Wind & Fire)
- Verdine White (Earth, Wind & Fire)

=== 2011 ===
- John Bettis
- Garth Brooks
- Tom Kelly
- Leon Russell
- Billy Steinberg
- Allen Toussaint

=== 2012 ===
- Tom Jones
- Don Schlitz
- Bob Seger
- Gordon Lightfoot
- Harvey Schmidt
- Jim Steinman

=== 2013 ===
- Lou Gramm (Foreigner)
- Tony Hatch
- Mick Jones (Foreigner)
- Holly Knight
- Joe Perry (Aerosmith)
- JD Souther
- Steven Tyler (Aerosmith)

=== 2014 ===
- Ray Davies (The Kinks)
- Donovan
- Graham Gouldman
- Mark James
- Jim Weatherly

=== 2015 ===
- Bobby Braddock
- Willie Dixon
- Jerry Garcia
- Robert Hunter
- Toby Keith
- Cyndi Lauper
- Linda Perry

=== 2016 ===
- Elvis Costello
- Bernard Edwards
- Marvin Gaye
- Tom Petty
- Nile Rodgers
- Chip Taylor

=== 2017 ===
- Babyface
- Peter Cetera (Chicago)
- Berry Gordy
- Jimmy Jam and Terry Lewis
- Jay Z
- Robert Lamm (Chicago)
- Max Martin
- James Pankow (Chicago)

=== 2018 ===
- Bill Anderson
- Robert "Kool" Bell (Kool & the Gang)
- Ronald Bell (Kool & the Gang)
- George Brown (Kool & the Gang)
- Steve Dorff
- Jermaine Dupri
- Alan Jackson
- John Mellencamp
- James "J.T." Taylor (Kool & the Gang)
- Allee Willis

=== 2019 ===
- Dallas Austin
- Missy Elliott
- Tom T. Hall
- John Prine
- Cat Stevens
- Jack Tempchin

== 2020s ==
Return to top of page

=== 2022 ===
- Mariah Carey
- Chad Hugo (The Neptunes)
- The Isley Brothers
- Annie Lennox (Eurythmics)
- Steve Miller
- Rick Nowels
- William "Mickey" Stevenson
- David A. Stewart (Eurythmics)
- Pharrell Williams (The Neptunes)

=== 2023 ===
- Glen Ballard
- Snoop Dogg
- Gloria Estefan
- Jeff Lynne (Electric Light Orchestra)
- Teddy Riley
- Liz Rose
- Sade

=== 2024 ===
- Walter Becker (Steely Dan)
- Bill Berry (R.E.M.)
- Peter Buck (R.E.M.)
- Donald Fagen (Steely Dan)
- Hillary Lindsey
- Mike Mills (R.E.M.)
- Prince
- Dean Pitchford
- Michael Stipe (R.E.M.)
- Timbaland
- Cindy Walker

=== 2025 ===
- Bert Berns
- George Clinton
- Luigi Creatore
- Ashley Gorley
- Rodney Jerkins
- Tom Johnston (The Doobie Brothers)
- Mike Love (The Beach Boys)
- Tony Macaulay
- Michael McDonald (The Doobie Brothers)
- Hugo Peretti
- Jerry Ragovoy
- Patrick Simmons (The Doobie Brothers)
- Donna Summer

=== 2026 ===
- Walter Afanasieff
- Terry Britten
- Kenny Loggins
- Graham Lyle
- Alanis Morissette
- Gene Simmons (Kiss)
- Paul Stanley (Kiss)
- Christopher "Tricky" Stewart
- Taylor Swift
