= El puñao de rosas =

Zarzuela by Ruperto Chapí (1902)

- Zarzuela by Ruperto Chapí
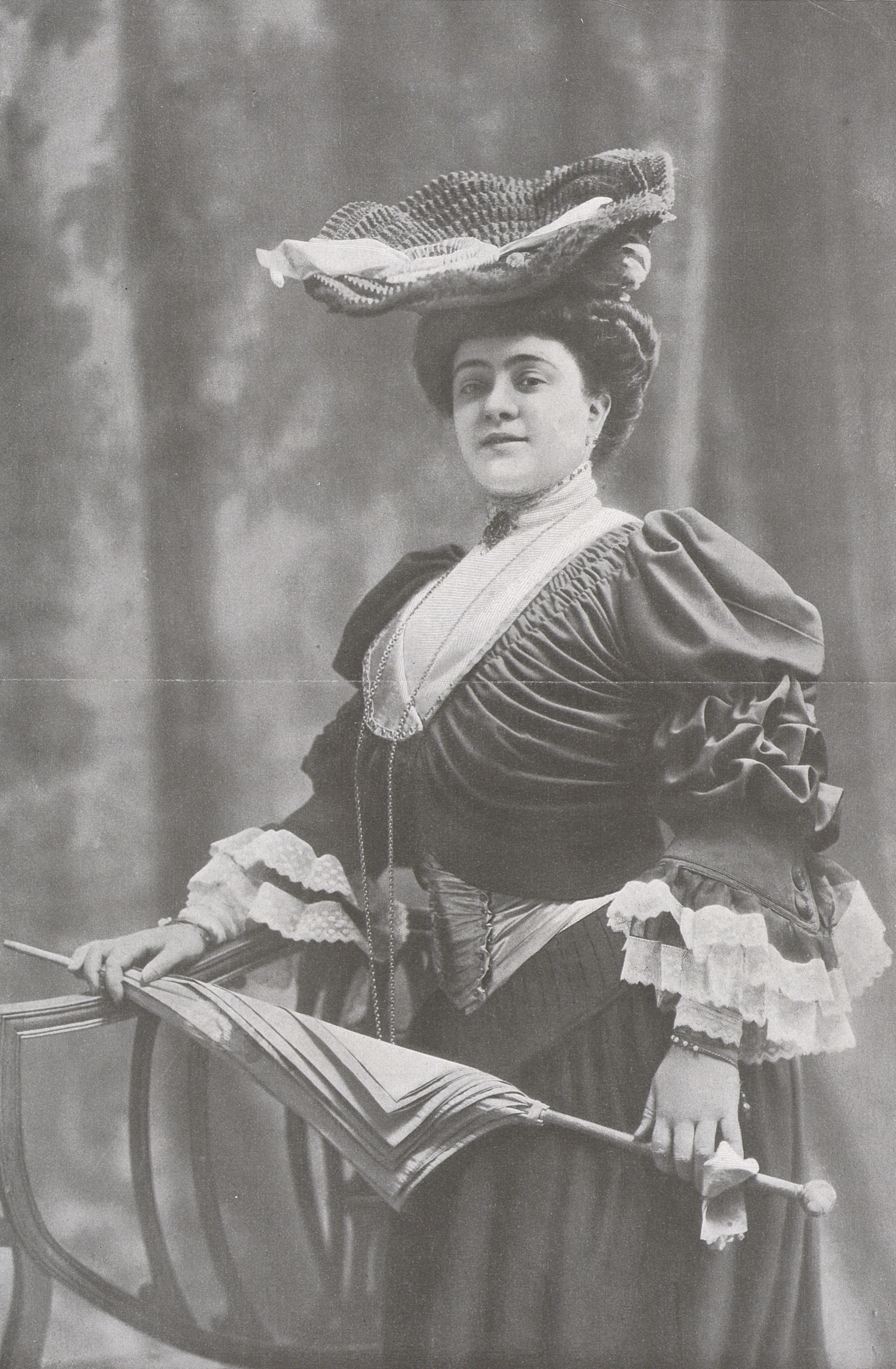
- Isabel Brú, who created the role of Rosario, photograph by Kaulak (1905)
- Translation: A Bunch of Roses
- Librettist: Carlos Arniches; Ramón Asensio Más
- Language: Spanish
- Premiere: 30 October 1902; Teatro Apolo, Madrid

El puñao de rosas (A Bunch of Roses) is a one-act zarzuela "of Andalusian customs" (de costumbres andaluzas) by Spanish composer Ruperto Chapí to a libretto by Carlos Arniches and Ramón Asensio Más. It was successfully premiered on 30 October 1902, at the Teatro Apolo in Madrid. A parody zarzuela, El cuñao de Rosa (The brother-in-law of Rosa), with text by Candela and Merino and music by Tomás López Torregrosa, was staged in February next year.

== Roles ==
Role	Voice type	Premiere cast, 30 October 1902
Rosario, daughter of the cortijo overseer	soprano	Isabel Brú
Carmen (Carmencilla), Rosario's cousin	comic soprano	María López Martínez
A gypsy girl (Socorro)	soprano	Carmen Calvo
Señó Juan, the overseer of the cortijo, Rosario's father	singing actor	José Mesejo
Tarugo, Rosario's lover	baritone	Bonifacio Pinedo
José Antonio, Tarugo's brother	singing actor	José Luiz Ontiveros
Pepe, young master of the cortijo	baritone	Juan Reforzo
Francisquito		Antonio Pérez Juste
Three Huntsmen	3 tenors, 2 of which are comic	Vicente Carrión, Isidro Soler, Melchor Ramiro
Two friends		Emilio de Francisco, Luis Ballester
An arriero	tenor	Isidoro Soler
Chorus: girls and lads

== Music ==
There are six musical numbers. The introduction (No. 1) has a sort orchestral prelude, which is followed by an elaborate opening scene: Socorro's prediction is inserted into the chorus, and when she leaves, another chorus tune frames Rosario and Carmencilla's parts with Socorro's song (whose tune is that of the orchestral introduction) interrupting this scene twice. The same song is put into Rosario and Tarugo's duo (No. 2), the finale and culminative section of which is a zapateado. The second duo (No. 3) is in ABA_{1}B_{1} form with a bolero in the B section. No. 4 is actually a sequence of separate scenes: a male chorus nocturne (with a habanera rhythm in orchestra) gives place to an agitated female chorus, which is followed by an arriero's tune. After this a comic trio is presented without any transition. No. 5 is famous for its final tanguillo performed by Carmencilla, and it is preceded by an introductive chorus and Rosario's copla. No. 6 is just a minute long and is not an independent piece: it is based on the A_{1} section from No. 3. For the Finale a variation of the concluding measures of No. 1 (Socorro's song tune) is used.

=== Musical numbers ===
- No. 1. Introduction and chorus. Una gitana vieja me dijo un día (Rosario, Socorro, Carmencilla, female chorus)
- No. 2. Duo. ¡Ay! Mare del alma mía, que güen porveni me espera (Rosario, Tarugo, with Socorro behind the scenes)
- No. 3. Duo. No te asustes tú, alma mía (Rosario, Pepe)
- No. 4 (a). Chorus:
  - Va la tarde cayendo (male chorus, behind the scenes) —
  - Como bandá de palomas (female chorus) —
  - Arrierito, arriero, ¡mal haya tu suerte perra! (un arriero, behind the scenes) —
- No. 4 (b). Trio. Con perro, escopeta, morral y canana (los cazadores)
- No. 5. Tango:
  - ¡Venga jaleo! ¡Venga jarana! (mixed chorus, with Rosario, El Señó Juan) —
  - Yo sufro mientras tu gosas (Rosario, with Carmencilla, Pepe, mixed chorus) —
  - No le cuentes ar cura, chiquiya (Carmencilla, with mixed chorus)
- No. 6. Scene. ¡Naide! ¡Toó está tranquilo! (Tarugo)
- Finale (instrumental)

=== Arrangements ===
Chapí composed a Pasodoble based on several tunes of the zarzuela. Ricardo Villa, a prominent wind band director, arranged Nos. 1 and 3 of the zarzuela making up a Fantasy.

== Recordings ==
The order of the roles: Rosario – Socorro – Carmencilla – Pepe – Tarugo – 3 Huntsmen – An arriero.

- Columbia 1953: Ana María Iriarte, Pilar Lorengar, Teresa Berganza, Manuel Ausensi, Arturo Díaz Martos, Juan Encabo, Gregorio Gil, Agustín S. Luque. Chorus: Cantores de Madrid (dir. José Perera). Gran Orquesta da Cámara de Madrid. Ataúlfo Argenta (conductor). — No. 6 not recorded.
- Zafiro 1959: Dolores Pérez (Lily Berchman), Delian Rubens, Emilia Rincón, Tino Moro, Eladio Cuevas, Santiago Ramalle, Tino Pardo, Fernando Hernández. Chorus: Coros de Radio Nacional de España. Orquesta de Cámara de Madrid. Enrique Navarro (conductor). — No. 1 is recorded with cuts (about half of its normal duration). This recording contains also the Pasadoble based on the tunes of the zarzuela.
- Alhambra 1970: Carmen Sinovas, Pura María Martínez, Isabel Higueras, Antonio Blancas, José Peromingo, Juanito Navarro, Manolo Codeso, Alfonso del Real, Aurelio Rodríguez. Chorus: Cantores de Madrid (dir. José Perera). Orquesta Filarmonía de España. Rafael Frühbeck de Burgos (conductor). — No. 6 and Finale not recorded.

The Pasodoble was recorded several times in different versions (orchestra, sextet etc.).
