= List of awards and nominations received by Jon Bon Jovi =

Jon Bon Jovi awards and nominations
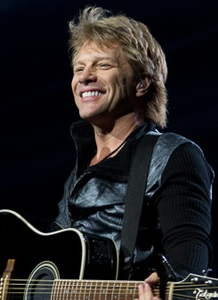
- Jon Bon Jovi performing in 2013
Awards and nominations
| Award | Wins | Nominations |
| American Music Awards | 1 | 1 |
| Brit | 1 | 1 |
| Grammy | 0 | 2 |
| MTV Europe | 1 | 1 |
| MTV VMA | 0 | 2 |
| Academy Awards | 0 | 1 |
| Golden Globe Award | 1 | 2 |

Totals (Note: Certain award groups do not simply award one winner. They acknowledge several different recipients, have runners-up, and have third place. Since this is a specific recognition and is different from losing an award, runner-up mentions are considered wins in this award tally. For simplification and to avoid errors, each award in this list has been presumed to have had a prior nomination.)
- Wins: 4
- Nominations: 10

The following is a list of awards and nominations received by Jon Bon Jovi throughout his career.

== Academy Awards ==
| Year | Nominee / work | Award | Result |
|---|---|---|---|
| 1991 | "Blaze of Glory" | Best Original Song | Nominated |

== ASCAP Latin Awards ==
| Year | Nominee / work | Award | Result |
|---|---|---|---|
| 2008 | "Como Yo Nadie Te Ha Amado" | Pop/Ballad | Won |

== American Music Awards ==
| Year | Nominee / work | Award | Result |
|---|---|---|---|
| 1991 | "Blaze of Glory" | Favorite Pop/Rock Song | Won |

== Arena Football League ==
| Year | Nominee / work | Award | Result |
|---|---|---|---|
| 2008 | ArenaBowl XXII | Foster Trophy (as owner of the Philadelphia Soul) | Philadelphia Soul 59 – San Jose SaberCats 56 |

== Brit Awards ==
| Year | Nominee / work | Award | Result |
|---|---|---|---|
| 1991 | Himself | International Male Solo Artist | Nominated |
| 1998 | Himself | International Male Solo Artist | Won |

== Grammy Awards ==
| Year | Nominee / work | Award | Result |
|---|---|---|---|
| 1991 | "Blaze of Glory" | Best Male Rock Vocal Performance | Nominated |
| 1991 | "Blaze of Glory" | Best Song Written for Visual Media | Nominated |

== Golden Globe Awards ==
| Year | Nominee / work | Award | Result |
|---|---|---|---|
| 1991 | "Blaze of Glory" | Best Original Song | Won |
| 2012 | "Not Running Anymore" | Best Original Song | Nominated |

== MTV Europe Music Awards ==
| Year | Nominee / work | Award | Result |
|---|---|---|---|
| 1997 | Himself | Best Male | Won |

== MTV Video Music Awards ==
| Year | Nominee / work | Award | Result |
|---|---|---|---|
| 1991 | "Blaze of Glory" | Best Male Video | Nominated |
| 1991 | "Blaze of Glory" | Best Video from a Film | Nominated |

== MusiCares ==
| Year | Nominee / work | Award | Result |
|---|---|---|---|
| 2024 | Himself | MusiCares Person of the Year | Won |

== Rock and Roll Hall of Fame ==
| Year | Nominee / work | Award | Result |
|---|---|---|---|
| 2018 | Himself | Inductee | Won |

== Songwriters Hall of Fame ==
| Year | Nominee / work | Award | Result |
|---|---|---|---|
| 2009 | Himself | Inductee | Won |
