= Carsten Woll =

American opera singer

Carsten Thorvald Woll
- Born: Carsten Thorvald Woll; July 31, 1885; Oslo, Norway
- Died: December 21, 1962 (aged 77); Eugene, Oregon
- Occupations: composer, singer, teacher
- Spouse: Esther Erhart Woll

Carsten Thorvald Woll (1885-1962) was a leading Norwegian-American singer and recording artist of the 1910s and 1920s.

== Biography ==
The singer and composer Carsten Woll was born in Oslo, Norway. He took his student exams in 1903 and subsequently studied music and voice in Denmark and Germany.

Woll immigrated to America in 1913 and was a professor first at Luther Seminary in St. Paul, Minnesota and then at St. Olaf College in Northfield, Minnesota. In 1926 he also became the director of the Woll Music Studio in Minot, North Dakota. After retiring as a teacher of singing and music at St. Olaf College in 1951, he moved to Eugene, Oregon.

== Music ==
Carsten Woll was one of the big names in Norwegian-American music with nearly two thousand live performances and frequent appearances at choral festivals. He wrote several songs and compiled a songbook that was published by the Sons of Norway in 1926. There were over one hundred Norwegian songs in the collection as well as Home, Sweet Home and the songs of Stephen Foster.

Woll's popularity as a singer made him one of the most sought-after Norwegian-American recording artists in the acoustic period. From 1913 to 1925 he recorded almost 200 titles for a number of record companies. Most of his recordings were made for Victor and Columbia, but he also appeared on the Edison, Vocalion, Okeh and Brunswick labels.

Norwegian immigrants in America had a strong emotional attachment to the folk melodies of their homeland, and Carsten Woll probably made more recordings of traditional Norwegian folk songs than any other artist. His discography included Eg gjette Tulla, Eg veit ei lita jente, Kjerringa med staven and Og reven lå under birkerot. On the other hand, his recording of Sommersol til siste stund was a Norwegian version of Silver threads among the gold.

== See also ==
- Carl G. O. Hansen

== Gallery ==
Carsten Woll in Victor catalog

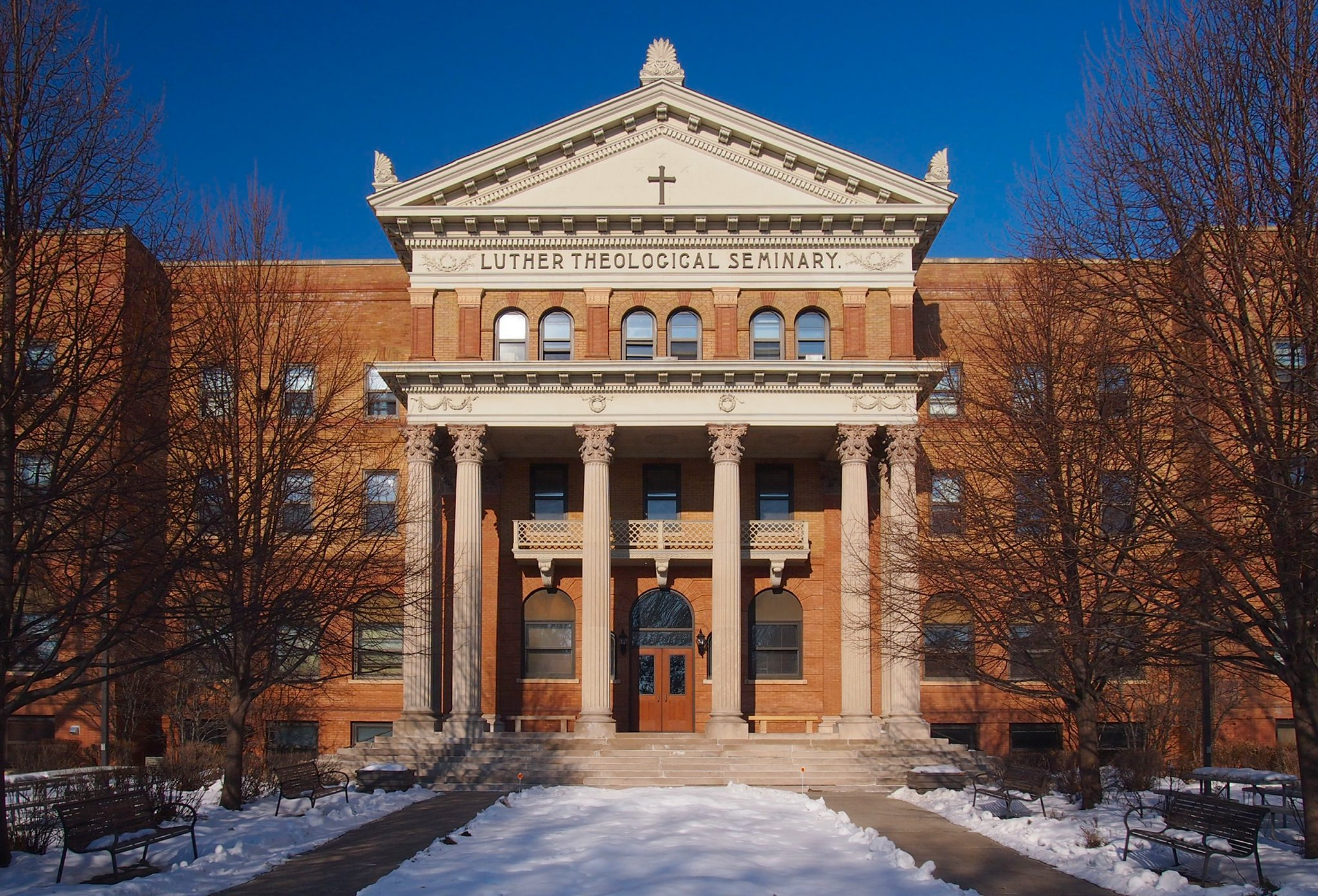
Luther Seminary

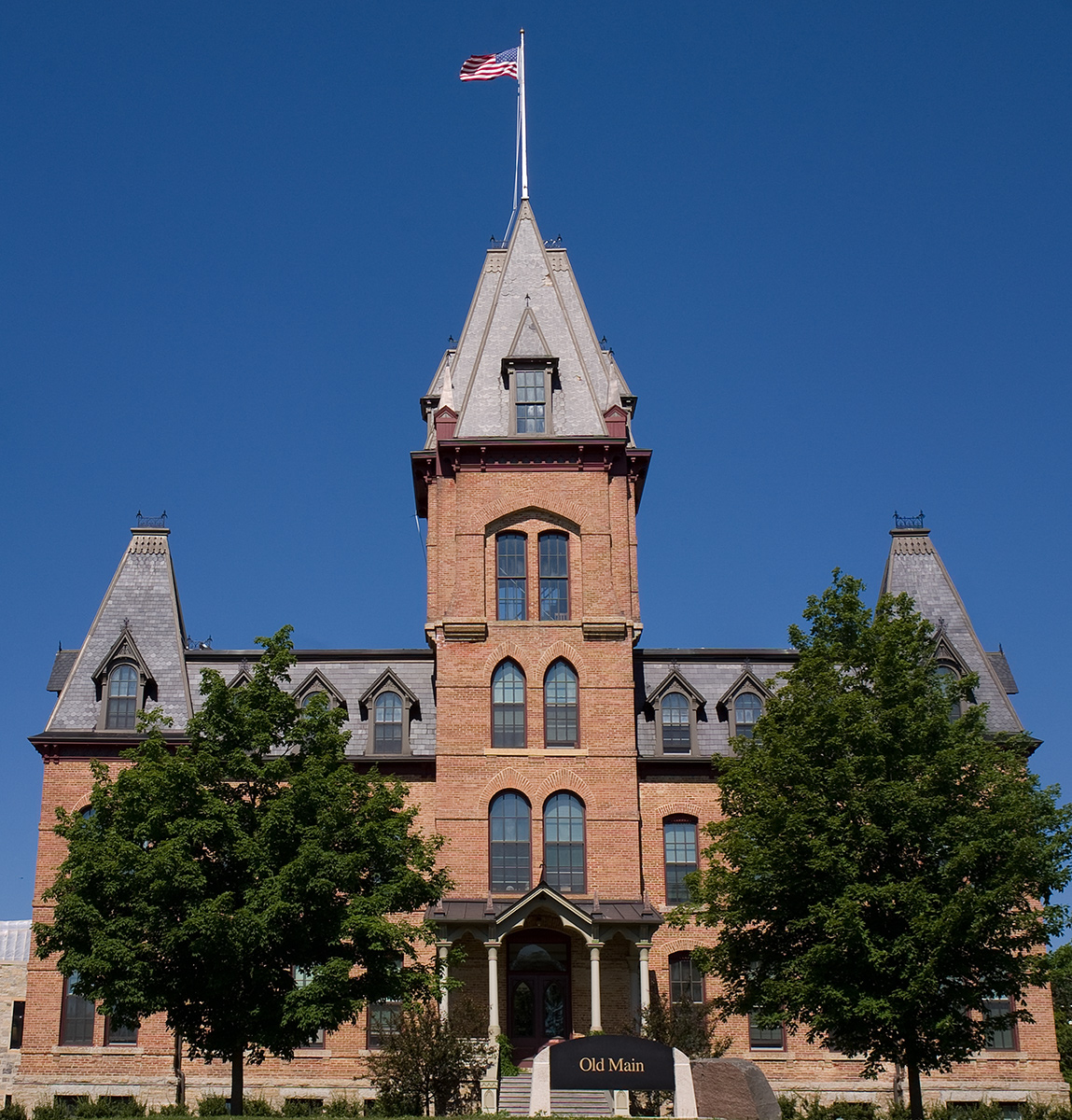
St. Olaf College

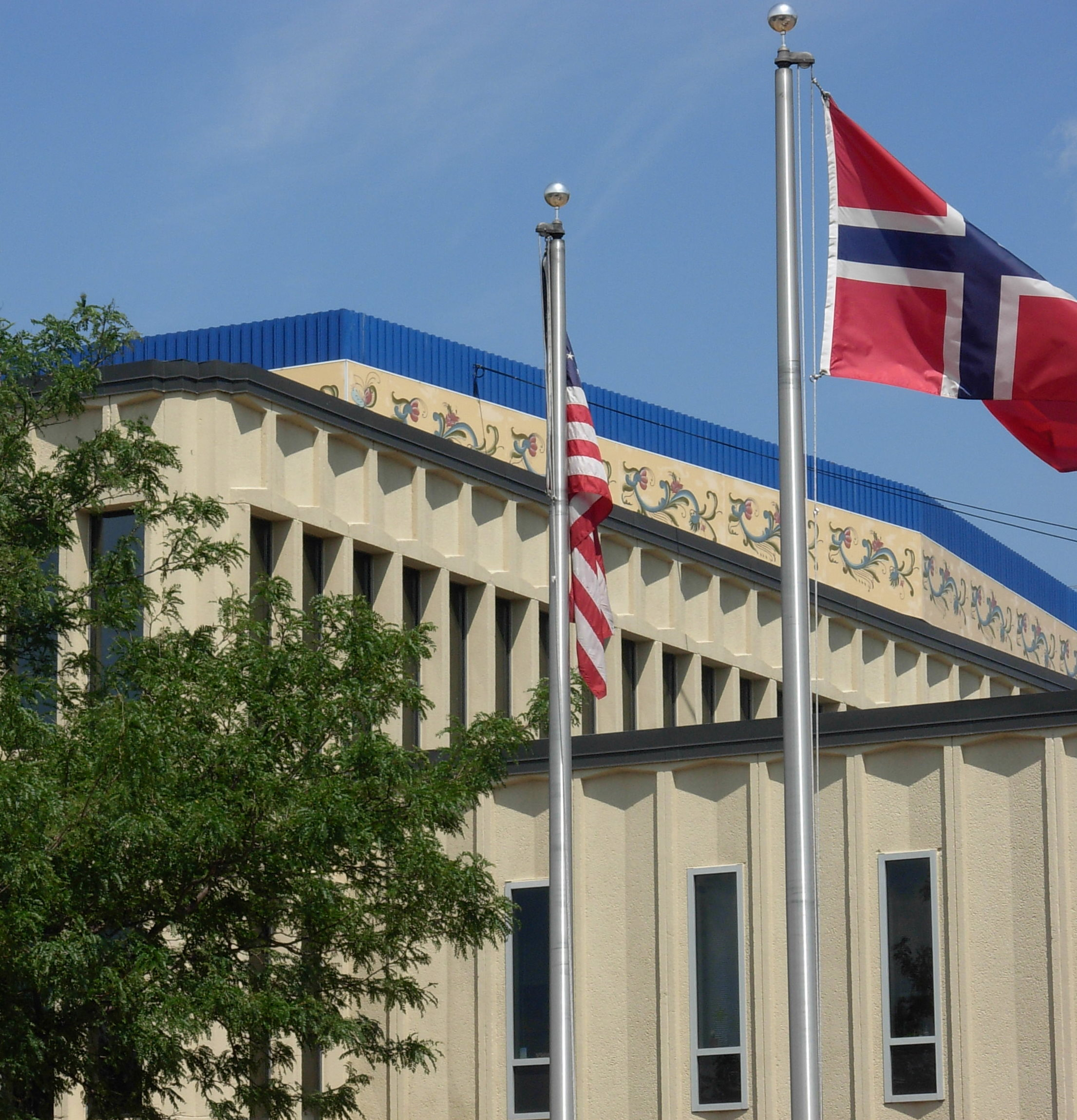
Sons of Norway headquarters
