= Dardagny Castle =

Swiss castle in Geneva

Coordinates: 46°11′39″N 5°59′43″E

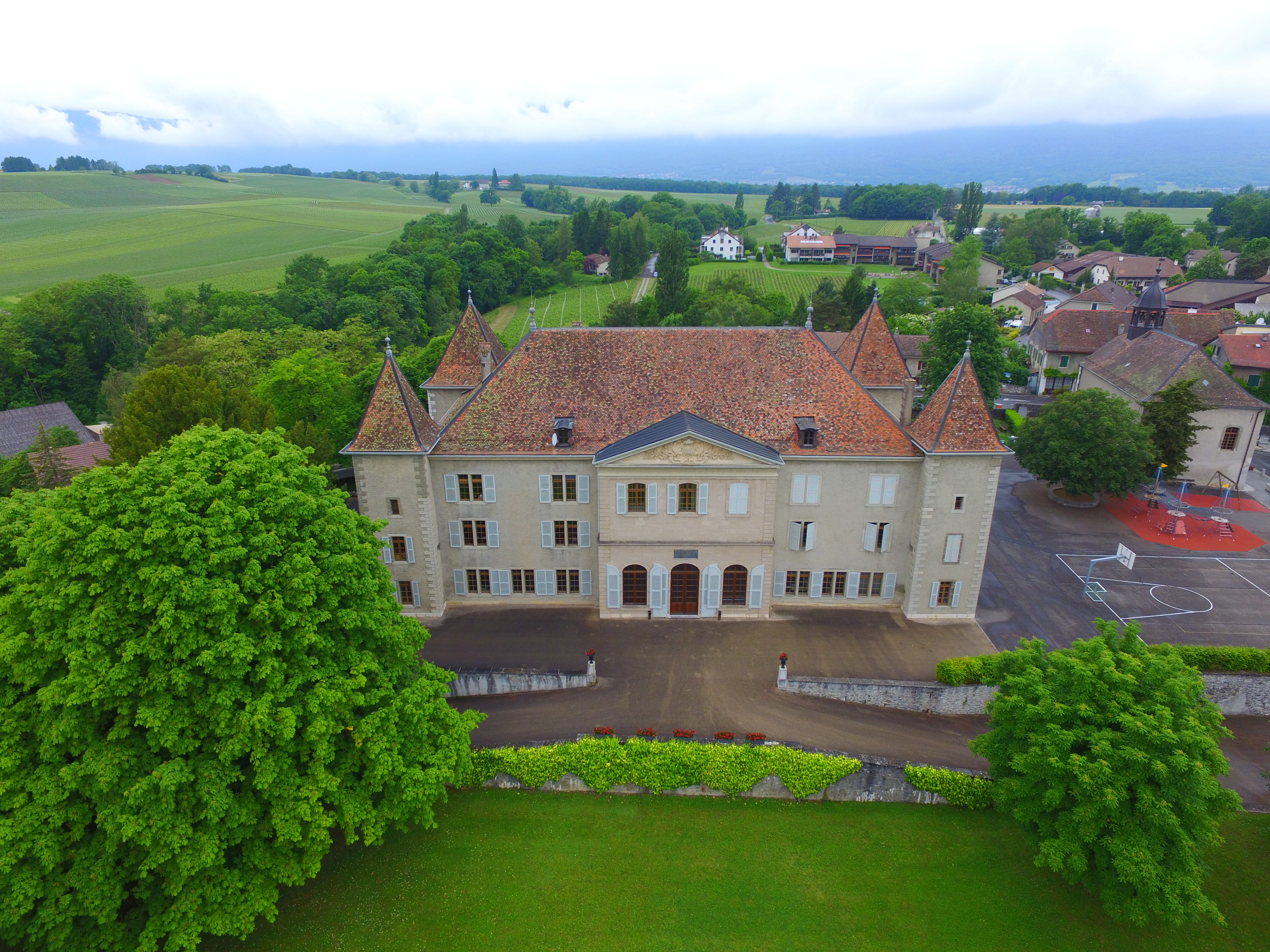
Dardagny Castle

Dardagny Castle (French: Château de Dardagny) is a castle in the municipality of Dardagny in the canton of Geneva, Switzerland. It is a Swiss heritage site of national significance.

== History ==
Built in the 13th century, Dardagny Castle initially formed part of a fortification system protecting the western border of the Bishop of Geneva's lands, along with the Bruël, La Corbière and Malval castles. It consisted of two fortified houses separated by an alley in 1298, each belonging to one of the two lordships of Dardagny. In the 14th century, the southern building was more than two stories high and possessed a tower. In 1646, the Favre family inherited both parts of the fief and, in 1655, connected the two houses into a single castle, adding more floors and three corner towers.

In 1721, the castle passed to Jean Vasserot, who closed the inner courtyard and turned it into a function hall, decorated with Italianate paintings. The central turret was replaced by an interior staircase in 1740, giving Dardagny Castle its current appearance. The castle was bought by the municipality of Dardagny in 1904 and restored between 1926 and 1932, after authorities had considered demolishing it. It has since housed the town hall and school.

== See also ==
- List of castles and fortresses in Switzerland
