= Charles Samuel Bovy-Lysberg =

Swiss pianist and composer (1821–1873)

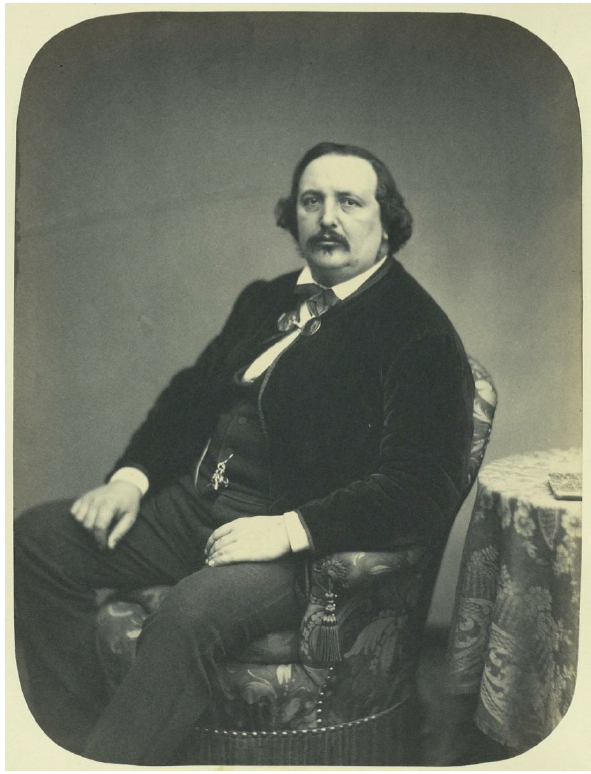
- Bovy-Lysberg before 1857 (from the collections of the Bibliothèque de Genève)

Background information
- Origin: Geneva

Charles Samuel Bovy-Lysberg (Charles Lysberg) (1 February 1821 – 15 February 1873) was a Swiss pianist and composer.

== Biography ==
He was born in Geneva and received his early music education there. In 1835 he went to Paris, where he studied under Frédéric Chopin and met Franz Liszt. The latter was particularly supportive and helped publish Bovy-Lysberg's Les Suissesses, Op. 1, a set of waltzes for piano. By mid-1840s Bovy-Lysberg was becoming a well-known teacher and performer in Paris, but after the French Revolution of 1848 he had to leave for his home town. He got married in 1848 and settled in his wife's castle in Dardagny, near Geneva. He stayed there for the rest of his life, frequently giving recitals in Geneva and the neighbouring towns, organizing concerts and publishing his music. He also taught at the Geneva Conservatory in 1848–9 and 1870–3. He composed more than 150 pieces, most of them short works for piano, very popular in Geneva salons of his time, but almost completely unknown today. A street in Geneva is named after him, rue Bovy-Lysberg.

== Selected works ==
=== Piano ===
- Op. 1. Les Suissesses. 5 Valses brillantes.
- Op. 3. 4 Romances (I. A Marie. II. Rêve. III. Espoir. IV. Souvenir)
- Op. 4. Le Lac de Brientz. Quadrille
- Op. 6. Les Amaranthes. 4 Valses brillantes.
- Op. 8. Les Roses d'automne. Valses brillantes.
- Op. 9. La Reine des Prés. Valse brillante.
- Op. 10. Trois nocturnes
- Op. 11. Fantaisie
- Op. 14. Six Etudes de Salon
- Op. 15. 4 Romances
- Op. 16. Fantaisie sur: Guillaume Tell de Rossini
- Op. 17. Rose des Alpes. Valse brillante.
- Op. 18. 6 Caprices
- Op. 20. Etude pour la Maine gauche seule.
- Op. 21. Fantaisie brillante sur la cavatine fav. de La Niobe de Pacini
- Op. 23. Divertissement brillante.
- Op. 25. Deuxieme barcarolle
- Op. 26. La Napolitana. Etude de Légèreté.
- Op. 27. 3 Romances sans paroles (I. Regrets. II. Invocation. III. Aveu)
- Op. 28. Terpsichore. Caprice.
- Op. 29. Deux Nocturnes
- Op. 30. 3 Romances sans paroles (I. Près d'une chapelle. II. Soir d'Automne. III. Rayon de Bonheur)
- Op. 31. Sérénade.
- Op. 32. Tarantelle.
- Op. 33. Carillon. Impromptu.
- Op. 34. La Fontaine. Idylle.
- Op. 35. Bohémienne. Caprice.
- Op. 36. 2 Rêveries (I. Le Crépuscule. II. L'Aube)
- Op. 37. Le Tornoi. Poème musical.
- Op. 38. Romanesca
- Op. 39. Réveil des Oiseaux. Idylle.
- Op. 40. Le Hamac. Berceuse.
- Op. 41. Fantaisie sur des Airs suisses
- Op. 42. Danse arménienne.
- Op. 43. Menuet dans le style ancien.
- Op. 44. Caprice silésien.
- Op. 45. Fantaisie. Galop.
- Op. 46. Pensées de Mai. 2 Romances sans paroles.
- Op. 47. Un Rêve d'enfant. Mélodie.
- Op. 48. Valse brillante.
- Op. 49. Fantaisie brillante sur Le Fanchonnette de Clapisson
- Op. 50. Allegro de concert
- Op. 51. La Baladine. Caprice
- Op. 52. Fantaisie alpestre
- Op. 53. Valse brillante.
- Op. 54. Chant d'Appenzell. Bluette brillante.
- Op. 55. Chant du Nautonnier. Barcarolle.
- Op. 56. Océan. Méditation.
- Op. 57. L'Amazone. Caprice.
- Op. 58. L'Angelus du Matin
- Op. 59. Le Tic-tac du moulin
- Op. 60. Menuet
- Op. 61. Reflets intimes. 3 Mélodies. (I. Céleste quiétude. II. Mes Rêves chéris. III. Au Printemps.)
- Op. 62. Idylle
- Op. 63. Giovinetta. Impromptu-Galop.
- Op. 64. La Moldavienne. Fantaisie.
- Op. 66. La Bayadère. Caprice du genre.
- Op. 67. Berceuse
- Op. 68. La Ballerina. Caprice de genre
- Op. 74. La Coucaratcha. Fantaisie
- Op. 77. L'écharpe blanche. Valse de salon. (publ. by P. Jürgenson, ca1871)
- Op. 78. Ressouvenir. Ballade
- Op. 79. Morceau de Concert sur Don Juan de Mozart, pour 2 Pianos
- Op. 82. Boléro
- Op. 83. Airs savoisiens, variés
- Op. 86. La Rêveuse
- Op. 89. Souvenir de Don Juan
- Op. 89. Le départ du hameau. Mélodie
- Op. 94. Sur l'onde.
- Op. 99. Fantaisie surl'opera Faust
- Op. 106. Polonaise
- Op. 107. La Chasse
- Op. 111. Pensierosa. Valse sentimentale
- Op. 117. Quatrième valse de salon
- Op. 122. Chanson du gondolier
- Op. 124. Expansion nr1
- Op. 126. La balancelle. Caprice imitatif nr1
- Op. 130. Valse styrienne. a 4 mains
- Op. 135. La captive
- Op. 140. Andante
- Op. 145. En songeant a Chopin
- Op. 148. Esquisse musicale
- Op. 149. Deux idylles
- Op. 153. Confidence
- Op. 155. Vielle histoire
- Le chant du rouet
- Au bord du lac. Marche des bersaglieri
- Marche des chevaliers-gardes. a 4 mains

=== Stage ===
- La fille du carillonneur, comic opera (first performance 1854)
- Les Alpes, cantata (1860)
