= Silver Threads Among the Gold =

Song
- Language: English
- Published: 1873 by Charles W. Harris
- Composer: H.P. Danks
- Lyricist: Eben E. Rexford

"Silver Threads Among the Gold", first copyrighted in 1873, is a song that was popular in the United States in the late 19th and early 20th centuries. Today it is a standard of barbershop quartet singing. The lyrics are by Eben E. Rexford, and the music by Hart Pease Danks.

== Background ==
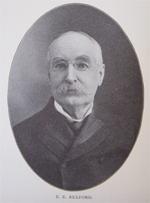
Eben Eugene Rexford

In 1930, an Associated Press story published in The New York Times gave some background on the writing of the lyrics of the song:

"Silver Threads Song Traced to Poet’s ‘Re-Hash’ on Order"

Shiocton, Wis. (AP).—The love ballad, “Silver Threads Among the Gold,” which has stirred the hearts of more than one generation, was not the inspiration of an aging poet but a “re-hash” produced on order.

The story developed after the unveiling of a monument here in honor of the author of the words, Eben E. Rexford, who died in 1916.

Rexford made a living by writing verse and flower and garden articles for magazines. When he was 18, he wrote and sold for $3 some verses entitled “Growing Old.”

Later, H. P. Danks, composer of the music for “Silver Threads,” wrote to him requesting words for a song. Rexford dug into his scrapbook and revised “Growing Old.”

When Rexford spoke about the song, he explained that he worked his way through college by writing, and it was when he was in college that Danks sent him a request for lyrics, offering to pay three dollars for each song. Rexford submitted nine songs and received $18.00, but no accounting of which six had been accepted or which three had been rejected. In telling the story of the song, Rexford said that he didn't know whether he had been paid $3.00 for it or nothing, since he didn't know if it had been among the six accepted or the three rejected. Rexford first heard the song when a company of Oneida Indians gave a concert in Shiocton, Wisconsin, and sang it there.

The sheer popularity of the song can be illustrated, among other ways, by news stories which continued to reference it for many years. For example, in 1932, it won a poll of WABC (AM) (New York) listeners asked to name their favorite songs, despite its being 60 years old.

== Recordings ==
The song was the most frequently recorded song of the acoustic recording era, starting with its first known recording by Richard Jose in 1903.

Later 20th-century recordings of the song include those of John McCormack, Bing Crosby (recorded November 8, 1947), Jerry Lee Lewis (1956 and 1973), Georg Ots (in Estonian and Finnish, 1958), Tapio Rautavaara (in Finnish, 1967) and Jo Stafford with Paul Weston's Orchestra and the Gaslight Singers (1969).

== Versions ==
In 1960, Pat Boone released a new-lyrics version of this song, titled "Words" and credited to James Cavanaugh and C. Notelgnis.

== Lyrics ==
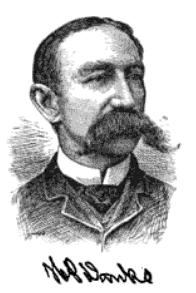
Hart Pease Danks

The lyrics are as follows:

Darling, I am growing old,
Silver threads among the gold,
Shine upon my brow today,
Life is fading fast away.
But, my darling, you will be,
Always young and fair to me,
Yes, my darling, you will be
Always young and fair to me.

Chorus:
Darling, I am growing old,
Silver threads among the gold,
Shine upon my brow today;
Life is fading fast away.

When your hair is silver white,
And your cheeks no longer bright,
With the roses of the May,
I will kiss your lips and say,
Oh! My darling, mine alone, alone,
You have never older grown!
Yes, my darling, mine alone,
You have never older grown!

chorus

Love can never more grow old,
Locks may lose their brown and gold;
Cheeks may fade and hollow grow,
But the hearts that love will know,
Never, never winter’s frost and chill;
Summer warmth is in them still;
Never winter’s frost and chill,
Summer warmth is in them still.

chorus

== Related to the song ==
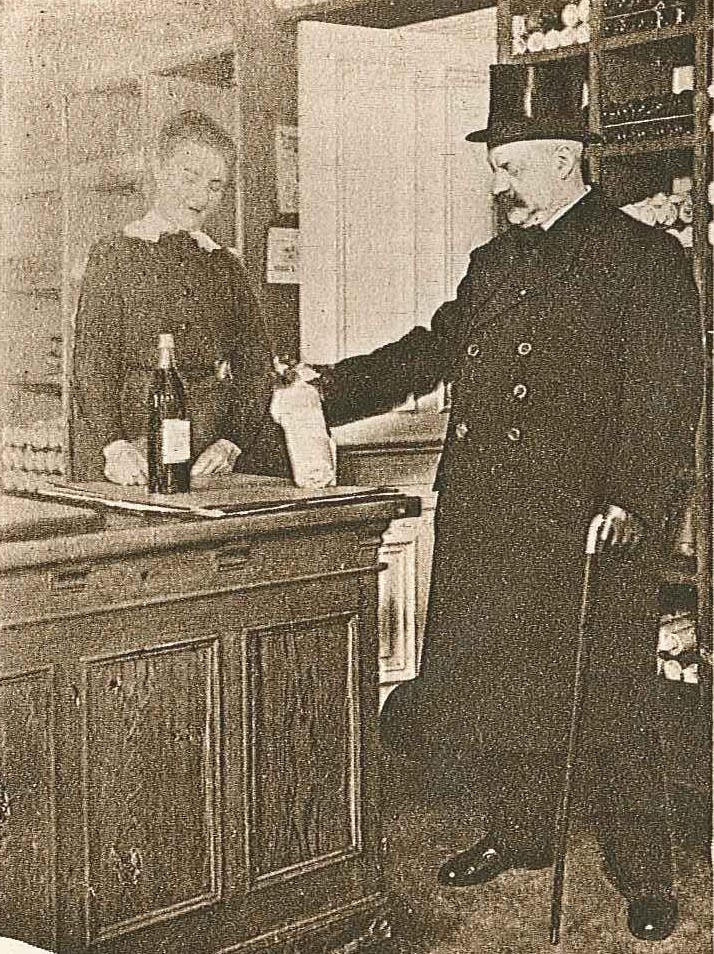
Emil Norlander

- In the late 19th century Eben Rexford wrote a number of stories published in the magazine Girls of Today, a Beadle and Adams publication. In 1876, three years after the publication of the song, Mattie Dyers Britts published a story in Girls of Today entitled “Silver Threads Among the Gold.”
- The metaphor of silver threads was used in an Italian song of the time, “Threads of Silver,” but the theme of that song is quite different from the theme of “Silver Threads Among the Gold.” In the Italian song, “Each thread of silver is a love once vainly plighted, . . . Each an illusion blighted, . . . Fated dreams undone.”
- The Swedish journalist and revue producer Emil Norlander (1865–1935) wrote Swedish lyrics to Danks's melody in the early 20th century. Norlander's version has no contextual similarity to that of Rexford and is instead an appeal for peace. It is titled "Varför skola mänskor strida?" (Why should people fight?) and has remained popular in Sweden to the present, having been recorded by several well-known artists.
- There were also Norwegian versions of the Rexford–Danks song that were popular in Norway and America. In 1919 Carsten Woll recorded a translation, Sommersol til siste stund. About twenty-five years later Ernest and Clarence Iverson recorded "Ungdoms mynder", which had the same melody but lyrics unrelated to the original song.
- The melody accompanies German lyrics describing the blossoming of love for an Alpine dairy maid in the song "Das Alpenrosenlied", by the German pop and volksmusician Heino, on the 1975 album Seine großen Erfolge 5.
- The song was parodied as "In the Boarding House":

In the boarding house where I live,
Ev'rything is growing old,
Long gray hairs are in the butter,
Silver threads among the gold.
When the dog died,
We had hotdogs,
When the cat died,
Catnip tea,
When the landlord died I left there,
Spareribs were too much for me.

chorus [as above]
