= Virginia Galván de Nava =

Virginia Galván de Nava (1873 – 195?, Mexico City) was a Mexican soprano and voice teacher.

== Biography ==
Virginia Galván de Nava was born in León, Guanajuato, in 1873. From a young age she studied music in her native city at the Academia Municipal. There she studied solfege with Miguel Álvarez who introduced her to opera. She began training in bel canto technique under Álvarez and took part in several school concerts under his direction. She also performed with an orchestra led by Estanislao Cortés.

While still a teenager, Galván de Nava relocated to Mexico City to pursue further training at a music academy run by opera singer Fanny Natali de Testa. She further refined her vocal skills in Mexico City with teachers Eduardo Pierson and Gonzalo Aragón, and studied piano with Carlos J. Meneses. She was a high regarded concert soprano, and performed in operas only rarely. She was married to singer José B. Nava with whom she gave concert tours of the United States; including performances in 1894 at both Odd Fellows Hall in New Orleans and Madison Square Garden in New York City.

Galván de Nava became known as the "Adelina Patti of Mexico" due to her gifts at coloratura. She had a major success at the Teatro Arbeu in Mexico City in 1902 singing the part of the Archangel Gabriel in Jules Massenet's oratorio La Vierge; a part she reprised in 1904. Her opera repertoire included Mimì in La bohème and the title role in Aida. In c. 1908 she recorded seven songs for Columbia Records. These are catalogued in the Discography of American Historical Recordings.

After retiring from performance, Galván de Nava devoted herself to teaching and opened her own singing academy in Mexico City; becoming a lauded teacher of bel canto literature and technique. She also taught on the voice faculty of the Conservatorio Nacional de Música (Mexico). Among her students was soprano Lupe Medina de Ortega.

Virginia Galván de Nava died in Mexico City sometime in the 1950s.
