= Dardagny =

- Municipality
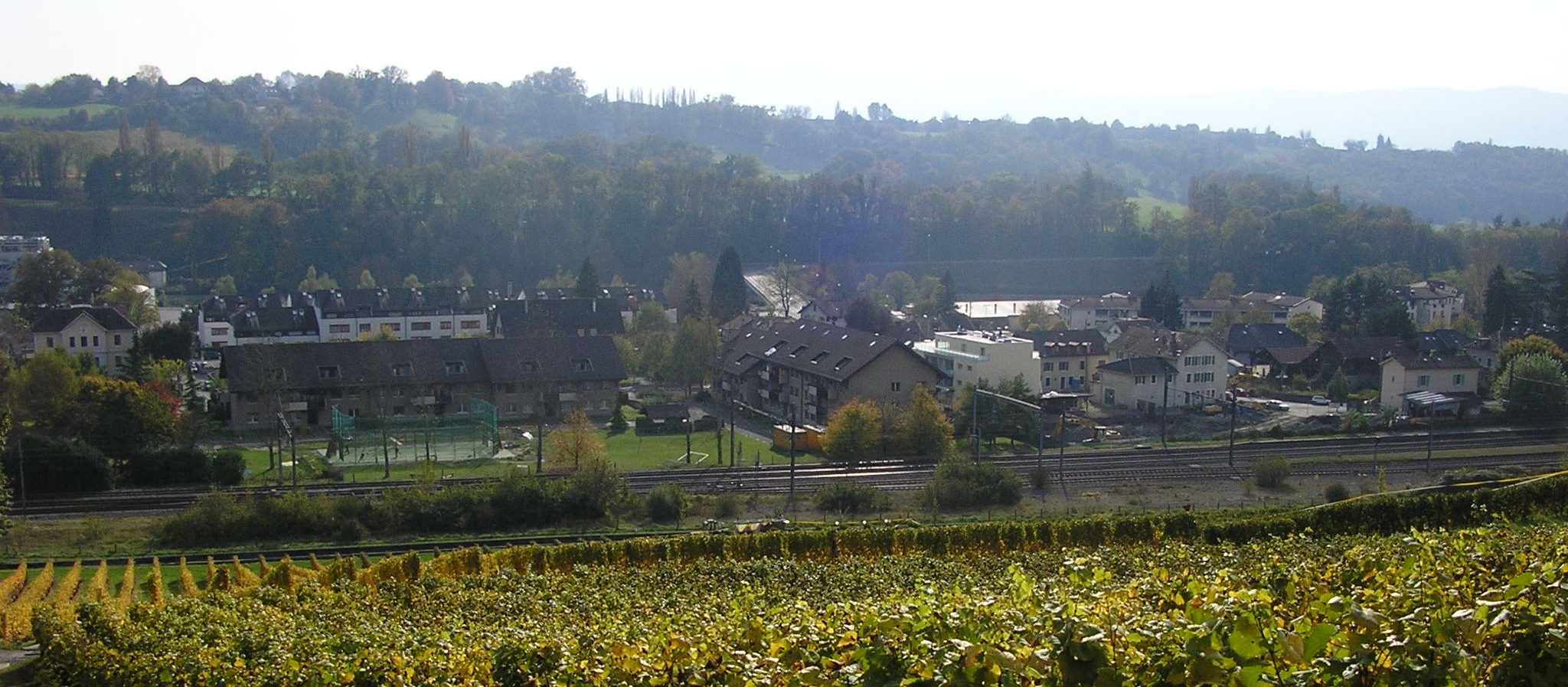

- Flag Coat of arms
- Location of Dardagny
- Location within Switzerland Location within Canton of Geneva
- Coordinates: 46°11′N 06°00′E
- Country: Switzerland
- Canton: Geneva
- District: n.a.

Government
  - Mayor: Maire; Jean-Louis Mory

Area
  - Total: 8.6 km^{2} (3.3 sq mi)
- Elevation: 434 m (1,424 ft)

Population (December 2020)
  - Total: 1,855
  - Density: 220/km^{2} (560/sq mi)
- Time zone: UTC+01:00 (CET)
  - Summer (DST): UTC+02:00 (CEST)
- Postal code: 1283
- SFOS number: 6620
- ISO 3166 code: CH-GE
- Surrounded by: Avully, Challex (FR-01), Péron (FR-01), Russin, Saint-Jean-de-Gonville (FR-01), Satigny, Thoiry (FR-01)
- Website: www.dardagny.ch

Dardagny (French pronunciation: [daʁdaɲi]) is a municipality of the Canton of Geneva, Switzerland.

In 1978, Dardagny received the Wakker Prize for the development and preservation of its architectural heritage.

== History ==
Dardagny was first mentioned in 1309 as Dardaniacum. The village of La Plaine was first mentioned in 1321 as Planum.

== Geography ==
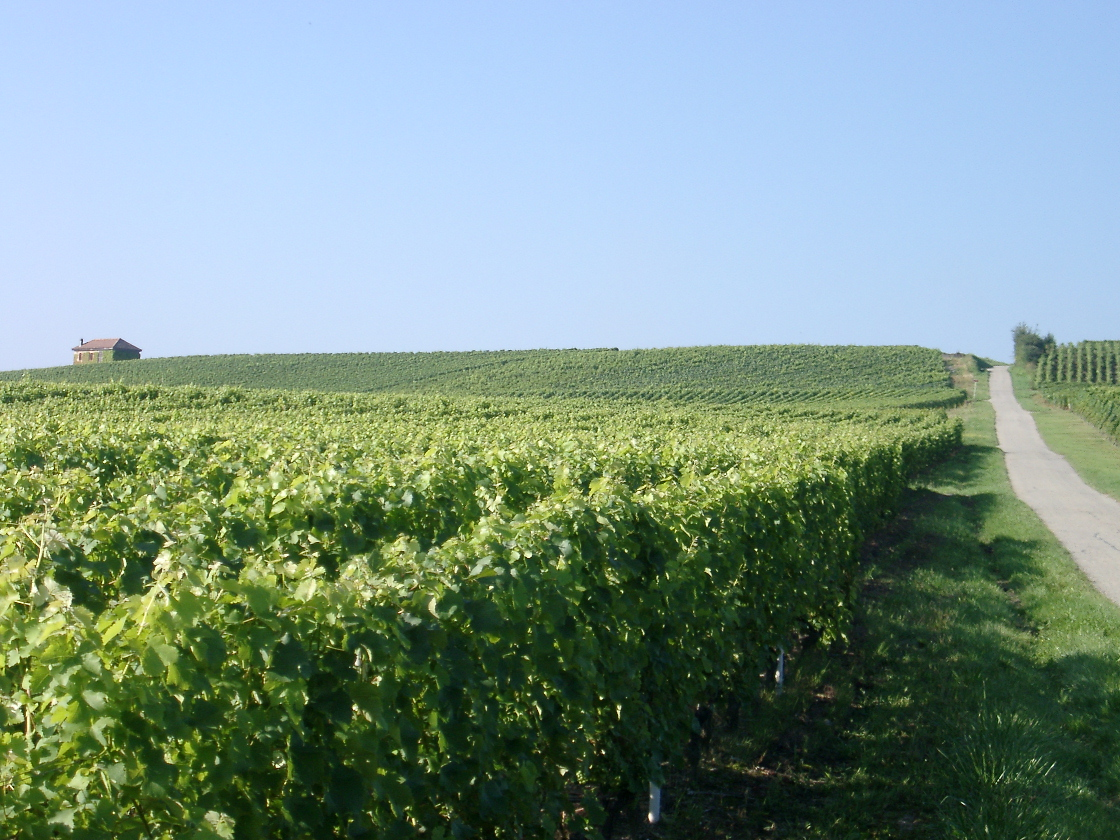
Vineyards near Dardagny

Dardagny has an area, as of 2009, of 8.6 square kilometers (3.3 sq mi). Of this area, 5.27 km^{2} (2.03 sq mi) or 61.3% is used for agricultural purposes, while 2.23 km^{2} (0.86 sq mi) or 25.9% is forested. Of the rest of the land, 0.81 km^{2} (0.31 sq mi) or 9.4% is settled (buildings or roads), 0.2 km^{2} (0.077 sq mi) or 2.3% is either rivers or lakes and 0.08 km^{2} (20 acres) or 0.9% is unproductive land.

Of the built up area, industrial buildings made up 1.2% of the total area while housing and buildings made up 3.7% and transportation infrastructure made up 2.8%. Out of the forested land, 24.5% of the total land area is heavily forested and 1.4% is covered with orchards or small clusters of trees. Of the agricultural land, 32.7% is used for growing crops and 4.7% is pastures, while 24.0% is used for orchards or vine crops. All the water in the municipality is flowing water.

It consists of the villages of Dardagny and La Plaine as well as numerous hamlets including Essertines and Malval.

The municipality of Dardagny consists of the sub-sections or villages of La Tuilière, Roulave, Malval, Essertines, Vallon de l'Allondon, Dardagny and La Plaine.

== Demographics ==
Dardagny has a population (as of December 2020) of 1,855. As of 2008, 26.0% of the population are resident foreign nationals. Over the last 10 years (1999–2009) the population has changed at a rate of 5.4%. It has changed at a rate of -3.9% due to migration and at a rate of 8.6% due to births and deaths.

Most of the population (as of 2000) speaks French (1,088 or 84.7%), with German being second most common (52 or 4.0%) and English being third (44 or 3.4%).

As of 2008, the gender distribution of the population was 49.2% male and 50.8% female. The population was made up of 522 Swiss men (34.3% of the population) and 226 (14.9%) non-Swiss men. There were 575 Swiss women (37.8%) and 197 (13.0%) non-Swiss women. Of the population in the municipality 331 or about 25.8% were born in Dardagny and lived there in 2000. There were 352 or 27.4% who were born in the same canton, while 235 or 18.3% were born somewhere else in Switzerland, and 336 or 26.2% were born outside of Switzerland.

In 2008 there were 7 live births to Swiss citizens and 1 birth to non-Swiss citizens, and in same time span there were 3 deaths of Swiss citizens. Ignoring immigration and emigration, the population of Swiss citizens increased by 4 while the foreign population increased by 1. There were 4 Swiss men and 6 Swiss women who emigrated from Switzerland. At the same time, there were 3 non-Swiss men who immigrated from another country to Switzerland and 3 non-Swiss women who emigrated from Switzerland to another country. The total Swiss population remained the same in 2008 and the non-Swiss population increased by 9 people. This represents a population growth rate of 0.7%.

The age distribution of the population (as of 2000) is children and teenagers (0–19 years old) make up 30.7% of the population, while adults (20–64 years old) make up 62.3% and seniors (over 64 years old) make up 7%.

As of 2000, there were 561 people who were single and never married in the municipality. There were 609 married individuals, 38 widows or widowers and 76 individuals who are divorced.

As of 2000, there were 475 private households in the municipality, and an average of 2.6 persons per household. There were 122 households that consist of only one person and 41 households with five or more people. Out of a total of 492 households that answered this question, 24.8% were households made up of just one person. Of the rest of the households, there are 104 married couples without children, 202 married couples with children There were 45 single parents with a child or children. There were 2 households that were made up of unrelated people and 17 households that were made up of some sort of institution or another collective housing.

In 2000 there were 104 single family homes (or 44.6% of the total) out of a total of 233 inhabited buildings. There were 52 multi-family buildings (22.3%), along with 58 multi-purpose buildings that were mostly used for housing (24.9%) and 19 other use buildings (commercial or industrial) that also had some housing (8.2%). Of the single family homes 39 were built before 1919, while 12 were built between 1990 and 2000.

In 2000 there were 513 apartments in the municipality. The most common apartment size was 3 rooms of which there were 164. There were 26 single room apartments and 140 apartments with five or more rooms. Of these apartments, a total of 462 apartments (90.1% of the total) were permanently occupied, while 44 apartments (8.6%) were seasonally occupied and 7 apartments (1.4%) were empty. As of 2009, the construction rate of new housing units was 11.3 new units per 1000 residents. The vacancy rate for the municipality, in 2010, was 0%.

The historical population is given in the following chart:

== Heritage sites of national significance ==
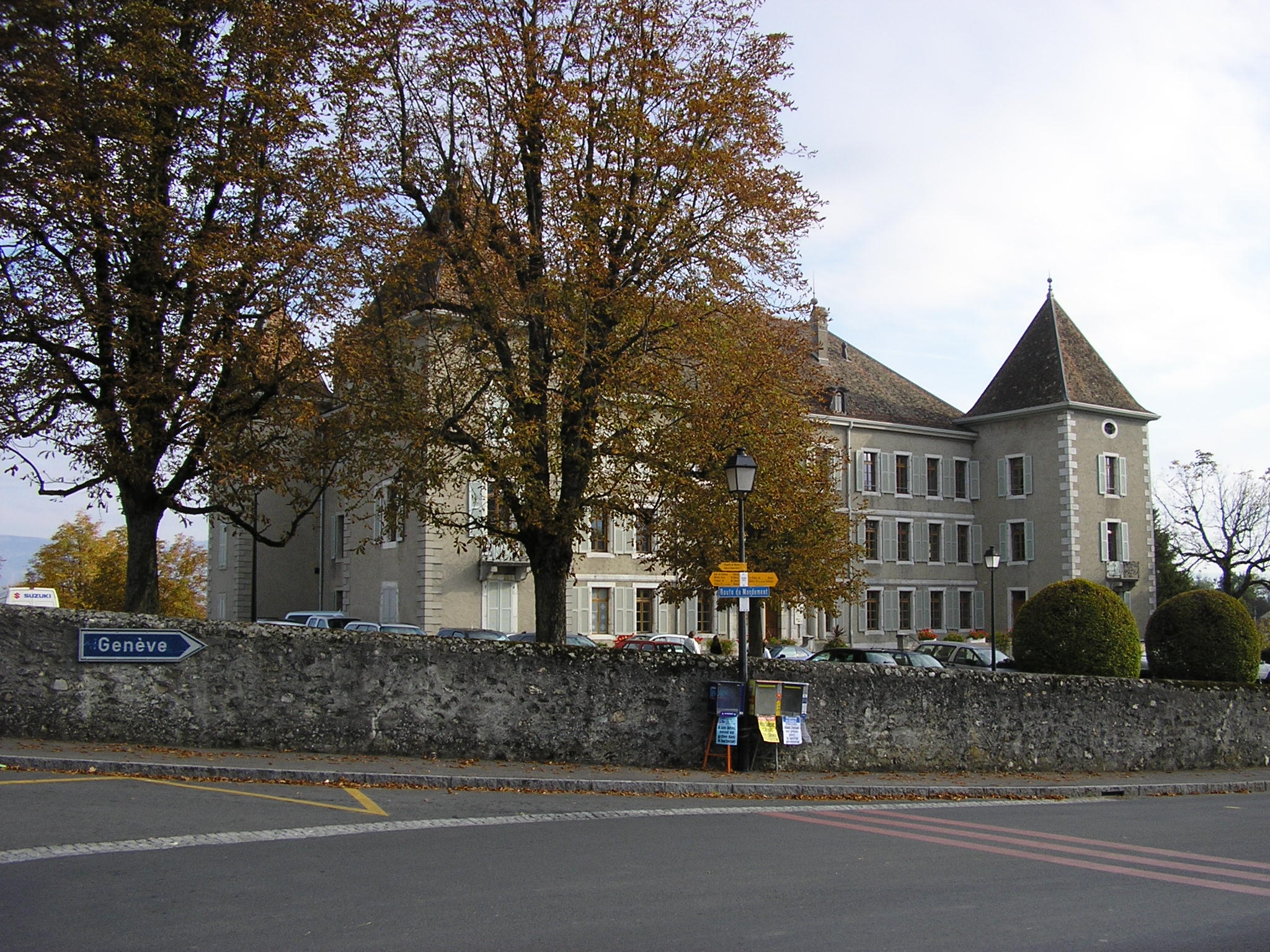
Dardagny Castle

Dardagny Castle and the Farm House Bellevaux are listed as Swiss heritage site of national significance. The entire village of Dardagny and the hamlet of Malval are part of the Inventory of Swiss Heritage Sites.

== Politics ==
In the 2011 federal election the most popular party was the Les Radicaux which received 26.33% of the vote. The next three most popular coalitions were the UDC (16.47%), the SP (15.05%) and the Green parties (14.74%).

In the 2009 Grand Conseil election, there were a total of 719 registered voters of which 288 (40.1%) voted. The most popular party in the municipality for this election was the MCG with 20.0% of the ballots. In the canton-wide election they received the third highest proportion of votes. The second most popular party was the Les Radicaux (with 19.3%), they were sixth in the canton-wide election, while the third most popular party was the Les Verts (with 14.3%), they were second in the canton-wide election.

For the 2009 Conseil d'Etat election, there were a total of 726 registered voters of which 358 (49.3%) voted.

In 2011, all the municipalities held local elections, and in Dardagny there were 13 spots open on the municipal council. There were a total of 986 registered voters of which 484 (49.1%) voted. Out of the 484 votes, there were 5 blank votes, 5 null or unreadable votes and 212 votes with a name that was not on the list.

== Economy ==
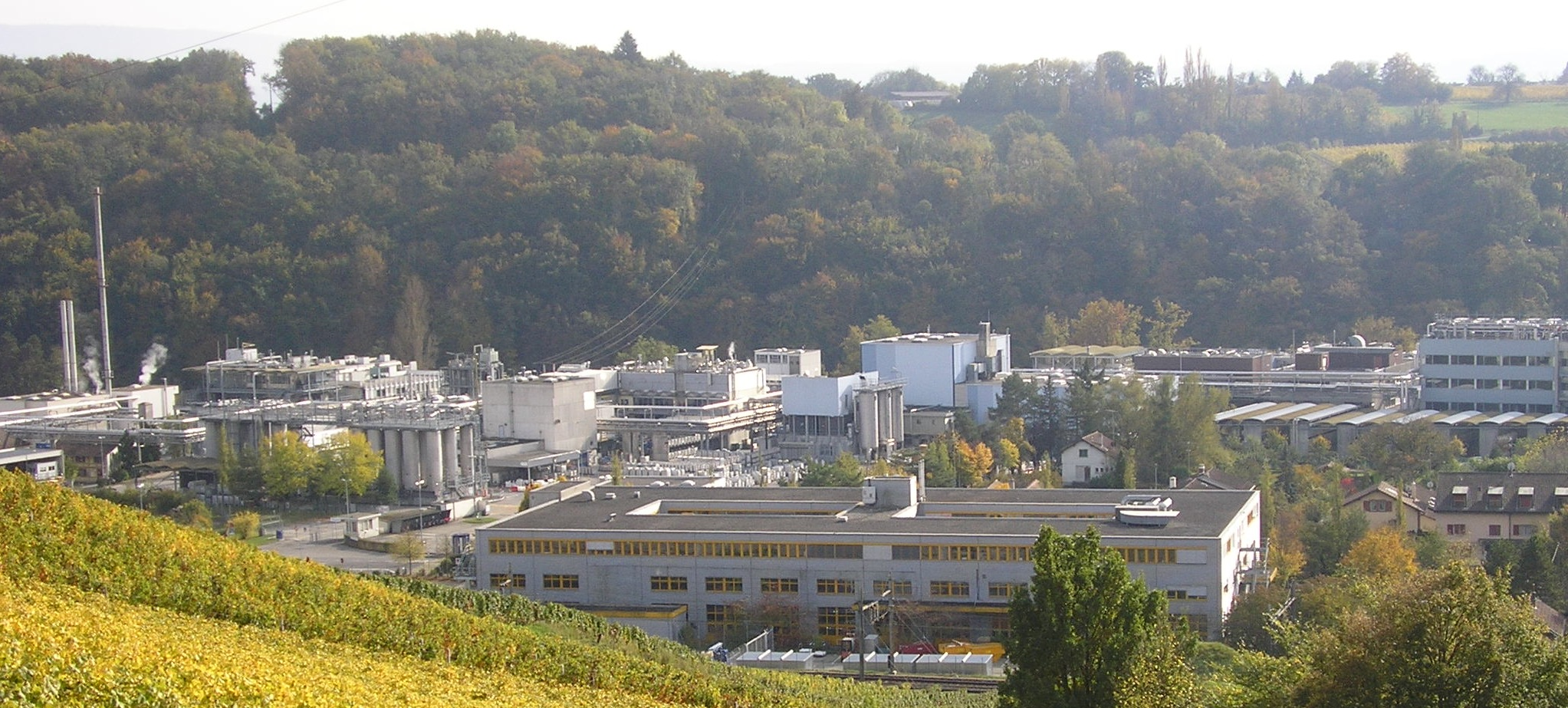
Firmenich plant in La Plaine

As of 2010, Dardagny had an unemployment rate of 3.9%. As of 2008, there were 95 people employed in the primary economic sector and about 26 businesses involved in this sector. 411 people were employed in the secondary sector and there were 9 businesses in this sector. 71 people were employed in the tertiary sector, with 23 businesses in this sector. There were 656 residents of the municipality who were employed in some capacity, of which females made up 42.1% of the workforce.

In 2008 the total number of full-time equivalent jobs was 541. The number of jobs in the primary sector was 73, all of which were in agriculture. The number of jobs in the secondary sector was 406 of which 399 or (98.3%) were in manufacturing and 7 (1.7%) were in construction. The number of jobs in the tertiary sector was 62. In the tertiary sector; 6 or 9.7% were in wholesale or retail sales or the repair of motor vehicles, 3 or 4.8% were in the movement and storage of goods, 19 or 30.6% were in a hotel or restaurant, 2 or 3.2% were in the information industry, 7 or 11.3% were in education and 2 or 3.2% were in health care.

In 2000, there were 435 workers who commuted into the municipality and 496 workers who commuted away. The municipality is a net exporter of workers, with about 1.1 workers leaving the municipality for every one entering. About 20.2% of the workforce coming into Dardagny are coming from outside Switzerland, while 0.0% of the locals commute out of Switzerland for work. Of the working population, 21.3% used public transportation to get to work, and 57% used a private car.

== Religion ==
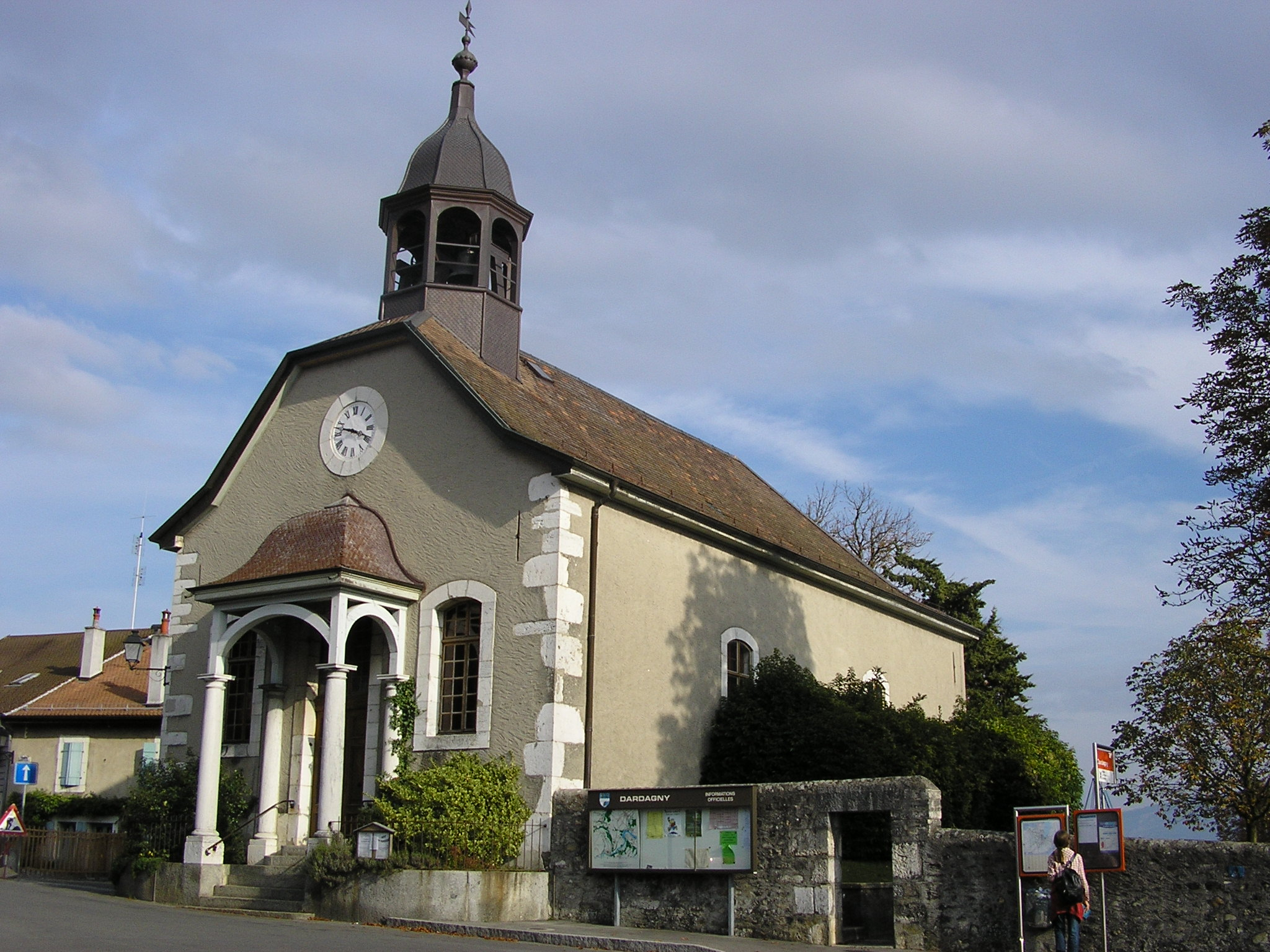
Church in Dardagny

From the 2000 census, 475 or 37.0% were Roman Catholic, while 359 or 28.0% belonged to the Swiss Reformed Church. Of the rest of the population, there were 12 members of an Orthodox church (or about 0.93% of the population), there was 1 individual who belongs to the Christian Catholic Church, and there were 29 individuals (or about 2.26% of the population) who belonged to another Christian church. There were 2 individuals (or about 0.16% of the population) who were Jewish, and 16 (or about 1.25% of the population) who were Islamic. There were 2 individuals who were Buddhist, 1 person who was Hindu and 1 individual who belonged to another church. 306 (or about 23.83% of the population) belonged to no church, are agnostic or atheist, and 80 individuals (or about 6.23% of the population) did not answer the question.

== Education ==
In Dardagny about 421 or (32.8%) of the population have completed non-mandatory upper secondary education, and 208 or (16.2%) have completed additional higher education (either university or a Fachhochschule). Of the 208 who completed tertiary schooling, 35.1% were Swiss men, 34.1% were Swiss women, 17.8% were non-Swiss men and 13.0% were non-Swiss women.

During the 2009-2010 school year there were a total of 324 students in the Dardagny school system. The education system in the Canton of Geneva allows young children to attend two years of non-obligatory Kindergarten. During that school year, there were 22 children who were in a pre-kindergarten class. The canton's school system provides two years of non-mandatory kindergarten and requires students to attend six years of primary school, with some of the children attending smaller, specialized classes. In Dardagny there were 53 students in kindergarten or primary school and 3 students were in the special, smaller classes. The secondary school program consists of three lower, obligatory years of schooling, followed by three to five years of optional, advanced schools. There were 53 lower secondary students who attended school in Dardagny. There were 94 upper secondary students from the municipality along with 15 students who were in a professional, non-university track program. An additional 23 students attended a private school.

As of 2000, there were 24 students in Dardagny who came from another municipality, while 141 residents attended schools outside the municipality.

== Transportation ==
The municipality has a railway station, La Plaine, on the Lyon–Geneva line. It has regular service to Geneva.
