= String Quartet (Verdi) =

Composition for string quartet by Giuseppe Verdi

- by Giuseppe Verdi
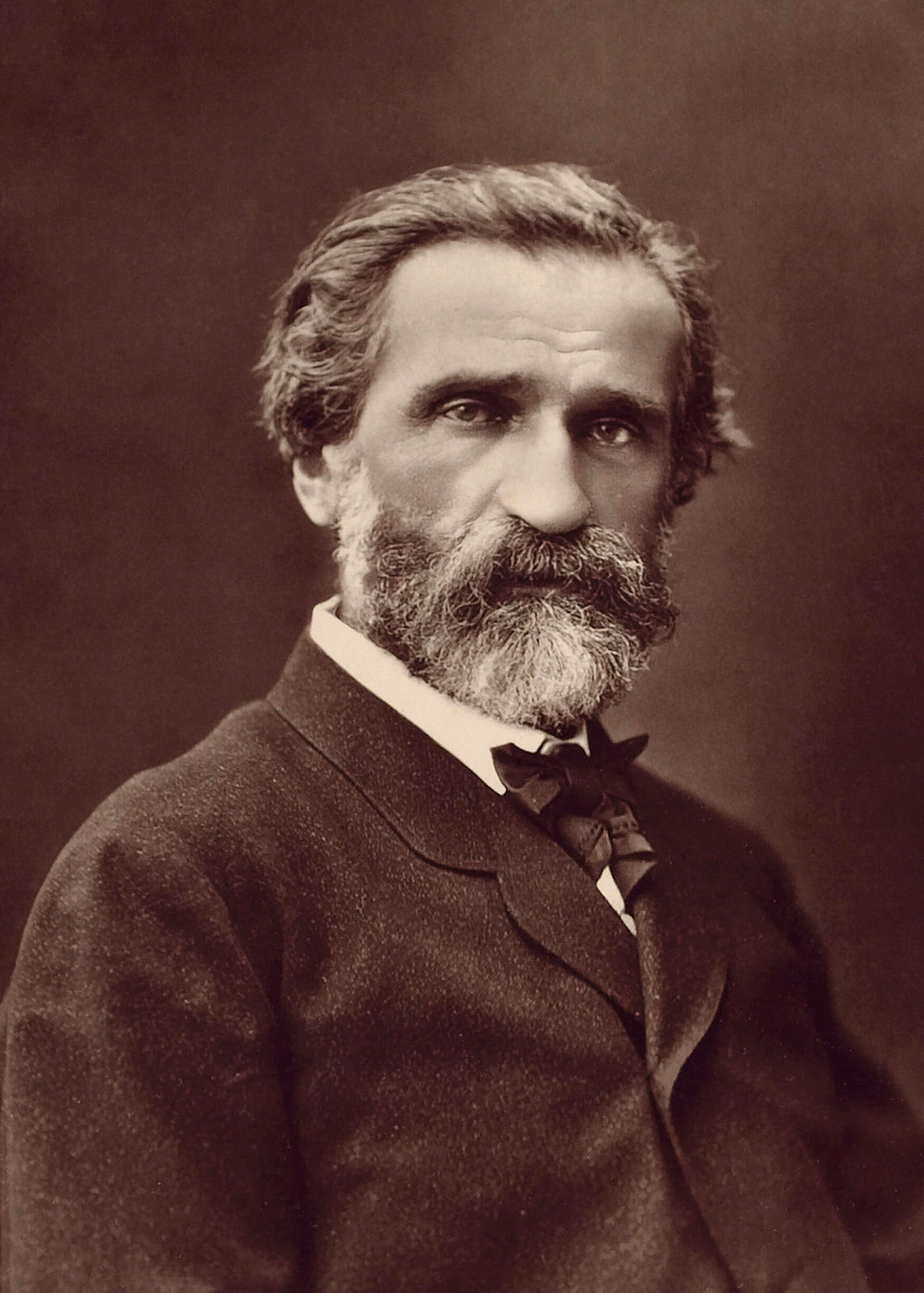
- Portrait of Verdi by Ferdinand Mulnier
- Native name: Quartetto in mi minore
- Key: E minor
- Genre: Classical music
- Form: String Quartet
- Composed: 1873–1873: Naples
- Performed: 1 April 1873: Naples
- Published: 1873: Milan: Ricordi
- Movements: 4 movements: 1. Allegro; 2. Andantino; 3. Prestissimo; 4. Scherzo Fuga. Allegro assai mosso
- Scoring: 2 violins, viola, cello

Giuseppe Verdi's String Quartet in E minor was written in the spring of 1873 during a production of Aida in Naples. It is the only surviving chamber music work in Verdi's catalogue.

== History ==
Verdi's production of Aida in early March, 1873 was delayed due to the sudden illness of soprano Teresa Stolz. Verdi focused his time in Naples on the writing of his first chamber work, the String Quartet in E minor. The work was premiered two days after the opening of Aida during an informal recital at his hotel on April 1, 1873. The names of the original performers survive only as Pinto brothers, violins, Salvadore, viola, and Giarritiello, cello.

Verdi commented on the work, saying "I've written a Quartet in my leisure moments in Naples. I had it performed one evening in my house, without attaching the least importance to it and without inviting anyone in particular. Only the seven or eight persons who usually come to visit me were present. I don't know whether the Quartet is beautiful or ugly, but I do know that it's a Quartet!"

The quartet also exists in a version for string orchestra by Arturo Toscanini.

== Structure ==
The Quartet is scored for the usual string quartet complement of two violins, viola, and cello. There are four movements:

1. Allegro
2. Andantino
3. Prestissimo
4. Scherzo Fuga. Allegro assai mosso
