= Ricardo Villa (composer) =

Spanish composer (1873–1935)

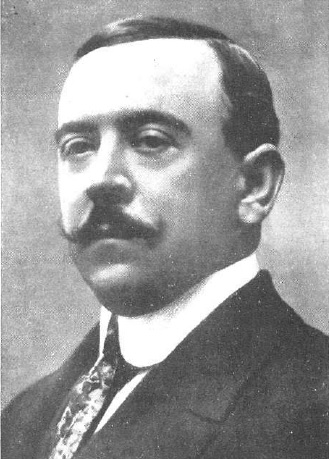
Ricardo Villa

Ricardo Villa (October 23, 1873 Madrid – April 10, 1935 Madrid) was a Spanish composer. Among his compositions are two zarzuela, El Cristo de la Vega and Raimundo Lulio.
