= Eben E. Rexford =

American poet

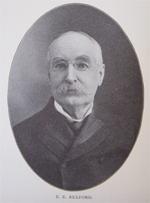
- Portrait of Rexford from J. H. Hall
- Born: Eben Eugene Rexford; July 16, 1848; Johnsburg, New York, U.S.
- Died: October 18, 1916 (aged 68); Green Bay, Wisconsin, U.S.
- Resting place: Bovina Cemetery
- Education: Lawrence University
- Occupations: Writer; poet

Eben Eugene Rexford (July 16, 1848 – October 18, 1916) was an American writer and poet, and author of lyrics to popular and gospel songs.

== Biography ==
Eben E. Rexford was born in Johnsburg, New York on July 16, 1848. He moved with his family to Ellington, Wisconsin in 1855. His first poems were published in the New York Ledger when Rexford was 14. Among the many songs he wrote, Rexford is best remembered for the lyrics to "Silver Threads Among the Gold", which were set to music by Hart Pease Danks. This song was one of the first items to be recorded mechanically. Another poem that has had continuing popularity is "The Ride of Paul Venarez", which is considered to be a "cowboy poem", even though the author was from Wisconsin. It has been turned into a song, "Billy Venero", and has a colorful history.

Rexford was a prolific writer. Most of his books were about gardening. In addition, he wrote many poems and stories. He worked with the Ladies' Home Journal for 14 years. After leaving that magazine, he wrote for American Homes and Gardens, House and Gardens, and American Home Monthly. His articles also appeared frequently in Lippincott's and Outing. Rexford's fiction was published stories by Beadle and Adams and other periodical publishers. He was a member of the Chicago Press Club and the Authors Club of Boston. For more than 20 years he served as organist at the Congregational Church of Shiocton, Wisconsin. Following many years as Town Clerk at Bovina, he died in Green Bay and was buried at Bovina Cemetery.

Eben E. Rexford received an honorary doctorate from his alma mater, Lawrence University, in 1908, and he was inducted into the Songwriters Hall of Fame in 1970.

== Partial bibliography ==
=== Books ===
- 1881. Flowers in Winter. Chicago, E. H. Libby.
- 1882. The Flower Garden. Chicago, E. H. Libby (reprinted Boston, Bradley fertilizer Co, 1896).
- 1887. Brother and Lover: a Woman's Story. (a book of poems.) New York, J. B. Alden.
- 1887 (c. 1886) Grandmother's Garden. (a book of poems.) Chicago: A. C. McClurg & Co.
- 1890. Home Floriculture; a Familiar Guide to the Treatment of Flowering and Other Ornamental Plants in the House and Garden. Rochester, J. Vick, 1890. (An 1890 and later editions published by Orange Judd Publishing Company also exist. The Library of Congress also has a 1903 edition.)
- 1894. The Practical Guide to Floriculture. New York, F. M. Lupton.
- 1896. Our Winter Flowers. [Philadelphia?]
- 1898. Flowers, How to Grow Them. Philadelphia : Penn Pub. Co.
- 1899. The American Pure Food Cook Book and Household Economist (co-authors: David Chidlow, Mrs. Myra Russell Garrett, and Ella Shuart). Chicago: Geo. M. Hill Company.
- 1900. Into the Light: The Story of a Boy's Influence, and India: The Story of a Famine. (with Helen Frances Huntington). Mennonite Publishing Co. (not in Library of Congress catalog. Available from antiquarian book sellers.)
- 1907. Four Seasons in the Garden (with twenty-seven illustrations and with decorations by Edward Stratton Holloway). Philadelphia, London, J. B. Lippincott Company.
- 1909. The Home Garden; a Book on Vegetable and Small-fruit Growing, for the use of the amateur gardener. Philadelphia & London, J. B. Lippincott Company.
- 1910. Indoor Gardening. Philadelphia & London, J. B. Lippincott Company.
- 1910. Pansies and Rosemary. (a book of poems.) Philadelphia & London, J. B. Lippincott Company.
- 1912. Amateur Garden Craft: A Book for the Home-maker and Garden Lover. Philadelphia: J. B. Lippincott.
- 1915. A-B-C of Gardening. New York, London, Harper & Brothers.
- 1916. A-B-C of Vegetable Gardening. New York: Harper & Brothers.
- 1916. The Making of a Home. (with illustrations from photographs of actual homes and gardens.) Philadelphia, G. W. Jacobs & Company.
- 1918. The Home Garden; a Book on Vegetable and Small-fruit Growing, for the Use of the Amateur Gardener. Philadelphia & London, J. B. Lippincott Company.

=== Nonfiction articles and pamphlets ===
- 1892. "Arranging Flowers" (with Frances Anna Gaylord), Pub. J. F. Ingalls, 4pp.
- 1892. "Plant Lice and Fumigation". Scientific American, November 19, 1892, p. 326.
- 1889–1890. Regular columns in the Ladies' Home Journal titled "Talks About Flowers", "Floral Department", and "All About Flowers".
- 1901. "Our Village Improvement Society". Lippincott's, Vol. 67, April 1901, pp. 480–4.
- 1902. "Back-yard Gardens and Window-Boxes". Lippincott's, Vol. 69, March 1902, pp. 363–7.
- 1903. "Rural Village Improvement Societies". Lippincott's, Vol. 71, March 1903, pp. 383–8.
- 1909. "Begonia." American Homes, Vol. 6, Jun. 1909, pp. 226–227.

=== Stories and poems ===
- 1873. "Down in the Meadows", a poem. The Galaxy, Vol. 15, No. 6, June 1873, p. 828. (This poem is available at the Cornell University website.)
- 1873. "A Year and a Day", a poem. The Galaxy, Vol. 15, No. 6, September 1873, pp. 323–4. (This poem is available at the Cornell University website.)
- 1875. "Blind", in Girls of Today, Volume I, No. 1. December 4, 1875.
- 1876. "Miss Professor Jones", in Girls of Today, Volume 1, No. 7. January 15, 1876.
- 1876. "The Romance of a Rose", in Girls of Today, Volume 1, No. 8. January 22, 1876.
- 1876. "The Price of a Woman's Soul", in Girls of Today, Volume 1, No. 9. January 29, 1876.
- 1876. "How Bob Got Even", in Girls of Today, Volume 1, No. 10. February 5, 1876.
- 1876. "Long Ago", in Girls of Today, Volume 1, No. 21. April 22, 1876.
- 1876. "My Affinity", in Girls of Today, Volume 1, No. 23. May 6, 1876.
- 1881. "The Ride of Paul Venarez", a poem in Youth's Companion, December 29, 1881. (There is a long and colorful history related to this poem.)
- 1882. "Baby", a poem in Frank Leslie's Popular Monthly Magazine.
- 1888. "John Fielding and His Enemy".
- 1888. "The Woman He Loved" in Frank Leslie's Popular Monthly Magazine.
- 1889. "One of Bobby's Troubles", a poem, in Ladies' Home Journal, Vol. 6, No. 10, September 1889.
- 1889. "Carol for Christmas", in Ladies' Home Journal, Vol. 7, No. 1, December 1889.
- 1890. "The Vision", a poem, in Ladies' Home Journal, Vol. 7, No. 3, February 1890.
- 1890. "There's No Time Like the Present", a poem, in Ladies' Home Journal, Vol. 7, No. 4, March 1890.
- 1892. "One of a Thousand: A Serial Story", in New England Magazine, various issues. (This story is available at the Cornell University website.)
- 1893–94. contributions to Demorest's Family Magazine, Vol. 30. November 1893 – October 1894.
- 1895. "A-wheel", poem. Critic, October 12, 1895, p. 225.
- 1901. "Old Garden", poem. Current Literature, Vol 30. June 1901, p. 720.
- 1901. "Happy Isles", poem. Lippincott's, Vol 68. September 1901, p. 381.
- 1903. "Sunset Fancy", poem. Cosmopolitan, Vol 35. October 1903, p. 634.
- 1907. "A Trip Up Ashland Way", in Outer's Book, (Milwaukee, WI) Vol. 14, No. 3, September 1907, pp. 1039–1048.
- 1913. "Tell Somebody", in Boy's Own Paper, August 16, 1913.
- 1917. "A Sunset Fancy", a poem republished in New York Times, July 15, 1917, p. 61.
- Date unknown. First line: "Last night I heard a robin singing in the rain."

=== Songs ===
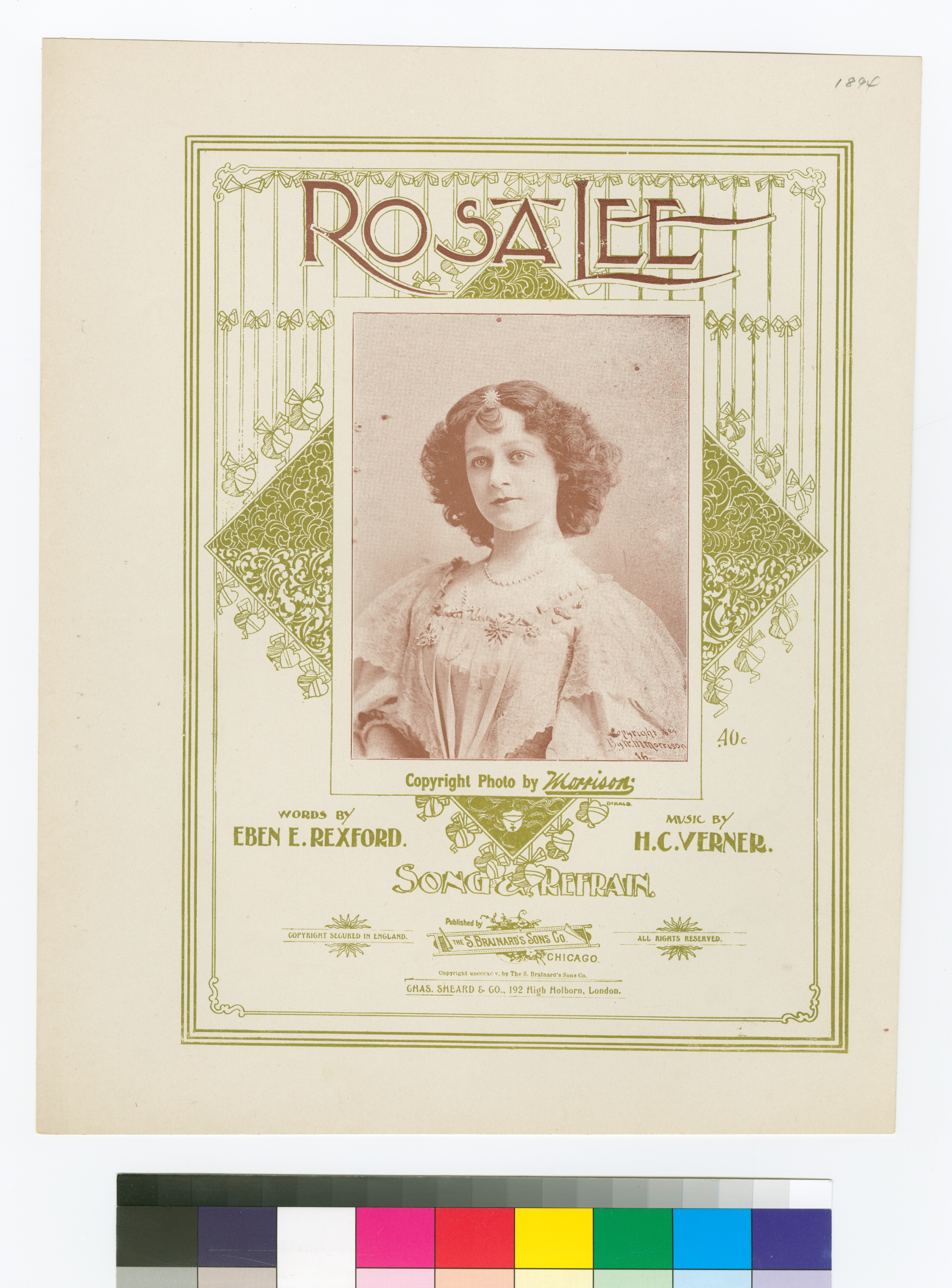
Rosa Lee

- 1872. "Silver Threads Among the Gold". (music by H. P. Danks.) Sheet music: New York: Charles W. Harris, 1873.
- 1880. "Grandmother's Waiting". (music by W. Irving Hartshorne). Cincinnati: John Church & Co. (The text for this song is available online)
- 1881. "Mother Rests Beneath the Daisies". (music by A. S. Dewitt). Sheet music: W. A. Evans and Brothers.
- 1865. "My Beau that Went to Canada" (music by G. Wurzel [alias for George Frederick Root, 1820-1895]). Chicago: Root and Cady. (The text for this patriotic song is available online.)
- 1890. "Rosa Lee". (music by H. C. Verner). Sheet music: Chicago: S. Brainard's Sons, 1890.
- 1902. "Little Sunbeams". (music by Charles H. Gabriel) in Excell, E. O., Ed. Inspiring Hymns. Chicago, E. O. Excell, Pub., 1914, no. 153.
- 1904. "O Where Are the Reapers?" (music by George F. Root) in Excell, E. O., Ed. Inspiring Hymns. Chicago, E. O. Excell, Pub., 1914, no. 102.
- 1905. "Praise Ye the Lord". (music by Arthur S. Sullivan) in Praises. Chicago: E. O. Excell Pub. No. 28. (This is a Google book.)
- 1905. "All Will Come Right". \ (music by C. Austin Miles) in Hall, J. Lincoln, et al., Eds. New Songs of the Gospel, Numbers 1, 2, and 3 Combined, Philadelphia: Hall-Mack Co., 1909, no. 116.
- 1905. "In the Shadow of His Wings". (music by C. Austin Miles) in Hall, J. Lincoln, et al., Eds. New Songs of the Gospel, Numbers 1, 2, and 3 Combined, Philadelphia: Hall-Mack Co., 1909, no. 123.
- 1909. "Crown Him King of Kings". (music by DeLoss Smith) in Rodeheaver, Homer and B. D. Ackley, Eds. Great Revival Hymns, Chicago: Rodeheaver-Ackley Co., 1911, no. 176.
- 1909. "A Sinner Saved by Grace". (music by C. Austin Miles) in Hall, J. Lincoln, et al., Eds. New Songs of the Gospel, Numbers 1, 2, and 3 Combined, Philadelphia: Hall-Mack Co., 1909, no. 90.
- 1910. "How You Will Love Him". (music by B. D. Ackley) in Rodeheaver, Homer and B. D. Ackley, Eds. Great Revival Hymns, Chicago: Rodeheaver-Ackley Co., 1911, no. 32.
- Date unknown. "Mighty to Deliver" in Eternal Praise. Chicago: Hope Publishing Co., 1917.
- Date unknown. "I Am Redeemed" in Eternal Praise. Chicago: Hope Publishing Co., 1917.
- Date unknown. "Reapers for the Harvest" in Eternal Praise. Chicago: Hope Publishing Co., 1917.
- Date unknown. "A Thousand Years of Prohibition" in Eternal Praise. Chicago: Hope Publishing Co., 1917.
- Date unknown. "Go Away Alone With Jesus" in Heavenly Voices. James D. Vaughan Music Pub., 1918.
- Date unknown. "Come Unto Me and Rest" in Heavenly Voices. James D. Vaughan Music Pub., 1918. (Note: There are at least two other "Come Unto Me" songs, one by Charles P. Jones, and the other by Eliza E. Hewitt, in Benson, John T., Ed., Spiritual Power, 1951.)
- Date unknown. "When the Call Comes" in Heavenly Voices. James D. Vaughan Music Pub., 1918.
- Date unknown. "By and By". (Note: There are at least two other songs by this name. One by Fanny J. Crosby in 1898. – Black, J. M., Ed. The Chorus of Praise. NY:Eaton and Mains, 1898. no. 40. The other by Maud Frazer and Mary Bernstecher in 1908 – Alexander, Charles M. Alexander's Gospel Songs. Philadelphia: Westminster Press, 1908, no. 11.)
- Date unknown. "Do Some Good Deed Every Day".
