= Hart Pease Danks =

American songwriter

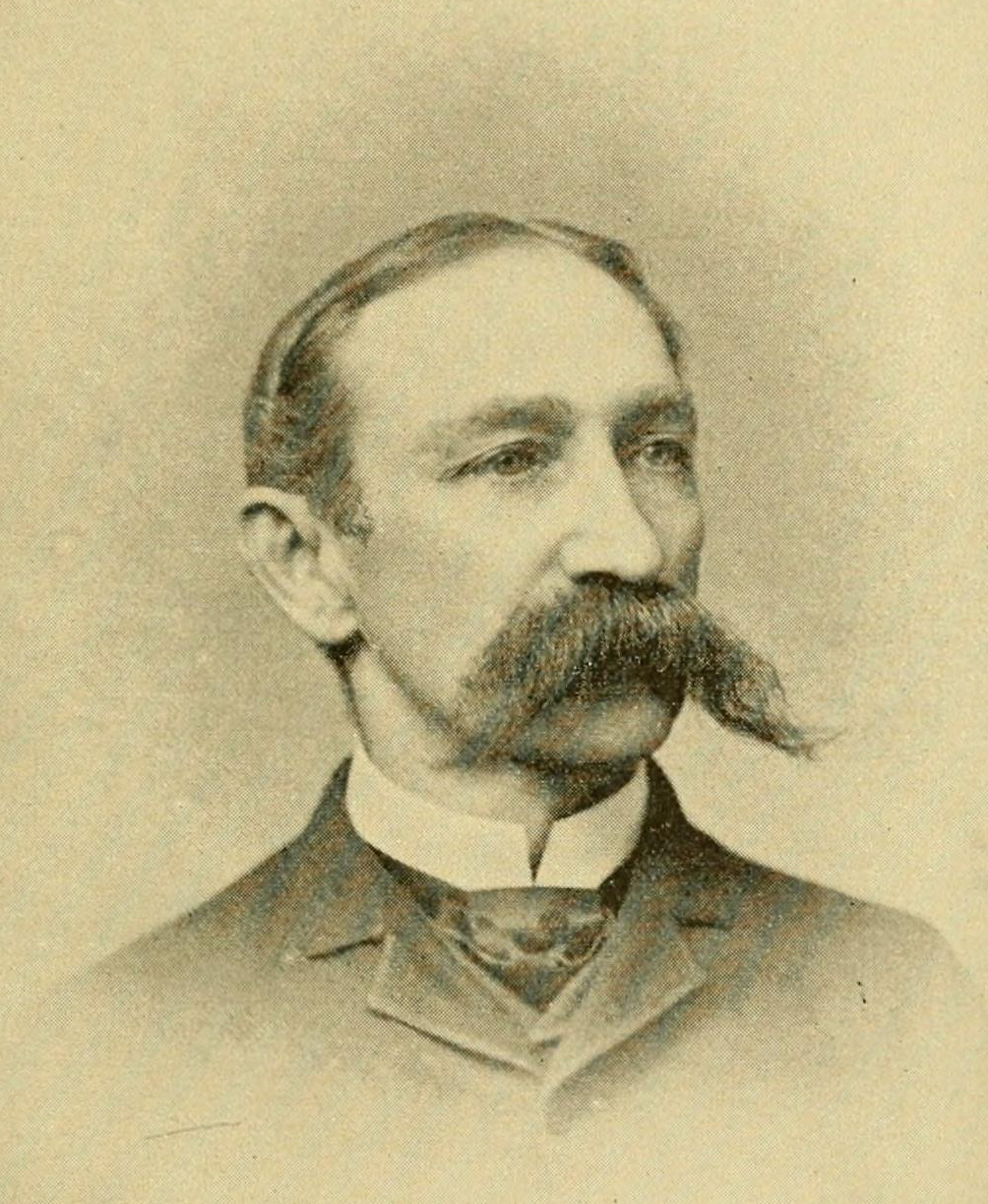

Background information
- Born: April 6, 1834; New Haven, Connecticut
- Died: November 20, 1903 (aged 69) Philadelphia, Pennsylvania
- Occupation: Songwriter
- Years active: 1850s-1890s

Hart Pease Danks (6 April 1834 – 20 November 1903) was an American musician who specialized in composing, singing and leading choral groups. He is best known for his 1873 composition, "Silver Threads Among the Gold" and "Who Will Buy My Pretty Flowers"".

== Biography ==
Born in New Haven, Connecticut, Danks moved with his family to Saratoga Springs, New York when he was eight. He studied music with Dr. E. Whiting, later moving to Chicago, where he worked as a carpenter in his father's construction business before embarking on a full-time music career.

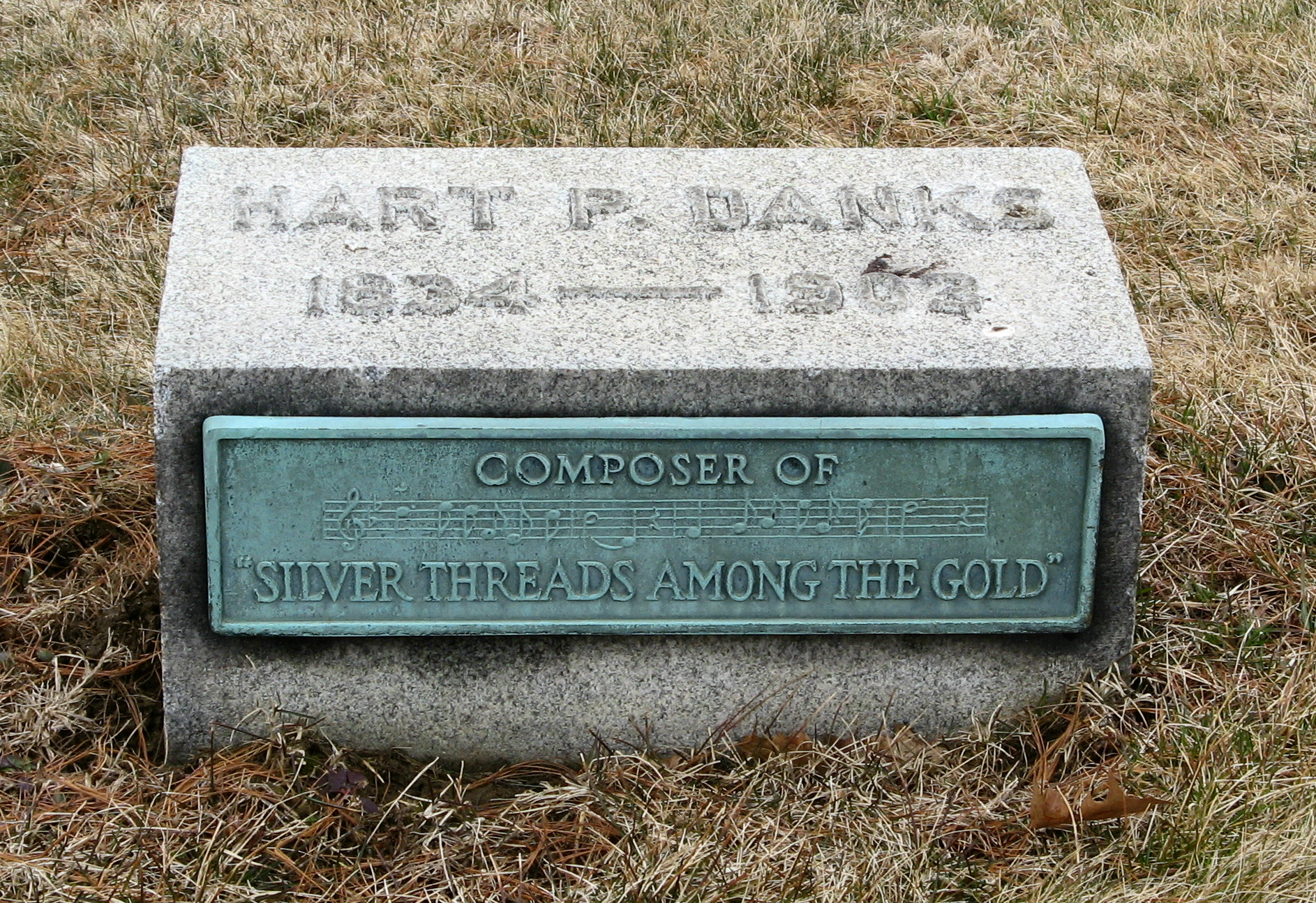
Gravestone of H.P. Danks, Kensico Cemetery, in Valhalla, New York

In 1858, he married Hattie R. Colahan. In 1864, he moved to New York City. In 1873, he published his best known song, "Silver Threads Among the Gold" (words by Eben E. Rexford), which sold over three million copies. Having sold the rights to it, though, he died penniless in a boarding house in Philadelphia, his last written words: "It's hard to die alone". His widow died, alone, in 1924. Danks is buried at Kensico Cemetery, in Valhalla, New York.

Pease Danks was inducted into the Songwriters Hall of Fame in 1970. He wrote over 1,000 songs.

His works also include several operettas, including Zanie (published 1887, to a libretto by Fanny Crosby) and Pauline, or the Belle of Saratoga (ca.1874).

== Other collaborators and contributions. ==
- Other lyricists who Danks worked with included Samuel N. Mitchell and Fanny Crosby.
- In 1892, he published Superior Anthems for Church Choirs, and himself wrote numerous church hymns.
- He wrote the music and Jenny Calef wrote the lyrics for "Won't You Buy My Pretty Flowers" in 1887.
