= Dylan Thomas (disambiguation) =

Dylan Thomas (1914–1953) was a Welsh poet.

Dylan Thomas may also refer to:

- Dylan Thomas (Australian musician) (born 1988), Australian musician
- Dylan Thomas (horse) (born 2003), Irish retired Thoroughbred racehorse and active sire
- Dylan Thomas (field hockey) (born 1996), New Zealand field hockey player
- Dylan Thomas (film), a 1962 short film
- Jon Schillaci (born 1971), former US fugitive who used the alias Dylan Thomas

== See also ==
- Dillon Thomas (born 1992), American MLB player
- Dylan Thomas Boathouse, a boathouse in Laugharne, Wales
- Dylan Thomas Cerulli, real name of Pyrex (rapper) (born 1994), Italian rapper
- Dylan Thomas Centre, an arts centre in Swansea, Wales
- Dylan Thomas More, American past member of industrial rock band Chemlab
- Dylan Thomas Prize, a literary prize
- Dylan Thomas Screenplay Award, an annual prize
- Dylan Thomas-Smith (born 2004), English actor
- Dylan Thomas Sprouse (born 1992), American actor
- Dylan Thomas Theatre, a theatre in Swansea, Wales
- Dylan Thomas Trail, a trail in west Wales
