= And death shall have no dominion =

1933 poem by Dylan Thomas

"And death shall have no dominion" is a poem written by Welsh poet Dylan Thomas (1914–1953). The title comes from St. Paul's epistle to the Romans (6:9): "Christ being raised from the dead dieth no more; death hath no dominion over him." The poem portrays death as a guarantee of immortality, drawing on imagery from John Donne's Devotions Upon Emergent Occasions.

== Poem ==
And death shall have no dominion.
Dead men naked they shall be one
With the man in the wind and the west moon;
When their bones are picked clean and the clean bones gone,
They shall have stars at elbow and foot;
Though they go mad they shall be sane,
Though they sink through the sea they shall rise again;
Though lovers be lost love shall not;
And death shall have no dominion.

And death shall have no dominion.
Under the windings of the sea
They lying long shall not die windily;
Twisting on racks when sinews give way,
Strapped to a wheel, yet they shall not break;
Faith in their hands shall snap in two,
And the unicorn evils run them through;
Split all ends up they shan't crack;
And death shall have no dominion.

And death shall have no dominion.
No more may gulls cry at their ears
Or waves break loud on the seashores;
Where blew a flower may a flower no more
Lift its head to the blows of the rain;
Though they be mad and dead as nails,
Heads of the characters hammer through daisies;
Break in the sun till the sun breaks down,
And death shall have no dominion.

== Publication history ==
In early 1933, Thomas befriended Bert Trick, a grocer who worked in the Uplands area of Swansea. Trick was an amateur poet who had several poems published in local papers. In spring 1933, Trick suggested the two men both write a poem on the subject of 'immortality'. Trick's poem, which was published in a newspaper the following year, contained the refrain "For death is not the end." In 1933, in a notebook marked 'April', Thomas wrote the poem "And death shall have no dominion". Trick persuaded him to seek a publisher and in May of that year it was printed in New English Weekly.

On 10 September 1936, two years after the release of his first volume of poetry (18 Poems), Twenty-five Poems was published. It revealed Thomas's personal beliefs pertaining to religion and the forces of nature, and included "And death shall have no dominion".

== Cultural references ==
The poem was set to music by Paul Kelly in his album Nature (2018). The titles of the novels They Shall Have Stars (1956) by James Blish and No Dominion (2006) by Charlie Huston are both taken from the poem. Mithu Sanyal quotes the poem at length in her novel Identitti (2022). Disc 2 of UNKLE Sounds' release Edit Music For A Film (2005) features the first verse of the poem, played over an UNKLE Sounds edit of Next Life/Is That What Everybody Wants. It is featured prominently in the film Solaris. The poem is referenced in the title of the song "Death Shall Have No Dominion" by Imminence.

== Bibliography ==
- Ferris, Paul (1989). Dylan Thomas, A Biography. New York: Paragon House. ISBN 1-55778-215-6.
