= Dylan Thomas =

Welsh poet and writer (1914–1953)

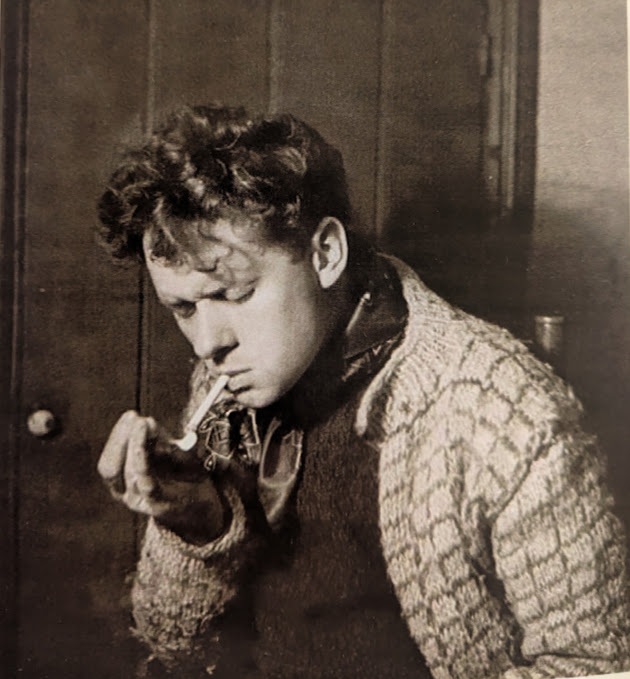
- Thomas in 1937
- Born: Dylan Marlais Thomas; 27 October 1914; Swansea, Wales
- Died: 9 November 1953 (aged 39); New York City, US
- Resting place: Laugharne, Wales
- Occupations: Poet; writer
- Spouse: Caitlin Macnamara (m. 1937)
- Children: 3, including Aeronwy
- Relatives: Gordon Thomas (cousin)

Dylan Marlais Thomas (27 October 1914 – 9 November 1953) was a Welsh poet and writer, whose works include the poems "Do not go gentle into that good night" and "And death shall have no dominion", as well as the "play for voices" Under Milk Wood. He also wrote stories and radio broadcasts such as A Child's Christmas in Wales and Portrait of the Artist as a Young Dog. He became widely popular in his lifetime, and remained so after his death at the age of 39 in New York City. By then, he had acquired a reputation, which he had encouraged, as a "roistering, drunken and doomed poet".

Dylan Thomas was born in Swansea in 1914, leaving school in 1932 to become a reporter for the South Wales Daily Post. A number of the some 200 poems he produced between 1931 and 1935 appeared in print while he was still a teenager, including one of his best known, And Death Shall Have No Dominion, the first he had published, in May 1933, in a national journal. While living in London, Thomas met Caitlin Macnamara; they married in 1937 and had three children: Llewelyn, Aeronwy, and Colm.

He came to be appreciated as a popular poet during his lifetime, though he found earning a living as a writer difficult. He began augmenting his income with reading tours and radio broadcasts. His radio recordings for the BBC during the late 1940s brought him to a wider public's attention, and he was frequently featured by the BBC as an accessible voice of the literary scene. Thomas first travelled to the United States in the 1950s; his readings there brought him a degree of fame, while his erratic behaviour and drinking worsened. During his fourth trip to New York in 1953, Thomas became gravely ill and fell into a coma. He died on 9 November, and his body was returned to Wales. On 25 November, he was interred at St. Martin's churchyard in Laugharne, Carmarthenshire.

Appraisals of Thomas's work have noted his original, rhythmic and ingenious use of words and imagery. Further appraisals following on from new critical editions of his poems have sought to explore in more depth his unique modernist poetic, setting aside the distracting legend of the "doomed poet", and seeking thereby to emphasise his status as a major poet of the 20th century.

== Life and career ==
=== Early life ===
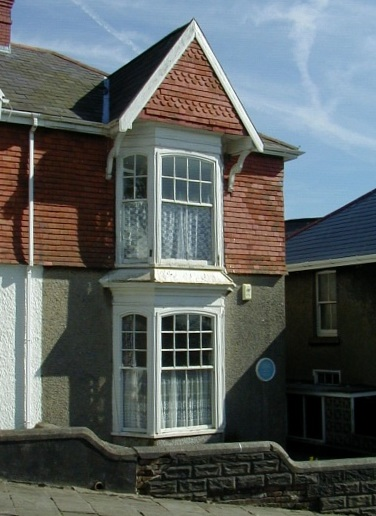
5 Cwmdonkin Drive, Swansea, the birthplace of Dylan Thomas

Dylan Thomas was born on 27 October 1914 (Note: In a letter to Rayner Heppenstall, dated 27 November 1939, he said he was born "about 11 p.m." (Ferris (1985), p. 432).) in Swansea, the son of Florence Hannah (née Williams), a seamstress, and David John 'Jack' Thomas, a teacher. His father had a first-class honours degree in English from University College, Aberystwyth, and ambitions to rise above his position teaching English literature at the local grammar school. Thomas had one sibling, Nancy Marles, who was eight years his senior.

The red-brick, semi-detached house at 5 Cwmdonkin Drive (in the Uplands area), in which Thomas was born and lived until he was 23, had been bought by his parents a few months before his birth.

At the 1921 census, Nancy and Dylan are noted as speaking both Welsh and English. Their parents were also bilingual in English and Welsh, and Jack Thomas taught Welsh at evening classes. One of their Swansea relations has recalled that, at home, "Both Auntie Florrie and Uncle Jack always spoke Welsh." There are three accounts from the 1940s of Dylan singing Welsh hymns and songs, and of speaking a little Welsh.

Thomas's father chose the name Dylan, which could be translated as "son of the sea" after Dylan ail Don, a character in The Mabinogion. His middle name, Marlais, was given in honour of his great-uncle, William Thomas, a Unitarian minister and poet whose bardic name was Gwilym Marles. The name Dylan being pronounced [ˈdəlan] in Welsh caused his mother to worry that he might be teased as the "dull one". When he broadcast on Welsh BBC early in his career, he was introduced using this pronunciation. Thomas later favoured the typical anglicised pronunciation and gave instructions that it should be pronounced that way (the same as Dillon /ˈdɪlən/).

==== Childhood ====
Thomas wrote a number of accounts of his childhood growing up in Swansea, (Note: See, for example, his radio broadcasts Reminiscences of Childhood, Memories of Childhood and Holiday Memory collected in Maud (1991).) and there are also accounts available by those who knew him as a young child. Thomas wrote several poems about his childhood and early teenage years, including "Once it was the colour of saying" and "The hunchback in the park", as well as short stories such as The Fight and A Child's Christmas in Wales.

Thomas's four grandparents played no part in his childhood. (Note: His maternal grandparents, Hannah and George Williams of 29, Delhi Street, St. Thomas, Swansea, had both died before he was born, as had his paternal grandfather, Evan Thomas, in Carmarthen. Evan's wife, Anne Thomas, died in January 1917, age 82. See Thomas (2003), pp. 180–188.) For the first ten years or so of his life, Thomas's Swansea aunts and uncles helped with his upbringing. These were his mother's three siblings, Polly and Bob, who lived in the St Thomas district of Swansea and Theodosia, and her husband, the Rev. David Rees, in Newton, Swansea, where parishioners recall Thomas sometimes staying for a month or so at a time. (Note: For more on David and Theodosia Rees and Thomas's stays with them, see Thomas (2003), pp. 217–218, and Thomas (2004), pp. 20–21, in which a parishioner notes "He'd stay for perhaps three weeks or a month there...And there wouldn't be his sister or mother or father. He'd often be there alone..." Kent Thompson has provided a similar account of Thomas holidaying with David and Theodosia Rees in Newton, "where he played in the chapel alley and waded in the muddy, unpaved streets." (K. E. Thompson (1965), Dylan Thomas in Swansea, pp. 62–63, Ph.D., University College of Swansea.)) All four aunts and uncles spoke Welsh and English.

Thomas's childhood also featured regular summer trips to the Llansteffan peninsula, a Welsh-speaking part of Carmarthenshire. In the land between Llangain and Llansteffan, his mother's family, the Williamses and their close relatives, worked a dozen farms with over a thousand acres between them. (Note: The main cluster of Williams farms included Waunfwlchan, Llwyngwyn, Maesgwyn, Pentowyn, Pencelli-uchaf and Penycoed. For more on both Thomas's farmyard and Swansea aunts, see Dylan and his aunties) The memory of Fernhill, a dilapidated 15-acre farm rented by his maternal aunt, Ann Jones, and her husband, Jim Jones, is evoked in the 1945 lyrical poem "Fern Hill", but is portrayed more accurately in his short story, The Peaches. (Note: Jim Jones did very little farming at Fernhill, as his neighbours noted: "Big in his ways—no work in him—left Fernhill farm to ruins—they were in a poor way—received £1 a week compensation—but there was nothing wrong with him." See Thomas, D. N. (2003) Dylan Remembered 1914–1934, vol. 1, p. 213. Jim and Annie rented Fernhill from Frances Maria Blumberg, the daughter of Robert Ricketts Evans, the so-called Fernhill hangman. They left Fernhill about 1929 and moved to Mount Pleasant, a ramshackle cottage up the lane from Blaencwm. See Thomas (2003), ch. 5.) Thomas also spent part of his summer holidays with Jim's sister, Rachel Jones, at neighbouring Pentrewyman farm, where he spent his time riding Prince the cart horse, chasing pheasants and fishing for trout.

All these relatives were bilingual, and many worshipped at Smyrna chapel in Llangain where the services were always in Welsh, including Sunday School which Thomas sometimes attended. There is also an account of the young Thomas being taught how to swear in Welsh. His schoolboy friends recalled that "It was all Welsh—and the children played in Welsh...he couldn't speak English when he stopped at Fernhill...in all his surroundings, everybody else spoke Welsh..." At the 1921 census, 95% of residents in the two parishes around Fernhill were Welsh speakers. Across the whole peninsula, 13%—more than 200 people—spoke only Welsh.

A few fields south of Fernhill lay Blaencwm, (Note: Blaencwm stood on a country lane just off the main road from Llangain to Llansteffan. It was just a short walk up the lane to his aunts and cousins in Llwyngwyn and Maesgwyn farms.) a pair of stone cottages to which his mother's Swansea siblings had retired, and with whom the young Thomas and his sister, Nancy, would sometimes stay. A couple of miles down the road from Blaencwm is the village of Llansteffan, where Thomas used to holiday at Rose Cottage with another Welsh-speaking aunt, Anne Williams, his mother's half-sister who had married into local gentry. Anne's daughter, Doris, married a dentist, Randy Fulleylove. The young Dylan also holidayed with them in Abergavenny, where Fulleylove had his practice.

Thomas's paternal grandparents, Anne and Evan Thomas, lived at The Poplars in Johnstown, just outside Carmarthen. Anne was the daughter of William Lewis, a gardener in the town. She had been born and brought up in Llangadog, as had her father, who is thought to be "Grandpa" in Thomas's short story A Visit to Grandpa's, in which Grandpa expresses his determination to be buried not in Llansteffan but in Llangadog.

Evan worked on the railways and was known as Thomas the Guard. His family had originated in another part of Welsh-speaking Carmarthenshire, in the farms that lay around the villages of Brechfa, Abergorlech, Gwernogle and Llanybydder, and which the young Thomas occasionally visited with his father. His father's side of the family also provided the young Thomas with another kind of experience; many lived in the towns of the South Wales industrial belt, including Port Talbot, Pontarddulais and Cross Hands.

Thomas had bronchitis and asthma in childhood and struggled with these throughout his life. He was indulged by his mother, Florence, and enjoyed being mollycoddled, a trait he carried into adulthood, becoming skilled in gaining attention and sympathy. But Florence would have known that child deaths had been a recurring event in the family's history, and it is said that she herself had lost a child soon after her marriage. If Thomas was protected and spoiled at home, however, the real spoilers were his many aunts and older cousins, those in both Swansea and the Llansteffan countryside. Some of them played an important part in both his upbringing and his later life, as Thomas's wife, Caitlin, has observed: "He couldn't stand their company for more than five minutes... Yet Dylan couldn't break away from them, either. They were the background from which he had sprung, and he needed that background all his life, like a tree needs roots.".

==== Education ====
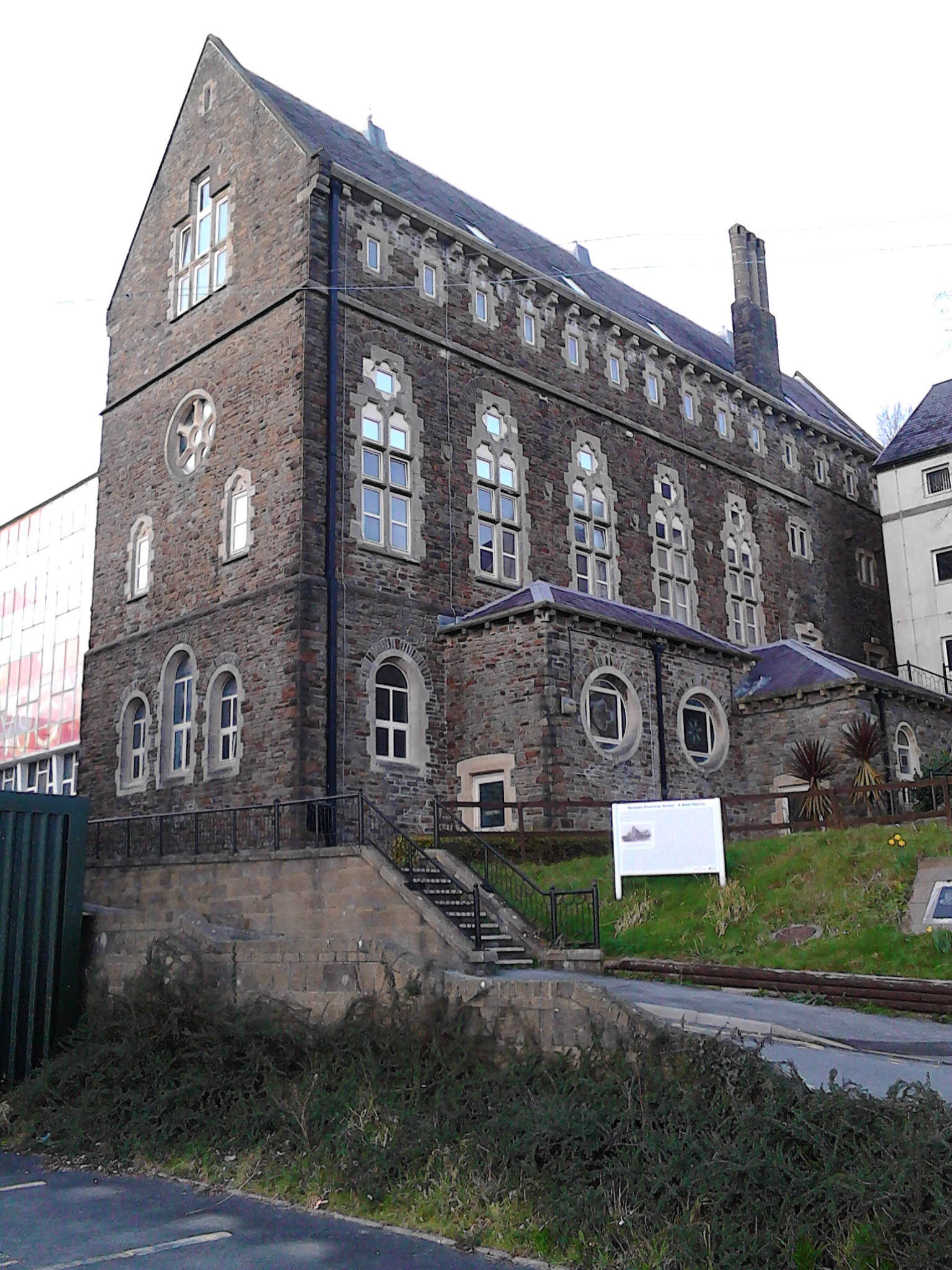
The main surviving structure of the former Swansea Grammar School on Mount Pleasant, mostly destroyed during the Swansea Blitz of 1941, was renamed the Dylan Thomas Building in 1988 to honour its former pupil. It was then part of the former Swansea Metropolitan University campus

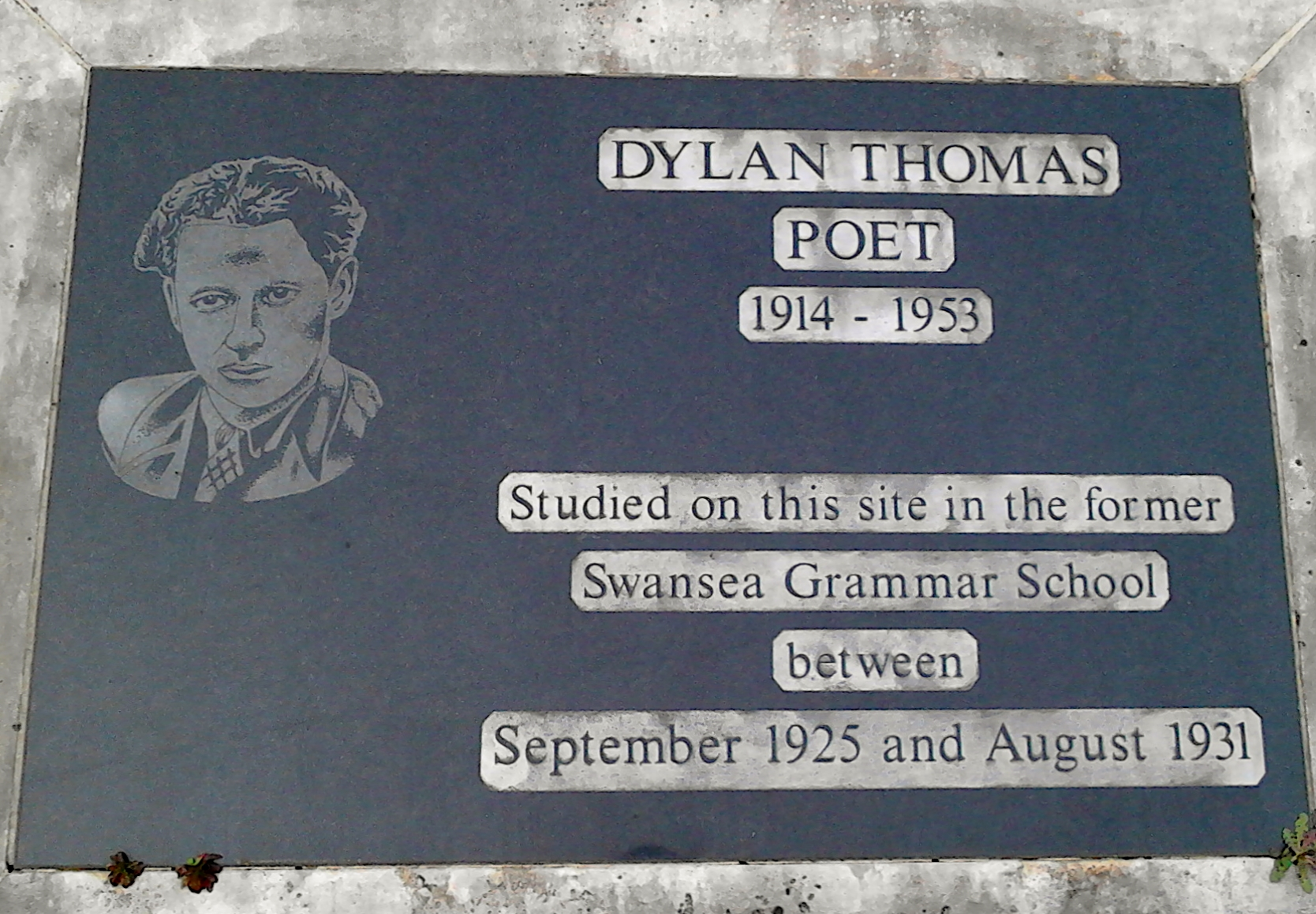
Memorial plaque on the former Mount Pleasant site of Swansea Grammar School

Thomas's formal education began at Mrs Hole's dame school, a private school on Mirador Crescent, a few streets away from his home. He described his experience there in Reminiscences of Childhood:

Never was there such a dame school as ours, so firm and kind and smelling of galoshes, with the sweet and fumbled music of the piano lessons drifting down from upstairs to the lonely schoolroom, where only the sometimes tearful wicked sat over undone sums, or to repent a little crime – the pulling of a girl's hair during geography, the sly shin kick under the table during English literature.

Alongside dame school, Thomas also took private lessons from Gwen James, an elocution teacher who had studied at drama school in London, winning several major prizes. She also taught "Dramatic Art" and "Voice Production", and would often help cast members of the Swansea Little Theatre (see below) with the parts they were playing. Thomas's parents' storytelling and dramatic talents, as well as their theatre-going interests, could also have contributed to the young Thomas's interest in performance.

In October 1925, Thomas enrolled at Swansea Grammar School for boys, in Mount Pleasant, where his father taught English. There are several accounts by his teachers and fellow pupils of Thomas's time at grammar school. In June 1928, Thomas won the school's mile race, held at St. Helen's Ground; he carried a newspaper photograph of his victory with him until his death. As a pupil he shied away from the school curriculum, preferring his own choice of reading, drama activities and contributing to the school's magazine of which he became editor. Examples of plagiarised poems he published under his own name in the magazine, and in some cases more widely, have been noted by his biographers. Subsequent research has revealed the extent and virtuosity of Thomas's plagiarism, including having a poem published in the nationally read Boy's Own Paper that had been published in the same magazine 15 years before. During his final school years he began writing his distinctively original poetry in notebooks; the first poem, dated 27 April (1930), is entitled "Osiris, come to Isis".

In 1931, when he was 16, Thomas left school to become a reporter for the South Wales Daily Post, where he remained for some 18 months. After leaving the newspaper, Thomas continued to work as a freelance journalist for several years, during which time he remained at Cwmdonkin Drive. He continued to add to his notebooks, which would eventually comprise over 200 poems in five books compiled between 1930 and 1935. Of the 90 poems he published, half were written during these years. The discovery in 2014 of the fifth notebook containing 16 poems, compiled between 1934 and August 1935, had substantial implications for the understanding of Thomas's poetic development as well as leading to a revision of the hitherto accepted chronology of composition dates for the poems.

==== On the stage ====
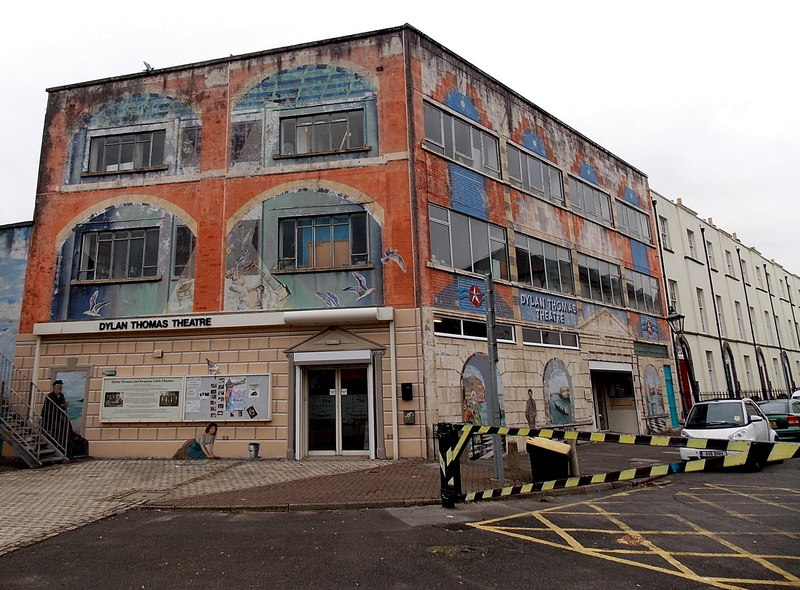
The Little Theatre relocated to Swansea's Maritime Quarter in 1979 and was renamed the Dylan Thomas Theatre in 1983

The stage was also an important part of Thomas's life from 1929 to 1934, as an actor, writer, producer and set painter. He took part in productions at Swansea Grammar School, and with the YMCA Junior Players and the Little Theatre, which was based in the Mumbles. It was also a touring company that took part in drama competitions and festivals around South Wales. Between October 1933 and March 1934, for example, Thomas and his fellow actors took part in five productions at the Mumbles theatre, as well as nine touring performances. Thomas continued with acting and production throughout his life, including his time in Laugharne, South Leigh and London (in the theatre and on radio), as well as taking part in nine stage readings of Under Milk Wood. The Shakespearian actor, John Laurie, who had worked with Thomas on both the stage and radio thought that Thomas would "have loved to have been an actor" and, had he chosen to do so, would have been "Our first real poet-dramatist since Shakespeare."

Painting the sets at the Little Theatre was just one aspect of the young Thomas's interest in art. His own drawings and paintings hung in his bedroom in Cwmdonkin Drive, and his early letters reveal a broader interest in art and art theory. Thomas saw writing a poem as an act of construction "as a sculptor works at stone," later advising a student "to treat words as a craftsman does his wood or stone...hew, carve, mould, coil, polish and plane them..." Throughout his life, his friends included artists, both in Swansea and in London, as well as in America.

In his free time, Thomas visited the cinema in Uplands, took walks along Swansea Bay, and frequented Swansea's pubs, especially the Antelope and the Mermaid Hotels in Mumbles. In the Kardomah Café, close to the newspaper office in Castle Street, he met his creative contemporaries, including his friend the poet Vernon Watkins and the musician and composer, Daniel Jones with whom, as teenagers, Thomas had helped to set up the "Warmley Broadcasting Corporation". This group of writers, musicians and artists became known as "The Kardomah Gang". This was also the period of his friendship with Bert Trick, a local shopkeeper, left-wing political activist and would-be poet, and with the Rev. Leon Atkin, a Swansea minister, human rights activist and local politician.

In 1933, Thomas visited London for probably the first time. (Note: In Ferris (1989), p. 86, Ferris writes that two of Thomas's friends had stated that they met him in London in 1932, though his late 1933 visit to the city is the first for which evidence exists.)

=== London, 1933–1939 ===
Thomas was a teenager when many of the poems for which he became famous were published: "And death shall have no dominion", "Before I Knocked" and "The Force That Through the Green Fuse Drives the Flower". "And death shall have no dominion" appeared in the New English Weekly in May 1933. In May 1934, Thomas made his first visit to Laugharne, "the strangest town in Wales", as he described it in an extended letter to Pamela Hansford Johnson, in which he also writes about the town's estuarine bleakness, and the dismal lives of the women cockle pickers working the shore around him.

And death shall have no dominion.
Dead men naked they shall be one
With the man in the wind and the west moon;
When their bones are picked clean and the clean bones gone,
They shall have stars at elbow and foot;
Though they go mad they shall be sane,
Though they sink through the sea they shall rise again
Though lovers be lost love shall not;
And death shall have no dominion.

— From "And death shall have no dominion"
Twenty-five Poems (1936)

From 1933 onwards, poet Victor Neuburg edited a section called "The Poet's Corner" in a British newspaper, the Sunday Referee. Here he encouraged new talent by awarding weekly prizes. One prize went to the then-unknown Thomas, and the publisher of the Sunday Referee sponsored and Neuburg arranged for the publication of Thomas's first book, 18 Poems, in December 1934. The anthology was published by Fortune Press, in part a vanity publisher that did not pay its writers and expected them to buy a certain number of copies themselves. 18 Poems was noted for its visionary qualities which led to critic Desmond Hawkins writing that the work was "the sort of bomb that bursts no more than once in three years". The volume was critically acclaimed, netting him new admirers from the London poetry world, including Edith Sitwell and Edwin Muir. When "Light breaks where no sun shines" appeared in The Listener in 1934, it caught the attention of three senior figures in literary London, T. S. Eliot, Geoffrey Grigson and Stephen Spender.

In December 1935, Thomas contributed the poem "The Hand That Signed the Paper" to Issue 18 of the bi-monthly New Verse. In 1936, his next collection Twenty-five Poems, published by J. M. Dent, also received much critical praise. Two years later, in 1938, Thomas won the Oscar Blumenthal Prize for Poetry; it was also the year in which New Directions offered to be his publisher in the United States. In all, he wrote half his poems while living at Cwmdonkin Drive before moving to London. During this time Thomas's reputation for heavy drinking developed.

By the late 1930s, Thomas was embraced as the "poetic herald" for a group of English poets, the New Apocalyptics. Thomas refused to align himself with them and declined to sign their manifesto. He later stated that he believed they were "intellectual muckpots leaning on a theory". Despite this, many of the group, including Henry Treece, modelled their work on Thomas's.

In the politically charged atmosphere of the 1930s Thomas's sympathies were very much with the radical left, to the point of his holding close links with the communists; he was also decidedly pacifist and anti-fascist. He was a supporter of the left-wing No More War Movement and boasted about participating in demonstrations against the British Union of Fascists. Bert Trick has provided an extensive account of an Oswald Mosley rally in the Plaza cinema in Swansea in July 1933 that he and Thomas attended.

==== Marriage ====
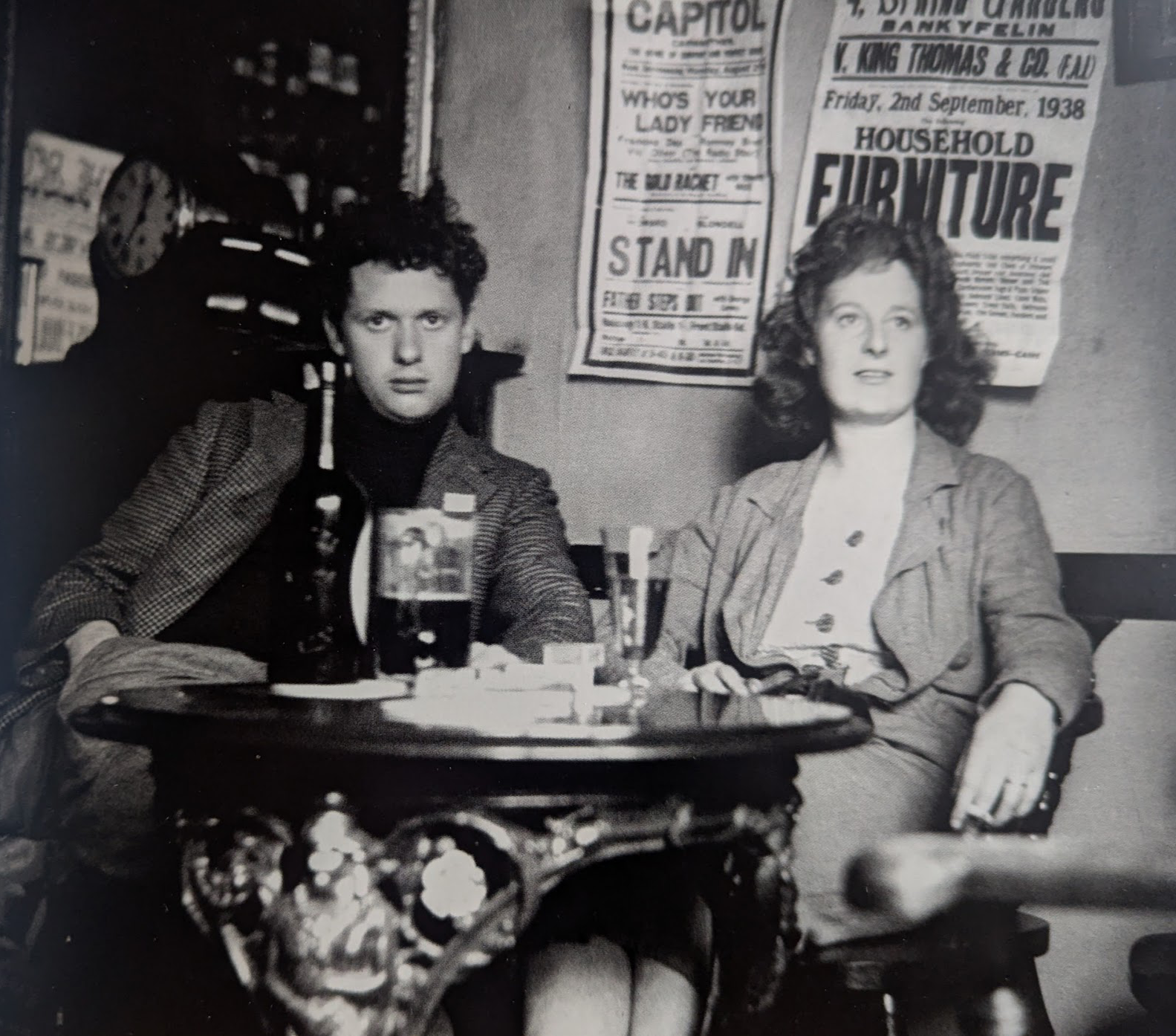
Dylan and Caitlin at Brown's Hotel, Laugharne in 1938. Taken by their Blashford family friend, the photographer and artist Nora Summers.

In early 1936, Thomas met Caitlin Macnamara (1913–1994), a 22-year-old dancer of Irish and French Quaker descent. She had run away from home, intent on making a career in dance, and aged 18 joined the chorus line at the London Palladium. Introduced by Augustus John, Caitlin's lover, they met in The Wheatsheaf pub on Rathbone Place in London's West End. Laying his head in her lap, a drunken Thomas proposed. Thomas liked to assert that he and Caitlin were in bed together ten minutes after they first met. Although Caitlin initially continued her relationship with John, she and Thomas began a correspondence, and in the second half of 1936 were courting. They married at the register office in Penzance, Cornwall, on 11 July 1937.

For the first months of their relationship and marriage the couple lived at the Macnamara family home in Blashford, Hampshire. In May 1938 they moved to Wales, to the village of Laugharne, Carmarthenshire where they rented a cottage in Gosport Street before moving into 'Sea View', a larger property, a couple of months later. They left Laugharne in July 1940 and then led a peripatetic lifestyle over the next few years, returning to Blashford and subsequently living at Marshfield (1940), Bishopston (1940–41), Chelsea, in London (1942–43), Talsarn (1942–44), East Knoyle, Beaconsfield (1944), Bosham, Sussex (1944), Blaencwm (Llansteffan) (1944 and 1945), New Quay (1944–45), and in premises arranged by Margaret Taylor, one of Dylan's benefactors (the wife of the historian A. J. P. Taylor), in the grounds of their Oxford home (1946–47) before moving to a property she purchased in the Oxfordshire village of South Leigh (1947–49). In May 1949, the Thomas family moved back to Laugharne into The Boat House, purchased by Margaret Taylor on their behalf. In 1951 Taylor purchased a second property in Camden Town, North London on their behalf where they stayed from October 1951 – January 1952.

Caitlin Thomas's autobiographies, Leftover Life to Kill (1957) and My Life with Dylan Thomas: Double Drink Story (1997), describe the effects of alcohol on their relationship: "Ours was not only a love story, it was a drink story, because without alcohol it would never had got on its rocking feet", she wrote, and "The bar was our altar." Biographer Andrew Lycett describes the relationship as one of alcoholic co-dependency and notes how deeply Caitlin resented her husband's numerous extramarital affairs.

Dylan and Caitlin Thomas had three children: Llewelyn Edouard (1939–2000), Aeronwy Thomas-Ellis (1943–2009) and Colm Garan Hart (1949–2012). Llewelyn and Aeronwy were privately educated, at the Magdalen College School, Oxford and at the Arts Education School in Tring, Hertfordshire, respectively.

=== Wartime 1939–1945 ===
In 1939, a collection of 16 poems and seven of the 20 short stories published by Thomas in magazines since 1934, appeared as The Map of Love. Ten stories in his next book, Portrait of the Artist as a Young Dog (1940), were based less on lavish fantasy than those in The Map of Love and more on real-life romances featuring himself in Wales. Sales of both books were poor, resulting in Thomas living on meagre fees from writing and reviewing. At this time he borrowed heavily from friends and acquaintances. Hounded by creditors, Thomas and his family left Laugharne in July 1940 and moved to the home of critic John Davenport in Marshfield near Chippenham in Gloucestershire. (Note: Davenport was, for many years, literary editor of The Observer newspaper. "From July to November 1940 Dylan Thomas and his family stayed at 'The Malting House' 78 High Street, Marshfield, near Chippenham in Gloucestershire, with the critic John Davenport and his American painter wife, Clement, who kept an open house for musicians and writers. The composers Lennox Berkeley and Arnold Cooke, the music critic William Glock and writer Antonia White, joined them.") There Thomas collaborated with Davenport on the satire The Death of the King's Canary, though due to fears of libel the work was not published until 1976.

At the outset of the Second World War, worried about conscription, Thomas unsuccessfully sought employment in a reserved occupation with the Ministry of Information. However, an "unreliable lung", as he described his chronic condition—coughing sometimes confined him to bed, and he had a history of bringing up blood and mucus—proved to be the grounds for the military authorities to allocate him a C3 category medical exemption which meant that he would be among the last to be called up for service. He would subsequently be recognised as engaged in essential war work through his role in broadcasting for the BBC and documentary filmmaking, work he took up in 1941 after he and Caitlin moved to London, leaving their son with Caitlin's mother at Blashford. Thomas produced film scripts for the Strand Film Company, work which provided him with a much needed financial mainstay throughout the war years and his first regular source of income since working for the South Wales Daily Post.

In February 1941, Swansea was bombed by the Luftwaffe in the Three Nights' Blitz. Castle Street was one of many streets that suffered badly; rows of shops, including the Kardomah Café, were destroyed. Thomas walked through the bombed-out shell of the town centre with his friend Bert Trick. Upset at the sight, he concluded: "Our Swansea has died". Thomas later wrote a feature programme for the radio, Return Journey, describing how: "The Kardomah Café was razed to the snow, the voices of the coffee drinkers—poets, painters, and musicians in their beginnings—all lost". The programme, produced by Philip Burton, was first broadcast on 15 June 1947. The Kardomah Café reopened on Portland Street after the war.

In early 1943, Thomas began a relationship with Pamela Glendower, one of several affairs he had during his marriage. The affairs either ran out of steam or were halted after Caitlin discovered his infidelity. In March 1943, Caitlin gave birth to a daughter, Aeronwy, in London. They lived in a run-down studio in Chelsea, made up of a single large room with a curtain to separate the kitchen.

==== Escaping to Wales ====
The Thomas family also made several escapes back to Wales. Between 1941 and 1943, they lived intermittently in Plas Gelli, Talsarn, in Cardiganshire. Plas Gelli sits close by the River Aeron, after whom Aeronwy is thought to have been named. Some of Thomas's letters from Gelli can be found in his Collected Letters whilst an extended account of Thomas's time there can be found in D. N. Thomas's book, Dylan Thomas: A Farm, Two Mansions and a Bungalow (2000). The Thomases shared the mansion with his childhood friends from Swansea, Vera and Evelyn Phillips. Vera's friendship with the Thomases in nearby New Quay is portrayed in the 2008 film The Edge of Love.

In July 1944, with the threat in London of German flying bombs, Thomas moved to the family cottage at Blaencwm near Llangain, Carmarthenshire, where he resumed writing poetry, completing Holy Spring and Vision and Prayer.

In September that year, the Thomas family moved to New Quay in Cardiganshire (Ceredigion), where they rented Majoda, a wood and asbestos bungalow on the cliffs overlooking Cardigan Bay. (Note: See Thomas's letters from Majoda, 1 September 1944 to 5 July 1945 in Ferris (1985).) It was there that Thomas wrote a radio piece about New Quay, Quite Early One Morning, a sketch for his later work, Under Milk Wood. Of the poetry written at this time, of note is Fern Hill, started while living in New Quay, continued at Blaencwm in July and August 1945 and first published in October 1945 (Note: Brinnin (1955), p. 104 states that on a visit to Laugharne in 1951 he was shown "more than two hundred separate and distinct versions of the poem (Fern Hill)" by Thomas.)

Thomas's nine months in New Quay, said first biographer, Constantine FitzGibbon, were "a second flowering, a period of fertility that recalls the earliest days…[with a] great outpouring of poems", as well as a good deal of other material. His second biographer, Paul Ferris, agreed: "On the grounds of output, the bungalow deserves a plaque of its own." Thomas's third biographer, George Tremlett, concurred, describing the time in New Quay as "one of the most creative periods of Thomas's life." Walford Davies, who co-edited the 1995 definitive edition of the play, has noted that New Quay "was crucial in supplementing the gallery of characters Thomas had to hand for writing Under Milk Wood."

==== War poetry ====
Thomas's horror of war, foreshadowed in some of his poems of the 1930s and fuelled by his lived experience of the bombing raids and fire storms of the Blitz in London, received further expression in his poems of the war period. These include elegies for an elderly man—Among Those Killed in a Dawn Raid Was a Man Aged a Hundred (1941)—and for child victims of incendiary bombing raids in Ceremony After a Fire Raid (1944) and A Refusal to Mourn the Death, by Fire, of a Child in London (1945). They were collected in Deaths and Entrances, the fourth volume of his poetry, published in 1946. The sentiments expressed in his war poems were, according to Walford Davies, representative of "the real temper of the British people of the time—the resilience and the guts".

=== Making films 1941–1948 ===
From September 1941 Thomas worked for the Strand Film Company in London. Strand produced films for the Ministry of Information and Thomas produced film scripts for six such films in 1942: This is Colour (on aniline dye processing), New Towns for Old, Balloon Site 568 (a recruitment film), CEMA (on arts organisation), Young Farmers and Battle for Freedom. He also scripted and produced Wales – Green Mountain, Black Mountain, a British Council commission and a bi-lingual production. These Are The Men (1943) was a more ambitious piece in which Thomas's verse accompanies Leni Riefenstahl's footage of an early Nuremberg Rally. (Note: According to Ferris (1989), p. 190, the footage was taken from Riefenstahl's 1935 propaganda film Triumph of the Will.) Conquest of a Germ (1944) explored the use of early antibiotics in the fight against pneumonia and tuberculosis. Our Country (1945) was a romantic tour of Britain set to Thomas's poetry.

Thomas continued to work in the film industry after the war, working on feature film scripts which included: No Room at the Inn (1948), The Three Weird Sisters (1948), The Doctor and the Devils (1944—not produced until 1985) and Rebecca's Daughters (1948—not produced until 1992). His screenplay for The Beach of Falesá, not produced as a film, received a BBC Radio 3 production in May 2014. Altogether in his work in the film industry Thomas produced 28 film scripts (not all of which reached production) as well as acting as producer and director in some cases. When recession overtook the film industry in the late 1940s he lost his most reliable source of income. The experience he gained in his film work was a significant factor, according to Walford Davies, in the maturation of Under Milk Wood.

=== Broadcasting years 1945–1949 ===
Although Thomas had previously written for the BBC, it was a minor and intermittent source of income. In 1943, he wrote and recorded a 15-minute talk titled "Reminiscences of Childhood" for the Welsh BBC. In December 1944, he recorded Quite Early One Morning (produced by Aneirin Talfan Davies, again for the Welsh BBC) but when Davies offered it for national broadcast BBC London turned it down. On 31 August 1945, the BBC Home Service broadcast Quite Early One Morning and, in the three years beginning in October 1945, Thomas made over a hundred broadcasts for the corporation. Thomas was employed not only for his poetry readings, but for discussions and critiques.

And death shall have no dominion
Thomas reads "And death shall have no dominion" for a 1953 recording

In the second half of 1945, Thomas began reading for the BBC Radio programme, Book of Verse, broadcast weekly to the Far East. This provided Thomas with a regular income and brought him into contact with Louis MacNeice, a congenial drinking companion whose advice Thomas cherished. On 29 September 1946, the BBC began transmitting the Third Programme, a high-culture network which provided opportunities for Thomas. He appeared in the play Comus for the Third Programme, the day after the network launched, and his rich, sonorous voice led to character parts, including the lead in Aeschylus's Agamemnon and Satan in an adaptation of Paradise Lost. Thomas remained a popular guest on radio talk shows for the BBC, who regarded him as "useful should a younger generation poet be needed". He had an uneasy relationship with BBC management and a staff job was never an option, with drinking cited as the problem. Despite this, Thomas became a familiar radio voice and within Britain was "in every sense a celebrity". The publication of Deaths and Entrances in February 1946 was a major turning point for Thomas. Poet and critic Walter J. Turner commented in The Spectator, "This book alone, in my opinion, ranks him as a major poet".

==== Italy, South Leigh and Prague ====
The following year, in April 1947, the Thomases travelled to Italy, after Thomas had been awarded a Society of Authors scholarship. They stayed first in villas near Rapallo and then Florence, before moving to a hotel in Rio Marina on the island of Elba. On their return, Thomas and family moved, in September 1947, into the Manor House in South Leigh, just west of Oxford, purchased and rented to Thomas for £1 per week by Margaret Taylor. He continued with his work for the BBC, completed a number of film scripts and worked further on his ideas for Under Milk Wood, including a discussion in late 1947 of The Village of the Mad (as the play was then called) with the BBC producer Philip Burton. He later recalled that, during the meeting, Thomas had discussed his ideas for having a blind narrator, an organist who played for a dog and two lovers who wrote to each other every day but never met.

In March 1949 Thomas travelled to Prague. He had been invited by the Czech government to attend the inauguration of the Czechoslovak Writers' Union. Jiřina Hauková, who had previously published translations of some of Thomas's poems, was his guide and interpreter. (Note: On her translations, see Thomas (2004), pp. 154–172.) In her memoir, Hauková recalls that at a party in Prague, Thomas "narrated the first version of his radio play Under Milk Wood." She describes how he outlined the plot about a town that was declared insane, mentioning the organist who played for sheep and goats (Note: The lines about Organ Morgan playing for sheep are found at the very end of the play. See Davies & Maud (1995), p. 61.) and the baker with two wives.

==== Return to Laugharne ====
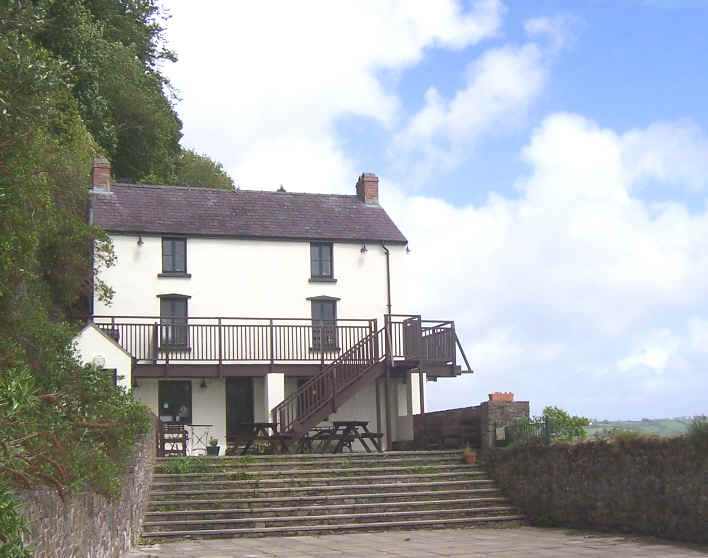
The Boathouse, Laugharne, the Thomas family home from 1949

A month later, in May 1949, Thomas and his family moved to his final home, the Boat House at Laugharne, purchased for him at a cost of £2,500 in April 1949 by Margaret Taylor. Thomas acquired a garage a hundred yards from the house on a cliff ledge which he turned into his writing shed, and where he wrote several of his most acclaimed poems. He also rented "Pelican House" opposite his regular drinking den, Brown's Hotel, for his parents who lived there from 1949 until 1953.

Dylan Thomas's writing shed
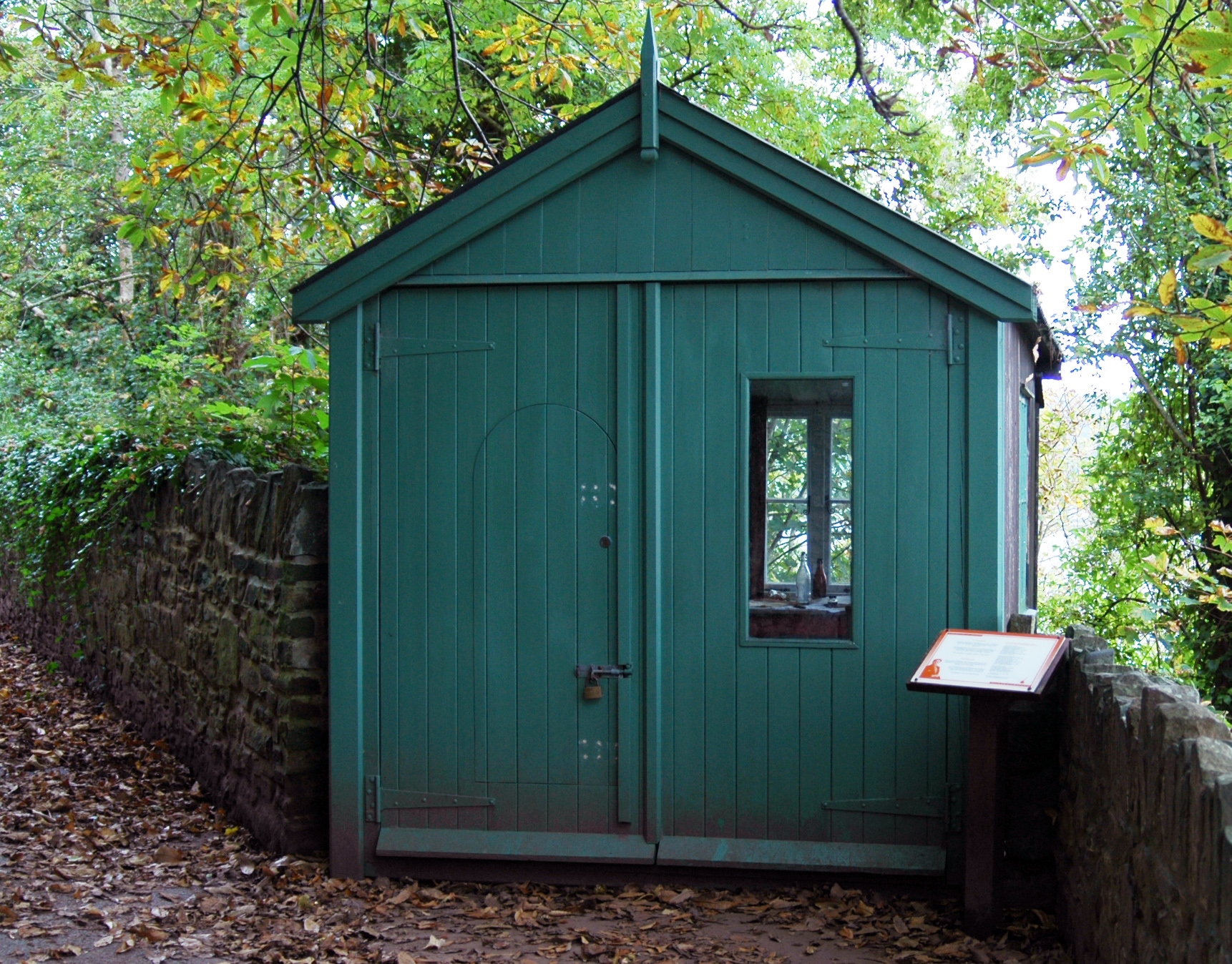
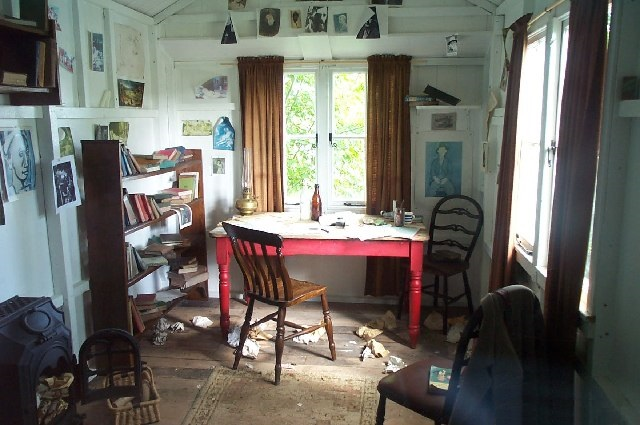

Caitlin gave birth to their third child, a boy named Colm Garan Hart, on 25 July 1949.

In October, the New Zealand poet, Allen Curnow, came to visit Thomas at the Boat House, who took him to his writing shed and "fished out a draft to show me of the unfinished Under Milk Wood" that was, says Curnow, titled The Town That Was Mad. This is the first known sighting of the script of the play that was to become Under Milk Wood.

=== America, Iran, and Under Milk Wood, 1950–1953 ===
American poet John Brinnin invited Thomas to New York, where in February 1950 they embarked on a lucrative three-month tour of arts centres and campuses. The tour, which began in front of an audience of a thousand at the Kaufmann Auditorium of the Poetry Centre in New York, took in about 40 venues. (Note: FitzGibbon (1965) lists 39 venues visited in the first US trip, compiled with the help of John Brinnin, but accepts that some locations may have been missed.) During the tour, Thomas was invited to many parties and functions and on several occasions became drunk—going out of his way to shock people—and was a difficult guest. Thomas drank before some of his readings, though it is argued he may have pretended to be more affected by it than he actually was. The writer Elizabeth Hardwick recalled how intoxicating a performer he was and how the tension would build before a performance: "Would he arrive only to break down on the stage? Would some dismaying scene take place at the faculty party? Would he be offensive, violent, obscene?" Caitlin said in her memoir, "Nobody ever needed encouragement less, and he was drowned in it."

On returning to Britain, Thomas began work on two further poems, "In the white giant's thigh", which he read on the Third Programme in September 1950, and the incomplete "In country heaven". In October, Thomas sent a draft of the first 39 pages of 'The Town That Was Mad' to the BBC. The task of seeing this work through to production as Under Milk Wood was assigned to the BBC's Douglas Cleverdon, who had been responsible for casting Thomas in 'Paradise Lost'.

Despite Cleverdon's urgings, the script slipped from Thomas's priorities and in January 1951 he went to Iran to work on a film for the Anglo-Iranian Oil Company, an assignment which Callard has speculated was undertaken on behalf of British intelligence agencies. Thomas toured the country with the film crew, and his letters home vividly express his shock and anger with the poverty he saw around him. He also gave a reading at the British Council and talked with a number of Iranian intellectuals, including Ebrahim Golestan whose account of his meeting with Thomas has been translated and published. The film was never made, with Thomas returning to Wales in February, though his time in Iran allowed him to provide a few minutes of material for a BBC documentary Persian Oil. Thomas's journey through Iran has also been the subject of the 2024 documentary film Pouring Water on Troubled Oil. The film was written and directed by Nariman Massoumi, Department of Film and Television at the University of Bristol, with narration by Michael Sheen.

Later that year, Thomas published two poems, which have been described as "unusually blunt." They were an ode, in the form of a villanelle, to his dying father, Do not go gentle into that good night, and the ribald Lament.

Although he had a range of wealthy patrons, including Margaret Taylor, Princess Marguerite Caetani and Marged Howard-Stepney, Thomas was still in financial difficulty, and he wrote several begging letters to notable literary figures, including T. S. Eliot. Taylor was not keen on Thomas taking another trip to the United States, and thought that if he had a permanent address in London he would be able to gain steady work there. She bought a property, 54 Delancey Street, in Camden Town, and in late 1951 Thomas and Caitlin lived in the basement flat. Thomas would describe the flat as his "London house of horror" and did not return there after his 1952 tour of America.

==== Second tour 20 January to 16 May 1952 ====
Thomas undertook a second tour of the United States in 1952, this time with Caitlin—after she had discovered he had been unfaithful on his earlier trip. They drank heavily, and Thomas began to suffer with gout and lung problems. The second tour was the most intensive of the four, taking in 46 engagements. The trip also resulted in Thomas recording his first poetry to vinyl, which Caedmon Records released in America later that year. One of his works recorded during this time, A Child's Christmas in Wales, became his most popular prose work in America. The original 1952 recording of the book was a 2008 selection for the United States National Recording Registry, stating that it is "credited with launching the audiobook industry in the United States".

A shortened version of the first half of The Town That Was Mad was published in Botteghe Oscure in May 1952, with the title Llareggub. A Piece for Radio Perhaps. Thomas had been in Laugharne for almost three years, but his half-play had made little progress since his time living in South Leigh. By the summer of 1952, the half-play's title had been changed to Under Milk Wood because John Brinnin thought the title Llareggub would not attract American audiences. On 6 November 1952, Thomas wrote to the editor of Botteghe Oscure to explain why he hadn't been able to "finish the second half of my piece for you." He had failed shamefully, he said, to add to "my lonely half of a looney maybe-play".

On 10 November 1952 Thomas's last collection Collected Poems, 1934–1952, was published by Dent; he was 38. It won the Foyle poetry prize. Reviewing the volume, critic Philip Toynbee declared that "Thomas is the greatest living poet in the English language". The winter of 1952/3 brought much personal tragedy: Thomas's father died from pneumonia just before Christmas 1952; and in the Spring of 1953 his sister died from liver cancer, one of his patrons overdosed, three friends died at young ages and Caitlin had an abortion.

==== Third tour 21 April to 3 June 1953 ====
In April 1953, Thomas returned alone for a third tour of America. He performed a "work in progress" version of Under Milk Wood, solo, for the first time at Harvard University on 3 May. A week later, the work was performed with a full cast at the Poetry Centre in New York. He met the deadline only after being locked in a room by Brinnin's assistant, Liz Reitell, and he was still editing the script on the afternoon of the performance; its last lines were handed to the actors as they were putting on their makeup.

During this penultimate tour, Thomas met the composer Igor Stravinsky who had become an admirer after having been introduced to his poetry by W. H. Auden. They had discussions about collaborating on a "musical theatrical work" for which Thomas would provide the libretto on the theme of "the rediscovery of love and language in what might be left after the world after the bomb." The letters Stravinsky sent to Thomas during this period testify not only to the composer's sustained interest in bringing the projected opera to fruition but also to the friendship and affection that developed between them, which in turn fueled their shared excitement about a project they envisioned as both artistically ambitious and urgently attuned to the anxieties of their time.(The Opera that Never Was) The shock of Thomas's death later in the year moved Stravinsky to compose his In Memoriam Dylan Thomas for tenor, string quartet and four trombones. The first performance in Los Angeles in 1954 was introduced with a tribute to Thomas from Aldous Huxley.

Thomas spent the last nine or ten days of his third tour in New York mostly in the company of Reitell, with whom he had an affair. During this time, Thomas fractured his arm falling down a flight of stairs when drunk. Reitell's doctor, Milton Feltenstein, put his arm in plaster and treated him for gout and gastritis.

After returning home, Thomas worked on Under Milk Wood in Laugharne. Aeronwy, his daughter, noticed that his health had "visibly deteriorated...I could hear his racking cough. Every morning he had a prolonged coughing attack...The coughing was nothing new but it seemed worse than before." She also noted that the blackouts that Thomas was experiencing were "a constant source of comment" amongst his Laugharne friends.

Thomas sent the original manuscript to Douglas Cleverdon on 15 October 1953. It was copied and returned to Thomas, who lost it in a pub in London and required a duplicate to take to America. Thomas flew to the States on 19 October 1953 for what would be his final tour. He died in New York before the BBC could record Under Milk Wood. Richard Burton starred in the first broadcast in 1954, and was joined by Elizabeth Taylor in a subsequent film. In 1954, the play won the Prix Italia for literary or dramatic programmes. (Note: The BBC submitted the play posthumously along with a French translation by Jacques-Bernard Brunius.)

=== Final tour and death in New York ===
Thomas left Laugharne on 9 October 1953 on the first leg of his fourth trip to America. He called on his mother, Florence, to say goodbye: "He always felt that he had to get out from this country because of his chest being so bad." Thomas had suffered from chest problems for most of his life, though they began in earnest soon after he moved in May 1949 to the Boat House at Laugharne—the "bronchial heronry", as he called it. Within weeks of moving in, he visited a local doctor, who prescribed medicine for both his chest and throat.

While waiting in London before his flight, Thomas stayed with the comedian Harry Locke and worked on Under Milk Wood. Locke noted that Thomas was having trouble with his chest, "terrible" coughing fits that made him go purple in the face. He was also using an inhaler to help his breathing. There were reports, too, that Thomas was also having blackouts. His visit to the BBC producer Philip Burton, a few days before he left for New York, was interrupted by a blackout. On his last night in London, he had another in the company of his fellow poet Louis MacNeice.

Thomas arrived in New York on 20 October 1953 to undertake further performances of Under Milk Wood, organised by John Brinnin, his American agent and Director of the Poetry Centre. Brinnin did not travel to New York but remained in Boston to write. He handed responsibility to his assistant, Liz Reitell. She met Thomas at Idlewild Airport and was shocked at his appearance. He looked pale, delicate and shaky, not his usual robust self: "He was very ill when he got here." After being taken by Reitell to check in at the Chelsea Hotel, Thomas took the first rehearsal of Under Milk Wood. They then went to the White Horse Tavern in Greenwich Village, before returning to the Chelsea Hotel.

The next day, Reitell invited him to her apartment, but he declined. They went sightseeing, but Thomas felt unwell and retired to his bed for the rest of the afternoon. Reitell gave him half a grain (32.4 milligrams) of phenobarbitone to help him sleep and spent the night at the hotel with him. Two days later, on 23 October, at the third rehearsal, Thomas said he was too ill to take part, but he struggled on, shivering and burning with fever, before collapsing on the stage.

The following day, 24 October, Reitell took Thomas to see her doctor, Milton Feltenstein, who administered cortisone injections and Thomas made it through the first performance that evening, but collapsed immediately afterwards. "This circus out there," he told a friend who had come back-stage, "has taken the life out of me for now." Reitell later said that Feltenstein was "rather a wild doctor who thought injections would cure anything."

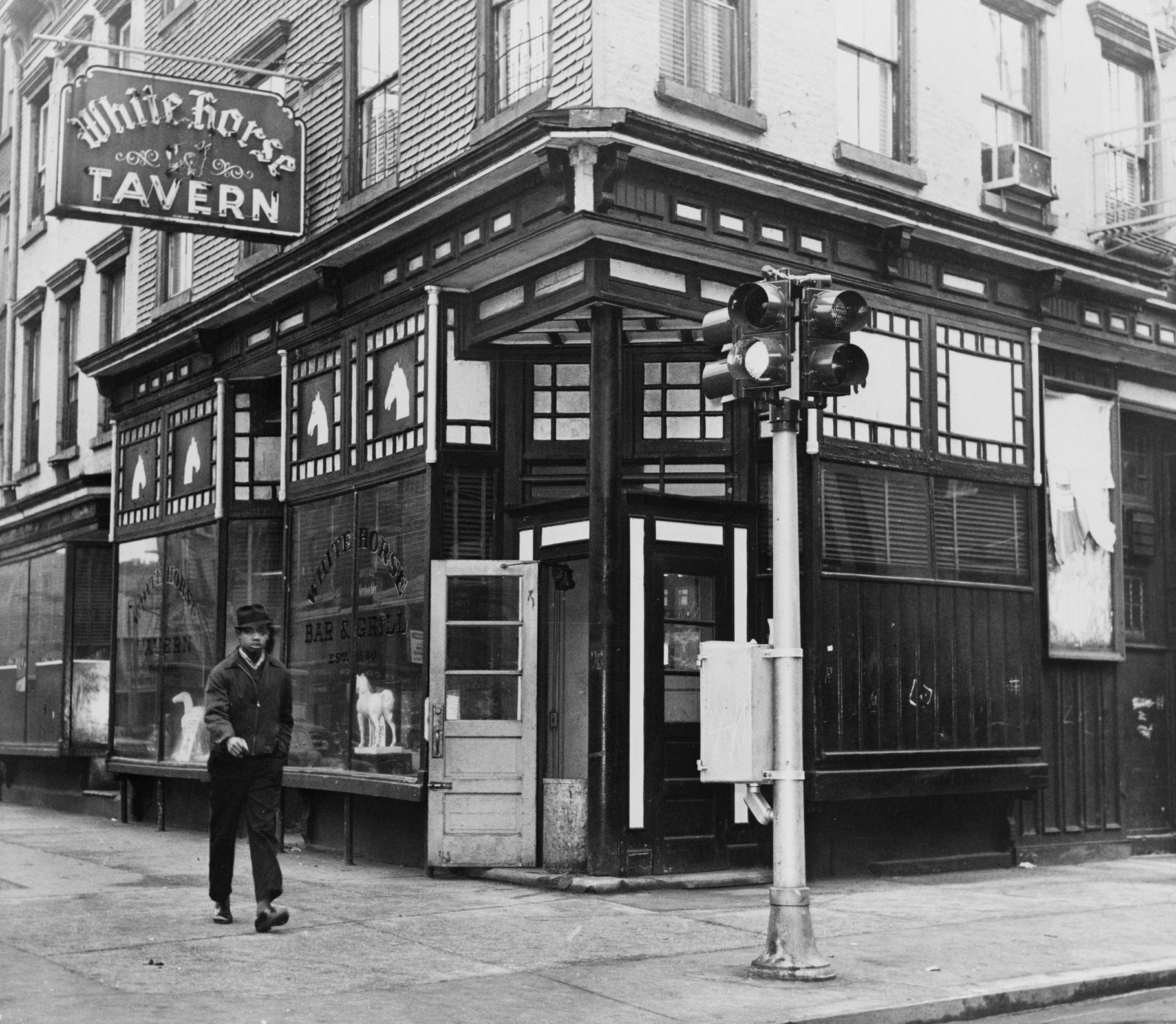
The White Horse Tavern in New York City, where Thomas was drinking shortly before his death

At the next performance on 25 October, his fellow actors realised that Thomas was very ill: "He was desperately ill…we didn't think that he would be able to do the last performance because he was so ill…Dylan literally couldn't speak he was so ill…still my greatest memory of it is that he had no voice."

On the evening of 27 October, Thomas attended his 39th birthday party but felt unwell and returned to his hotel after an hour. The next day, he took part in Poetry and the Film, a recorded symposium at Cinema 16.

A turning point came on 2 November. Air pollution in New York had risen significantly and exacerbated chest illnesses such as Thomas's. By the end of the month, over 200 New Yorkers had died from the smog. On 3 November, Thomas spent most of the day in his room, entertaining various friends. He went out in the evening to keep two drink appointments. After returning to the hotel, he went out again for a drink at 2 am. After drinking at the White Horse, Thomas returned to the Hotel Chelsea, declaring, "I've had 18 straight whiskies. I think that's the record!" The barman and the owner of the pub who served him later commented that Thomas could not have drunk more than half that amount.

Thomas had an appointment at a clam house in New Jersey with Ruthven Todd on 4 November. When Todd telephoned the Chelsea that morning, Thomas said he was feeling ill and postponed the engagement. Todd thought he sounded "terrible". The poet, Harvey Breit, was another to phone that morning. He thought that Thomas sounded "bad". Thomas's voice, recalled Breit, was "low and hoarse". He had wanted to say: "You sound as though from the tomb", but instead he told Thomas that he sounded like Louis Armstrong.

Later, Thomas went drinking with Reitell at the White Horse and, feeling sick again, returned to the hotel. Feltenstein came to see him three times that day, administering the cortisone secretant ACTH by injection and, on his third visit, half a grain (32.4 milligrams) of morphine sulphate. This amount was three times more than was medically appropriate and was, by affecting Thomas's breathing and consequently the oxygen supply to his brain, the precipitating cause of the coma from which he would never awake. After Reitell became increasingly concerned and telephoned Feltenstein for advice he suggested she get male assistance, so she called upon the painter Jack Heliker, who arrived before 11 pm. At midnight on 5 November, Thomas's breathing became more difficult and his face turned blue. Reitell phoned Feltenstein who arrived at the hotel at about 1 am, and called for an ambulance. (Note: Ruthven Todd states in his letter dated 23 November that the police were called, who then called the ambulance, while Ferris in his 1989 biography writes that Feltenstein was summoned again and called the ambulance. D. N. Thomas concurs that Feltenstein eventually returned at 1 am and summoned the ambulance.) It then took another hour for the ambulance to arrive at St. Vincent's, even though it was only a few blocks from the Chelsea.

Thomas was admitted to the emergency ward at St Vincent's Hospital at 1:58 am. He was comatose, and his medical notes state that "the impression upon admission was acute alcoholic encephalopathy damage to the brain by alcohol, for which the patient was treated without response". Feltenstein then took control of Thomas's care, even though he did not have admitting rights at St. Vincent's. The hospital's senior brain specialist, C. G. Gutierrez-Mahoney, was not called to examine Thomas until the afternoon of 6 November, some 36 hours after Thomas's admission.

Caitlin, having flown from Britain, arrived at the hospital the following morning, by which time a tracheotomy had been performed. Her first words are reported to have been, "Is the bloody man dead yet?" Permitted to see Thomas for a short time, she returned, drunk, in the afternoon and made threats to John Brinnin. Feltenstein had her put into a straitjacket and committed to the River Crest Sanitarium.

It is now believed that Thomas had been suffering from bronchitis, pneumonia, emphysema and asthma before his admission to St Vincent's. In their 2004 paper, Death by Neglect, D. N. Thomas and former GP Principal Simon Barton disclose that Thomas was found to have pneumonia when he was admitted to hospital in a coma. Doctors took three hours to restore his breathing, using artificial respiration and oxygen. Summarising their findings, they conclude: "The medical notes indicate that, on admission, Dylan's bronchial disease was found to be very extensive, affecting upper, mid and lower lung fields, both left and right." The forensic pathologist, Bernard Knight, who examined the post-mortem report, concurs: "death was clearly due to a severe lung infection with extensive advanced bronchopneumonia...the severity of the chest infection, with greyish consolidated areas of well-established pneumonia, suggests that it had started before admission to hospital."

Thomas died at noon on 9 November 1953, having never recovered from his coma. A nurse, and the poet John Berryman, were present with him at the time of death.

=== Aftermath ===
Rumours circulated of a brain haemorrhage, followed by competing reports of a mugging or even that Thomas had drunk himself to death. Later, speculation arose about drugs and diabetes. At the post-mortem, the pathologist found three causes of death—pneumonia, brain swelling and a fatty liver. His liver showed no sign of cirrhosis. Many sources have criticised Feltenstein's role and actions, especially his incorrect diagnosis of delirium tremens and the high dose of morphine he administered. Dr C. G. de Gutierrez-Mahoney, the neurosurgeon who treated Thomas while at St. Vincents, concluded that Feltenstein's failure to see that Thomas was gravely ill and have him admitted to hospital sooner "was even more culpable than his use of morphine".

The publication of John Brinnin's 1955 biography Dylan Thomas in America cemented Thomas's reputation as a "roistering, drunken and doomed poet"; Brinnin focuses on Thomas's last few years and paints a picture of him as a drunk and a philanderer. Later biographies have criticised Brinnin's view, especially his coverage of Thomas's death. David Thomas in Fatal Neglect: Who Killed Dylan Thomas? writes that Brinnin, along with Reitell and Feltenstein, were culpable. Ferris in his 1989 biography references Thomas's heavy drinking, but is more critical of those around him in his final days and does not draw the conclusion that he drank himself to death. Whilst his heavy alcohol consumption is seen as a contributory factor to his final illness, Andrew Sinclair and George Tremlett express the view that Thomas was not an alcoholic. Likewise Constantine Fitzgibbon, his first biographer and friend, who was personally familiar with Thomas's drinking habits, notes that though there were multiple episodes of excessive alcohol consumption, there were also lengthy periods of relative abstinence.

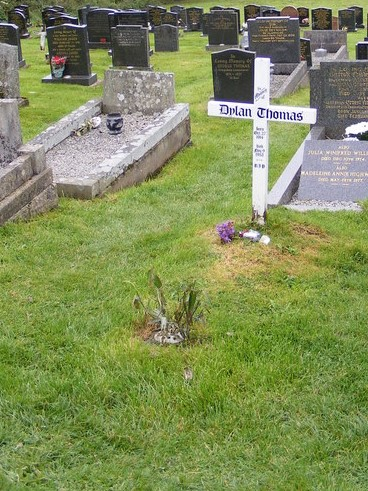
Thomas's grave at St Martin's Church, Laugharne

Thomas's body was brought back to Wales for burial in the village churchyard at Laugharne. Thomas's funeral, which Brinnin did not attend, took place at St Martin's Church in Laugharne on 24 November. Six friends from the village carried Thomas's coffin. Caitlin, without her customary hat, walked behind the coffin with his childhood friend Daniel Jones at her arm and her mother by her side. The procession to the church was filmed and the wake took place at Brown's Hotel. Thomas's fellow poet and long-time friend Vernon Watkins wrote The Times obituary.

Though Thomas died intestate, with assets worth £100, substantial royalties would accrue from sales of his work, with half the proceeds allocated to Caitlin and half to the three children. A trust was established to administer the estate and protect the copyright of Thomas's work. Trustees included Daniel Jones, Wynford Vaughan Thomas and, in an unlikely development given his low opinion of Thomas, Kingsley Amis, who was appointed at the behest of the Thomas family solicitor and administrator of the trust, Stuart Thomas. After Caitlin, troubled by painful memories, left Laugharne to live in Italy, the Thomas family home, the Boathouse, became the home of her mother-in-law, Florence, for the last five years of her life. It was subsequently purchased by the trust from Margaret Taylor on behalf of Caitlin who sold it on to an educational charity before it was eventually acquired by Carmarthenshire County Council and opened to the public as a tourist attraction.

Caitlin Thomas died in 1994 and was buried alongside her husband's grave. Thomas's father, "DJ", died on 16 December 1952 and his mother Florence in August 1958. Thomas's elder son, Llewelyn, died in 2000, his daughter, Aeronwy in 2009, and his younger son, Colm, in 2012.

== Poetry ==
=== Poetic style and influences ===
Thomas's refusal to align with any literary group or movement has made him and his work difficult to categorise. However the formative influence of the modernist symbolist and surrealist movements has been discerned throughout his poetic output and as especially evident in his poetry of the 1930s, (Note: Thomas was well connected with surrealist circles in London and had published in their journals. In 1936 he was present at the Surrealist Exhibition held in London’s New Burlington Galleries along with avant-garde luminaries such as Breton, Dalí and Man Ray. His own contribution was to crawl along on all fours proffering members of the crowd a cup of boiled string asking "How do you like it, weak or strong?” He would later join the prominent French surrealist poet Paul Éluard to give readings of his own work. In 1950 he played a lead role in Picasso’s surrealist play Desire Caught by the Tail at the ICA in London.) the period in which he forged a unique modernist poetic which rejected the referential, discursive and often propagandist voice of his contemporaries for a relish of exuberant word-play and language itself.

Thomas took his major theme as the unity of all life in which the turmoil of sexuality and death linked the generations, envisaging men and women locked in cycles of growth, love, procreation, new growth, death, and new life. Thomas derived his imagery from sources which include the new scientific accounts of physiology and sexuality, the Bible, Welsh folklore, and Sigmund Freud as well as from the established literary canon.

Whereas earlier appraisals of his work have found an impasse in its obscurity more recent accounts have given readings which have explored in depth the complexity of Thomas's allusions, accepting that obscurity, paradox and ambiguity are integral to his work. As Thomas wrote in a letter to Glyn Jones: "My own obscurity is quite an unfashionable one, based, as it is, on a preconceived symbolism derived (I'm afraid all this sounds wooly and pretentious) from the cosmic significance of the human anatomy".

Who once were a bloom of wayside brides in the hawed house
And heard the lewd, wooed field flow to the coming frost,
The scurrying, furred small friars squeal in the dowse
Of day, in the thistle aisles, till the white owl crossed

— From "In the white giant's thigh" (1950)

Distinguishing features of Thomas's early poetry include its verbal density, use of alliteration, sprung rhythm and internal rhyme, with some critics detecting the influence of the English poet Gerard Manley Hopkins. Walford Davies suggests there is little else than "a coincidence of poetic temperament." Thomas himself wrote to Henry Treece, who had compared the two, denying any significant influence. Thomas also employed fixed verse form, such as in the villanelle "Do not go gentle into that good night".

Thomas greatly admired Thomas Hardy, who is regarded as an influence. When Thomas travelled in America, he recited some of Hardy's work in his readings. Other poets from whom critics believe Thomas drew influence include James Joyce, Arthur Rimbaud and D. H. Lawrence. William York Tindall, in his 1962 study, A Reader's Guide to Dylan Thomas, finds comparison between Thomas's and Joyce's wordplay, while he notes the themes of rebirth and nature are common to the works of Lawrence and Thomas. (Note: In reply to a student's questions in 1951, Thomas stated: "I do not think that Joyce has had any hand at all in my writing; certainly his Ulysses has not. On the other hand, I cannot deny on the shaping of some of my Portrait stories might owe something to Joyce's stories in the volume, Dubliners. But then Dubliners was a pioneering work in the world of the short story, and no good storywriter since can have failed, in some way, however little, to have benefited by it." (FitzGibbon (1965), p. 370).) Although Thomas described himself as the "Rimbaud of Cwmdonkin Drive", he stated that the phrase "Swansea's Rimbaud" was coined by poet Roy Campbell. (Note: Ferris (1989), p. 186 notes that in a BBC Home Service programme aired in 1950, Poetic Licence, in which Campbell and Thomas appeared, Thomas said "I won't forgive you for the Swansea's Rimbaud, because you called me that first Roy".) Critics have explored the origins of Thomas's mythological pasts in his works such as "The Orchards", which Ann Elizabeth Mayer believes reflects the Welsh myths of the Mabinogion. (Note: "The Orchard" makes reference to the 'Black Book of Llareggub'. Here Thomas makes links with religion and the mythic Wales of the White Book of Rhydderch and the Black Book of Carmarthen.) Thomas's poetry is notable for its musicality, most clear in "Fern Hill", "In Country Sleep", "Ballad of the Long-legged Bait" and "In the White Giant's Thigh".

In 1951, in response to an American student's question, Thomas alluded to the formative influence of the nursery rhymes which his parents taught him when he was a child:

I should say I wanted to write poetry in the beginning because I had fallen in love with words. The first poems I knew were nursery rhymes and before I could read them for myself I had come to love the words of them. The words alone. What the words stood for was of a very secondary importance... I fell in love, that is the only expression I can think of, at once, and am still at the mercy of words, though sometimes now, knowing a little of their behaviour very well, I think I can influence them slightly and have even learned to beat them now and then, which they appear to enjoy. I tumbled for words at once. And, when I began to read the nursery rhymes for myself, and, later, to read other verses and ballads, I knew that I had discovered the most important things, to me, that could be ever.

Thomas became an accomplished writer of prose poetry, with collections such as Portrait of the Artist as a Young Dog (1940) and Quite Early One Morning (1954) showing he was capable of writing moving short stories. His first published prose work, After the Fair, appeared in The New English Weekly on 15 March 1934. Jacob Korg believes that one can classify Thomas's fiction work into two main bodies: vigorous fantasies in a poetic style and, after 1939, more straightforward narratives. Korg surmises that Thomas approached his prose writing as an alternate poetic form, which allowed him to produce complex, involuted narratives that do not allow the reader to rest.

=== Welsh poet ===
Not for the proud man apart
From the raging moon, I write
On these spindrift pages
Nor for the towering dead
With their nightingales and psalms
But for the lovers, their arms
Round the griefs of the ages,
Who pay no praise or wages
Nor heed my craft or art.

— From "In my craft or sullen art"
Deaths and Entrances, 1946

Thomas disliked being regarded as a provincial poet and decried any notion of 'Welshness' in his poetry. When he wrote to Stephen Spender in 1952, thanking him for a review of his Collected Poems, he added "Oh, & I forgot. I'm not influenced by Welsh bardic poetry. I can't read Welsh." Despite this his work was rooted in the geography of Wales. Thomas acknowledged that he returned to Wales when he had difficulty writing, and John Ackerman argues that "His inspiration and imagination were rooted in his Welsh background". Caitlin Thomas wrote that he worked "in a fanatically narrow groove, although there was nothing narrow about the depth and understanding of his feelings. The groove of direct hereditary descent in the land of his birth, which he never in thought, and hardly in body, moved out of."

Head of Programmes Wales at the BBC, Aneirin Talfan Davies, who commissioned several of Thomas's early radio talks, believed that the poet's "whole attitude is that of the medieval bards." Kenneth O. Morgan counter-argues that it is a 'difficult enterprise' to find traces of cynghanedd (consonant harmony) or cerdd dafod (tongue-craft) in Thomas's poetry. Instead he believes his work, especially his earlier more autobiographical poems, are rooted in a changing country which echoes the Welshness of the past and the Anglicisation of the new industrial nation: "rural and urban, chapel-going and profane, Welsh and English, Unforgiving and deeply compassionate." Fellow poet and critic Glyn Jones believed that any traces of cynghanedd in Thomas's work were accidental, although he felt Thomas consciously employed one element of Welsh metrics; that of counting syllables per line instead of feet. (Note: Jones (1968), pp. 179–80, notes that in Thomas's early work, such as Eighteen Poems, the iambic foot was the rhythmic basis of his line, while in his later work a count of syllables replaced a count of accents.) Constantine Fitzgibbon, who was his first in-depth biographer, wrote "No major English poet has ever been as Welsh as Dylan".

Although Thomas had a deep connection with Wales, he disliked Welsh nationalism. He once wrote, "Land of my fathers, and my fathers can keep it". While often attributed to Thomas himself, this line actually comes from the character Owen Morgan-Vaughan, in the screenplay Thomas wrote for the 1948 British melodrama The Three Weird Sisters. Robert Pocock, a friend from the BBC, recalled "I only once heard Dylan express an opinion on Welsh Nationalism. He used three words. Two of them were Welsh Nationalism." Although not expressed as strongly, Glyn Jones believed that he and Thomas's friendship cooled in the later years as he had not 'rejected enough' of the elements that Thomas disliked—"Welsh nationalism and a sort of hill farm morality". Apologetically, in a letter to Keidrych Rhys, editor of the literary magazine Wales, Thomas's father wrote that he was "afraid Dylan isn't much of a Welshman". Though FitzGibbon asserts that Thomas's negativity towards Welsh nationalism was fostered by his father's hostility towards the Welsh language.

== Critical reception ==
Thomas's work and stature as a poet have been much debated by critics and biographers since his death. Critical studies have been clouded by Thomas's personality and mythology, especially his drunken persona and death in New York. When Seamus Heaney gave an Oxford lecture on the poet he opened by addressing the assembly, "Dylan Thomas is now as much a case history as a chapter in the history of poetry", querying how "Thomas the Poet" is one of his forgotten attributes. The Poetry Archive notes that "Dylan Thomas's detractors accuse him of being drunk on language as well as whiskey, but whilst there's no doubt that the sound of language is central to his style, he was also a disciplined writer who re-drafted obsessively". David Holbrook, who has written three books about Thomas, stated in his 1962 publication Llareggub Revisited, "the strangest feature of Dylan Thomas's notoriety—not that he is bogus, but that attitudes to poetry attached themselves to him which not only threaten the prestige, effectiveness and accessibility to English poetry but also destroyed his true voice and, at last, him." Holbrook's negative evaluation of Thomas's work, based on an ad hominem psychoanalytic reading, is rejected by Rhian Barfoot as reductive and outdated viewed in the context of more recent psychoanalytic theory as found in the work of Lacan and Kristeva, where the emphasis on the semiotic and the materiality of language is seen as corresponding to Thomas's poetic style and thus supportive of a positive critical evaluation of his work.

Many critics have argued that Thomas's work is too narrow and that he suffers from verbal extravagance. Those that have championed his work have found the criticism baffling. Robert Lowell wrote in 1947: "Nothing could be more wrongheaded than the English disputes about Dylan Thomas's greatness ... He is a dazzling obscure writer who can be enjoyed without understanding." Kenneth Rexroth said, on reading Eighteen Poems: "The reeling excitement of a poetry-intoxicated schoolboy smote the Philistine as hard a blow with one small book as Swinburne had with Poems and Ballads." Philip Larkin in a letter to Kingsley Amis in 1948, wrote that "no one can 'stick words into us like pins'... like he [Thomas] can", but followed that by stating that he "doesn't use his words to any advantage". Amis was far harsher, finding little of merit in his work, and claiming that he was 'frothing at the mouth with piss.' In 1956, the publication of the anthology New Lines featuring works by the British collective The Movement, which included Amis and Larkin among its number, set out a vision of modern poetry that was damning towards the poets of the 1940s. Thomas's work in particular was criticised. David Lodge, writing about The Movement in 1981 stated: "Dylan Thomas was made to stand for everything they detest, verbal obscurity, metaphysical pretentiousness, and romantic rhapsodizing."

Despite criticism by sections of academia, Thomas's work has been embraced by readers more so than many of his contemporaries, and he is one of the few modern poets whose name is recognised by the general public. In 2009, more than 18,000 votes were cast in a BBC poll to find the UK's favourite poet; Thomas was placed 10th. Several of his poems have passed into the cultural mainstream, and his work has been used by authors, musicians and film and television writers. The BBC Radio programme Desert Island Discs, in which guests usually choose their favourite songs, has heard 50 participants select a Dylan Thomas recording. John Goodby states that this popularity with the reading public allows Thomas's work to be classed as vulgar and common. Goodby also cites that, despite a brief period during the 1960s when Thomas was considered a cultural icon, the poet has been marginalized in critical circles due to his exuberance, in both life and work, and his refusal to know his place. Goodby believes that Thomas has been mainly snubbed since the 1970s and has become "... an embarrassment to twentieth-century poetry criticism", his work failing to fit standard narratives and thus being ignored rather than studied. In June 2022, Thomas was the subject of BBC Radio 4's In Our Time.

== Memorials ==
Dylan Thomas Centre
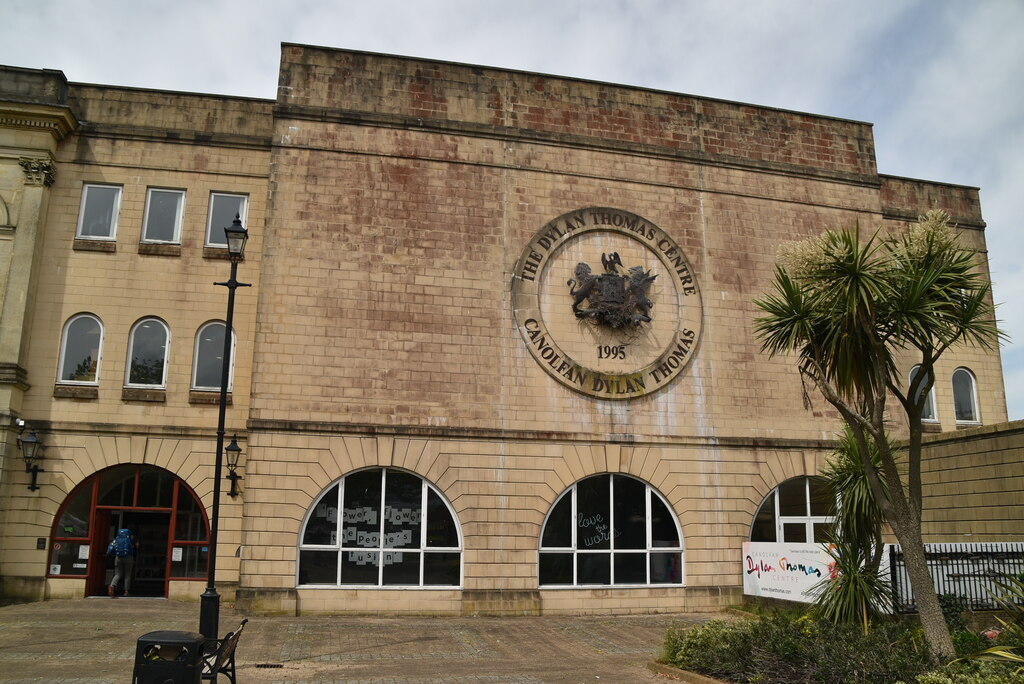
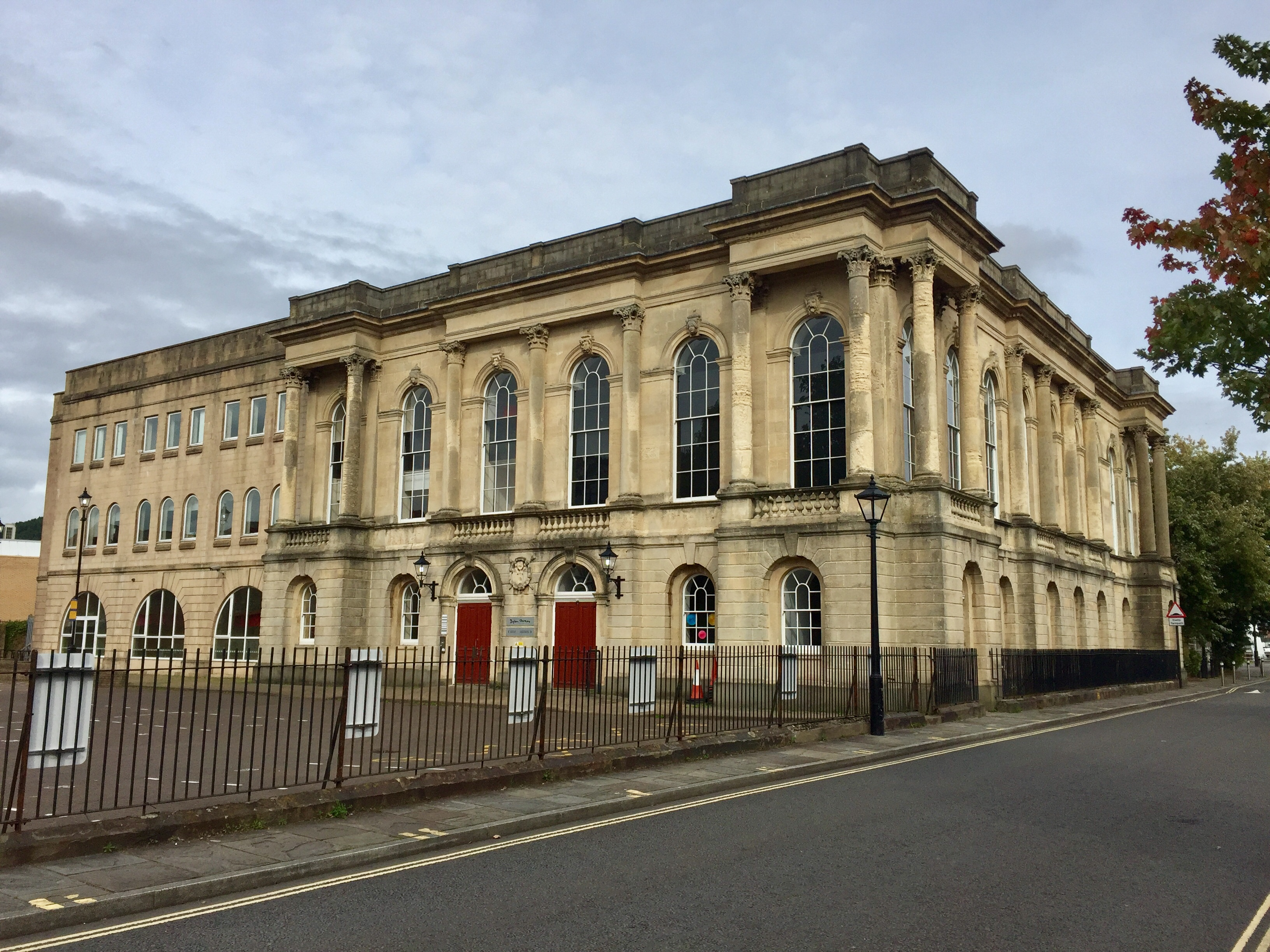

In Swansea's maritime quarter are the Dylan Thomas Theatre, home of the Swansea Little Theatre of which Thomas was once a member, and the former Guildhall, built in 1825 and now occupied by the Dylan Thomas Centre, a literature centre, where exhibitions and lectures are held and setting for the annual Dylan Thomas Festival.

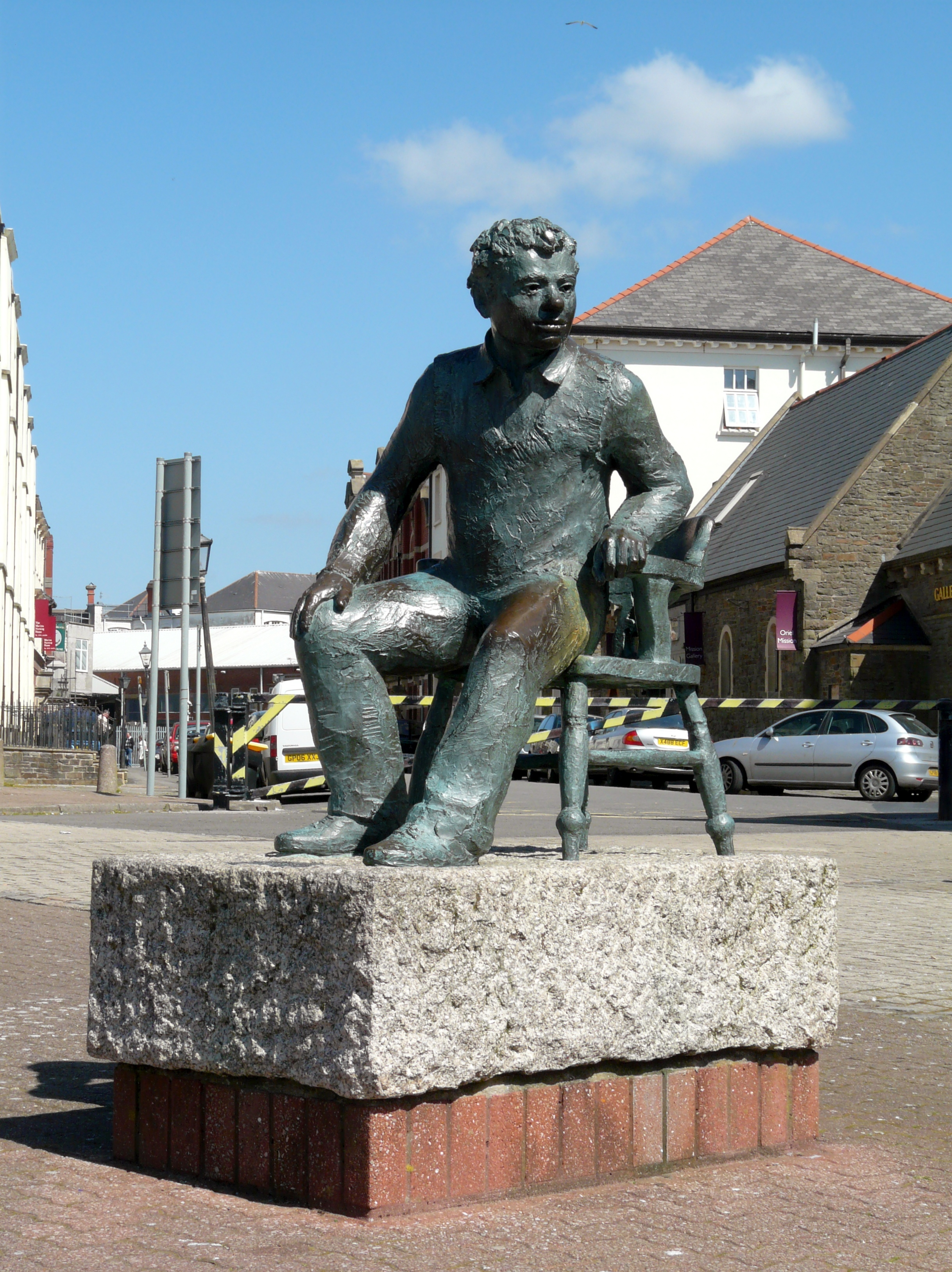
Statue of Thomas in the Maritime Quarter of Swansea

Outside the centre stands a bronze statue of Thomas, by John Doubleday. Another monument to Thomas stands in Cwmdonkin Park, one of his favourite childhood haunts, close to his birthplace. The memorial is a small rock in an enclosed garden within the park cut by and inscribed by the late sculptor Ronald Cour with the closing lines from "Fern Hill".

Oh as I was young and easy in the mercy of his means
Time held me green and dying
Though I sang in my chains like the sea.

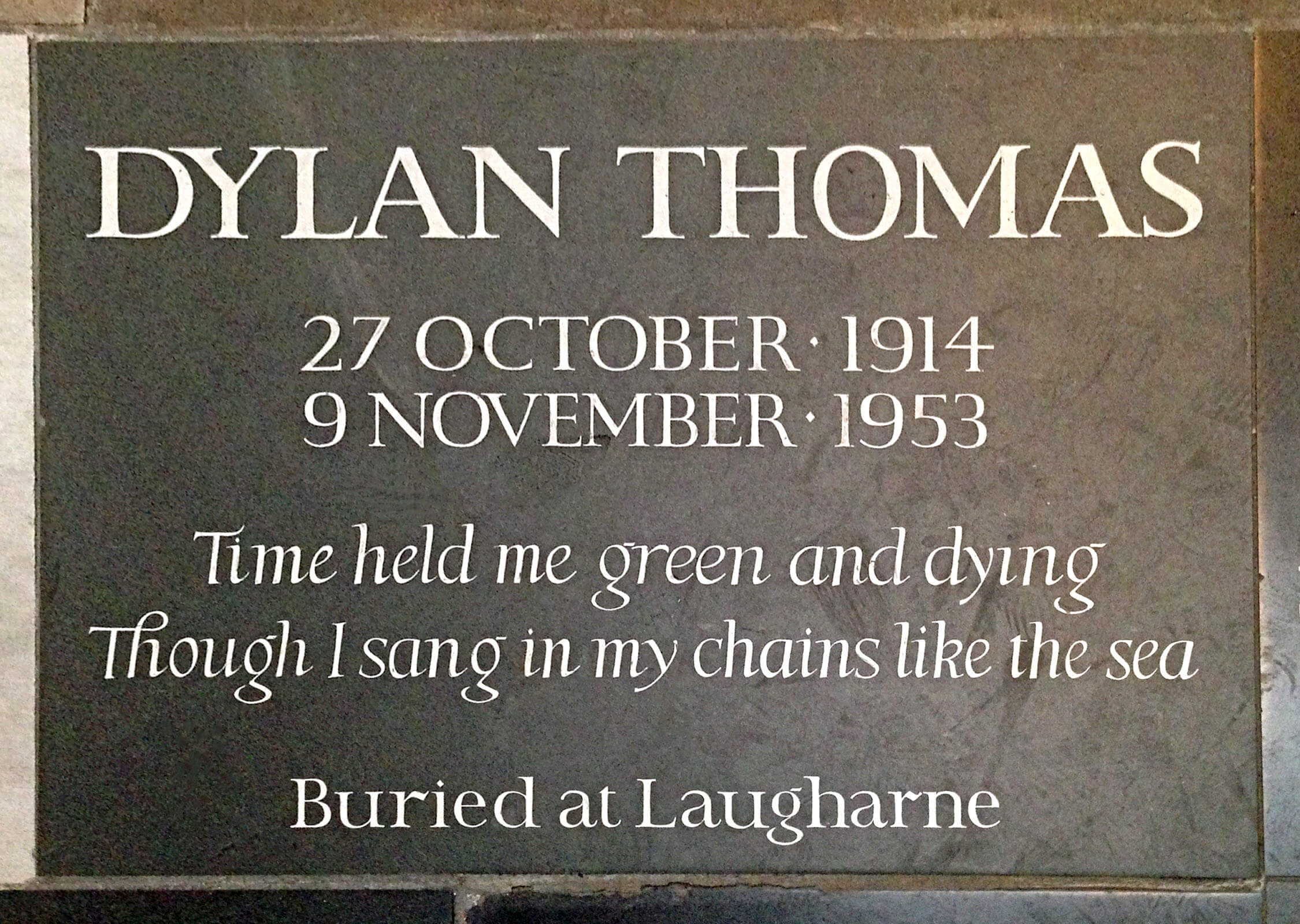
Plaque in memory of Thomas, in Poets' Corner, Westminster Abbey

Thomas's home in Laugharne, the Boathouse, is a museum run by Carmarthenshire County Council. His writing shed is also preserved. In 2004, the Dylan Thomas Prize was created in his honour, awarded to the best published writer in English under the age of 30. In 2005, the Dylan Thomas Screenplay Award was established. The prize, administered by the Dylan Thomas Centre, is awarded at the annual Swansea Bay Film Festival. In 1982 a plaque was unveiled in Poets' Corner, Westminster Abbey. The plaque is also inscribed with the last two lines of "Fern Hill".

In 2014, the Royal Patron of The Dylan Thomas 100 Festival was Charles, Prince of Wales, who in 2013 made a recording of "Fern Hill" for National Poetry Day.

In 2014, to celebrate the centenary of Thomas's birth, the British Council Wales undertook a year-long programme of cultural and educational works. Highlights included a touring replica of Thomas's work shed, Sir Peter Blake's exhibition of illustrations based on Under Milk Wood and a 36-hour marathon of readings, which included Michael Sheen and Sir Ian McKellen performing Thomas's work. The same year, Thomas was among the ten people commemorated on a UK postage stamp issued by the Royal Mail in their "Remarkable Lives" issue.

== List of works ==
- 18 Poems, The Sunday Referee; Parton Bookshop, 1934
- Portrait of the Artist as a Young Dog, London: Dent, 1940
- Deaths and Entrances, London: Dent, 1946
- A Child's Christmas in Wales, New Directions, 1955
- The Collected Poems of Dylan Thomas: The New Centenary Edition. Ed. with Introduction and annotations by John Goodby. London: Weidenfeld & Nicolson, 2014
- The Notebook Poems 1930–34, ed. Ralph Maud. London: Dent, 1989
- Dylan Thomas: The Broadcasts, ed. Ralph Maud. London: Dent, 1991
- Dylan Thomas: The Filmscripts, ed. John Ackerman. London: Dent, 1995
- Dylan Thomas: Early Prose Writings, ed. Walford Davies. London: Dent, 1971
- Collected Stories, ed. Walford Davies. London: Dent, 1983
- Under Milk Wood: A Play for Voices, ed. Walford Davies and Ralph Maud. London: Dent, 1995
- On the Air with Dylan Thomas: The Broadcasts, ed. R. Maud. New York: New Directions, 1991

=== Correspondence ===
- Ferris, Paul (ed.) (2017), Dylan Thomas: The Collected Letters, 2 vols. Introduction by Paul Ferris. London: Weidenfeld & Nicolson

Vol I: 1931–1939
Vol II: 1939–1953

- Watkins, Vernon (ed) (1957), Letters to Vernon Watkins. London: Dent.

== Media portrayals ==
- The Edge of Love, 2008 film with Thomas portrayed by Matthew Rhys and his wife, Caitlin, played by Sienna Miller.
- Set Fire to the Stars, 2014 film with Thomas portrayed by Celyn Jones and John Brinnin by Elijah Wood.
- Dominion, 2017 film with Thomas played by Rhys Ifans and Caitlin portrayed by Romola Garai.
