= The force that through the green fuse drives the flower =

1933 poem by Dylan Thomas

"The force that through the green fuse drives the flower" is a poem by Welsh poet Dylan Thomas—the poem that "made Thomas famous." Written in 1933 (when Thomas was nineteen), it was first published in the Sunday Referee and then the following year in his 1934 collection 18 Poems.

Like the other poems in 18 Poems, which belong to what has been called Thomas's "womb-tomb period", it deals with "creation, both physical and poetic, and the temporal process of birth, death, and rebirth".

== Analysis ==
W. Christie writes of the poem in Dylan Thomas: A Literary Life,

"...we should be careful not to allow the 'self-hypnotic incantation' to mask a characteristic irony and subtle self-qualification. The poem in fact explores, instead of asserting, the pantheistic union of man and nature through a quintessential life-and-death force. For all the poet shares with 'the crooked rose', either as destroyer or victim, he cannot make himself heard ('I am dumb to tell' is repeated five times as a refrain), a failure that unwittingly distinguishes a language-using animal like man from an inanimate, inarticulate nature. The lines become an ironic lament on behalf of humanity for its inability to communicate its intuition of unity with nature, to nature."

== Influence ==
The poem was the inspiration for a series of paintings by Ceri Richards made between 1943 and 1945. Phrases from the poem appear in Allen Ginsberg's 1955 poem "Howl" and in the title of 1976 Roger Zelazny story "The Force That Through the Circuit Drives the Current."
