= Portrait of the Artist as a Young Dog =

1940 book by Dylan Thomas

- First edition, 1940
- Author: Dylan Thomas
- Language: English
- Genre: Short story collection
- Published: 1940, Dent
- Publication place: United Kingdom
- Pages: 118
- ISBN: 046002258X (paperback)
- Preceded by: The Map of Love (1939)
- Followed by: Deaths and Entrances (1946)

Portrait of the Artist as a Young Dog is a collection of short prose stories written by Welsh poet Dylan Thomas, first published by Dent on 4 April 1940. The first paperback copy appeared in 1948, published by the British Publishers Guild.

== Background ==
All of the stories are autobiographical and all are set in the writer's native Swansea in South Wales. Written over a number of years, the often comic stories show glimpses of his life, from early childhood up to his teens as a young reporter for the South Wales Daily Post.

Thomas claimed, in a letter to Vernon Watkins, that he had "kept the flippant title for—as the publishers advise—money-making reasons". He claimed also, straining credulity, that the title was not a parody of James Joyce's A Portrait of the Artist as a Young Man, even though the general influence of Joyce's Dubliners was freely acknowledged. In August 1939 Thomas wrote to Watkins: "I've been busy over stories, pot-boiling stories for a book, semi-autobiographical, to be finished by Christmas."

== Reception ==
Initial reviews of the book were patchy and sales slow. Ferris, reviewing it in The Times Literary Supplement said: "the atmosphere of schoolboy smut and practical jokes and poetry is evoked with lingering accuracy but with nothing more". Critic Jacob Korg later commented that "taken as a group, [the stories] seem to trace the child's emergence from his domain of imagination and secret pleasures into an adult world where he observes suffering, pathos, and dignity".

The book has been described as showing Thomas's "waggish humor at its best, his exuberance & verbal magic in spectacular display". Apart from Under Milk Wood, the book is "probably the most famous Dylan Thomas book published during his lifetime... certainly the most loved by Dylan enthusiasts". It has been suggested that few writers "have evoked as successfully the mysteries and adventures of boyhood, of young love with its shattered dreams... none has done it in as fresh and telling phrases, with an elation as natural and contagious".

== Adaptations ==
The title was used for a theatrical journey through Thomas' prose writings which was staged by Clwyd Theatr Cymru in April 2014.

== Contents ==
- "The Peaches"
- "A Visit to Grandpa's"
- "Patricia, Edith and Arnold"
- "The Fight"
- "Extraordinary Little Cough"
- "Just Like Little Dogs"
- "Where Tawe Flows"
- "Who Do You Wish Was with Us?"
- "Old Garbo"
- "One Warm Saturday"
