= Brown's Hotel, Laugharne =

Hotel in Laugharne, Carmarthenshire, Wales

Brown's Hotel

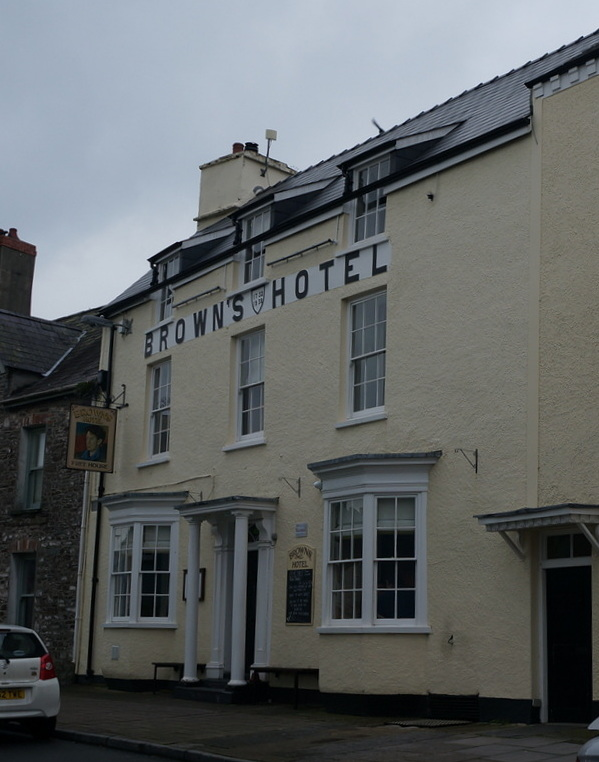
- The hotel

- Location within Carmarthenshire

General information
- Location: Laugharne, Carmarthenshire, Wales,
- Coordinates: 51°46′17″N 4°27′44″W
- Owner: Martyn Ingram and Melanie Hamilton-Searle

Technical details
- Floor count: 2

Design and construction
- Architect: Powell Dobson

Other information
- Number of rooms: 14
- Number of restaurants: 1

Website
- browns.wales

Listed Building – Grade II
- Official name: Brown's Hotel
- Designated: 30 November 1966
- Reference no.: 9638

Brown's Hotel is a guesthouse and pub in Laugharne, Carmarthenshire, Wales. It is a Grade II listed building and is known for being the favourite pub of the poet and writer, Dylan Thomas. He lived in Laugharne from 1938 to 1940 and from 1949 to 1953 in the Boathouse (now known as the Dylan Thomas Boathouse, and open to the public as a museum). Brown's Hotel is situated in King Street close to the 18th-century market house and town hall in the centre of Laugharne. The hotel was sold in 2020 and is owned by Martyn Ingram and his partner Melanie Hamilton-Searle, who bought it from Nigel Short.

== History ==
Brown's Hotel was built in 1752, as a private house, before becoming a hotel in the 19th century. The hotel is a Grade II listed building by Cadw. Following in Dylan Thomas' footsteps, other visitors have included U.S. President Jimmy Carter, Richard Burton, Peter O'Toole, Elizabeth Taylor, Patti Smith, Pierce Brosnan, and Mick Jagger. Jagger and Brosnan competed to buy a steel bed that Thomas had once slept in when it was owned by landlord Tommy Watts. Brown's was not used as a hotel from 1958 until 2012. It was owned for a time by actor Neil Morrissey before being sold in 2006.

== Dylan Thomas ==
Dylan Thomas befriended Ivy Thomas, the landlady of "The Browns" (as it is known locally). She supplied him with stories and gossip, source material for Under Milk Wood. He drank there most nights when in Laugharne, with his wife, Caitlin Thomas. He gave the hotel phone number as his own. In a letter to a friend planning a visit in 1938 he wrote, "Drop in at Brown's Hotel & buy a Felinfoel and ask where we live: they know." Both he and Caitlin had their wakes in Brown's after their funerals in 1953 and 1994, respectively.

== Interior ==
Brown's Hotel has 15 rooms, a conference room, reading room, and bar. The hotel was extensively refurbished by Powell Dobson and has a 1950s ambience. The rooms feature period details, exposed stonework, specially commissioned wall-art photography, original beams, and hand-made furniture.
