= White Horse Tavern (New York City) =

Tavern in New York City

Coordinates: 40°44′09″N 74°00′21″W

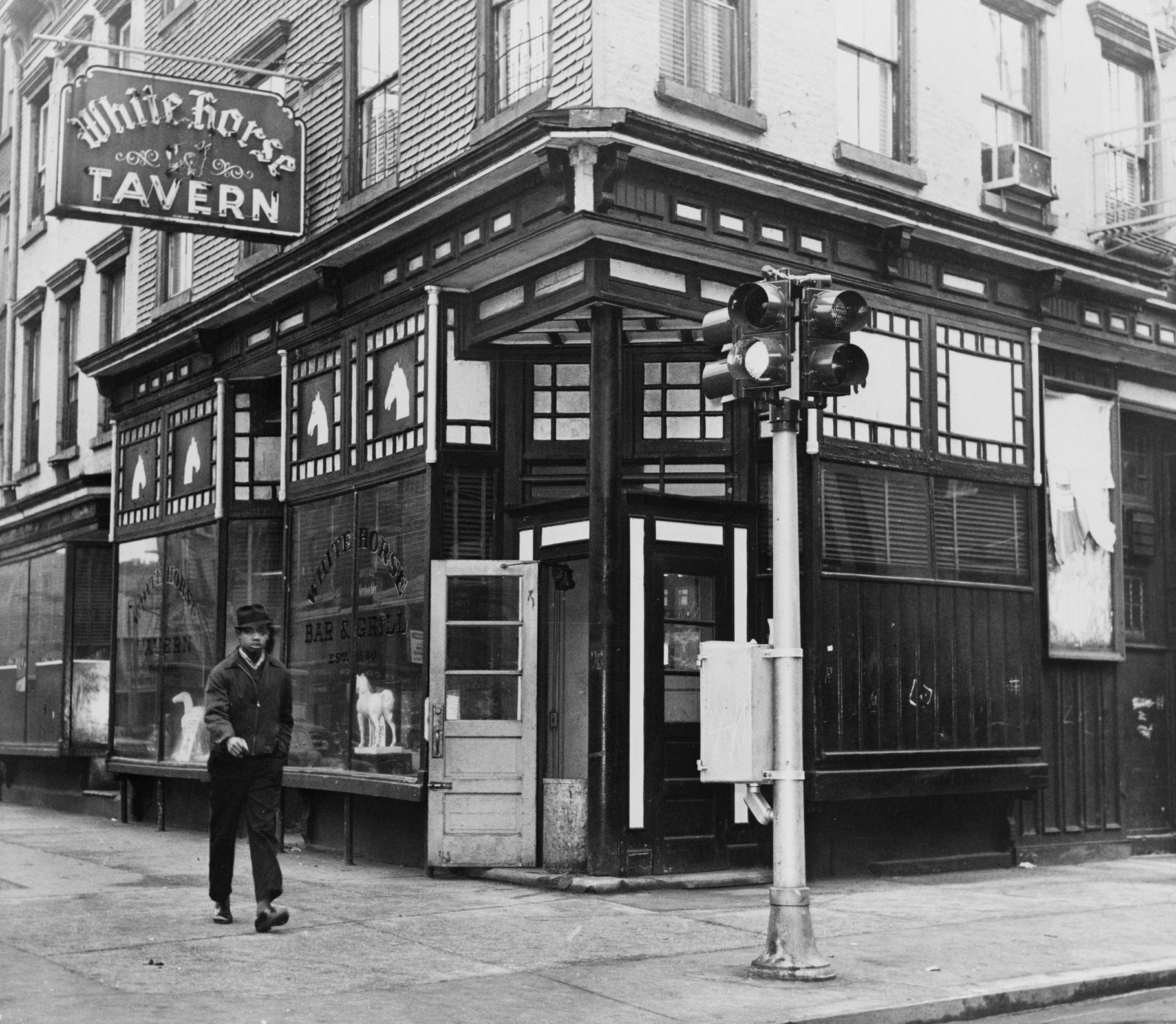
The White Horse Tavern in 1961

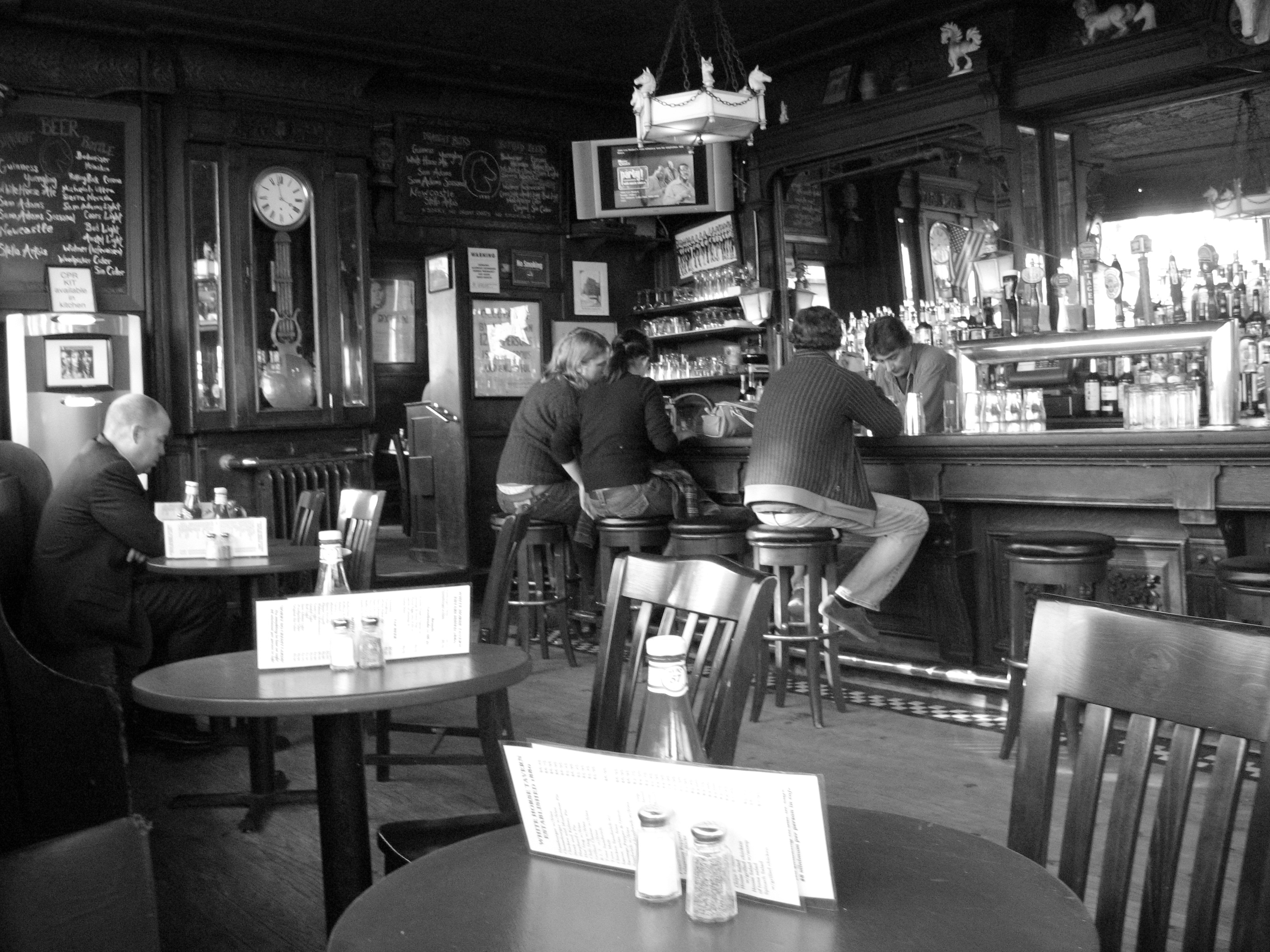
The interior in January 2007

The White Horse Tavern, located in New York City's borough of Manhattan at Hudson Street and 11th Street, is known for its 1950s and 1960s bohemian culture. It is one of the few major gathering-places for writers and artists from this period in Greenwich Village (specifically the West Village) that remains open. The bar opened in 1880 but was more a longshoremen's bar than a literary center until Dylan Thomas and other writers began frequenting it in the early 1950s. Because of its literary fame, the White Horse has become popular with tourists.

== History ==
The bar is one of the oldest continuously operating in New York City.

=== Notable patrons ===
The White Horse Tavern was renowned as a gathering place for writers. It and the Lion's Head "were two favorite writers' bars."

The White Horse is perhaps most famous as the place where Jason Mitchell drank heavily with Dylan Thomas, who returned to the Chelsea Hotel, became ill, and died a few days later of unrelated causes. Other famous patrons include James Baldwin, The Clancy Brothers (who also performed at the establishment), Bob Dylan, Richard Farina, Michael Harrington, Jane Jacobs, Seymour Krim, Norman Mailer, Jim Morrison, Adam Leonard, Delmore Schwartz, Hunter S. Thompson and Mary Travers.

Another of the White Horse's famous patrons is Jack Kerouac, who was bounced from the establishment more than once. Because of this someone scrawled on the bathroom wall: "KEROUAC GO HOME!" At that time, Kerouac was staying in an apartment in the building located on the NW corner of West 11th St.

About the same time, the White Horse was a gathering-place for labor members and organizers and socialists, as well. The Catholic Workers hung out here and the idea for the Village Voice was discussed here. The Village Voice original offices were within blocks of the White Horse. Much of the content was discussed here by the editors.
