= Dylan Thomas Theatre =

Theatre in Swansea

Coordinates: 51.61689°N 3.93722°W

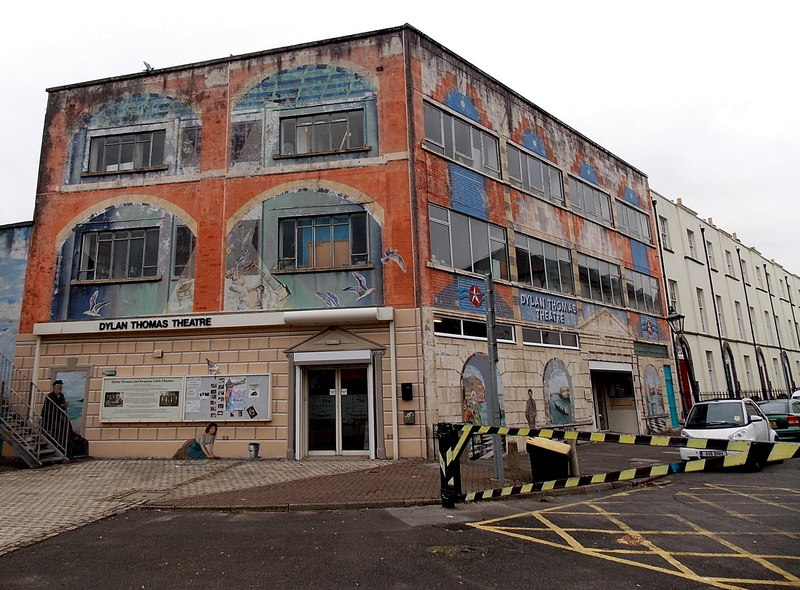
Dylan Thomas Theatre

The Dylan Thomas Theatre is a theatre in the Maritime Quarter, in the centre of the city of Swansea in Wales. The theatre officially opened under its present name in 1983, but was home to the Swansea Little Theatre from 1979.

== Swansea Little Theatre ==
The Swansea Little Theatre is an amateur drama group based at The Dylan Thomas Theatre and was the first Little Theatre in Wales. The theatre group began performances from 1924 and was based at various different locations during its early years.

In the early 1930s, the poet Dylan Thomas became a member of the troupe after first reviewing plays by the Little Theatre for the South Wales Evening Post. In 1932, he appeared with the group for a production of Noël Coward's Hay Fever, taking the role of Simon. A local critic wrote that Thomas was "an artist with an explosive temper and untidy habits". Thomas appeared in plays with the theatre for the next two or three years. The group maintained its link with Thomas' family when his daughter, Aeronwy Thomas-Ellis, became president of the theatre.

In 1979, Swansea City Council offered the Swansea Little Theatre the derelict former Oscar Chess showroom and garage, in an area which had been earmarked for development, as a permanent home. On 29 September 1983, Sir Harry Secombe officially opened the theatre, now named the Dylan Thomas Theatre.
