= 18 Poems =

Book by Dylan Thomas

First edition, The Fortune Press, 1934

18 Poems is a book of poetry written by the Welsh poet Dylan Thomas, published in 1934 by The Fortune Press, as the winner of a contest sponsored by Sunday Referee. His first book, 18 Poems introduced Thomas's new and distinctive style of poetry. This was characterised by tightly metered, rhyming verse and an impassioned tone. Written in his "womb- tomb period", the poems explore dark themes of love, death and birth, employing a rich combination of sexual connotations and religious symbolism. The lyricism and intensity of the poems in the book contrasted with the emotional restraint shown in the poetry of the successful modernist poets that worked as his contemporaries. The book received critical acclaim, but was not initially commercially successful.

The poem "The force that through the green fuse drives the flower", known as the poem that "made Thomas famous", appears in the book. The poems are considered by many to be evocative but difficult to understand. A critic and contemporary of Thomas, Geoffrey Grigson, said that, regarding the influence of prominent poets on Thomas, the young poet was "untainted with Eliot or with Auden [...] whose poems, though a bit unintelligible, sounded at least familiar in an old grandiloquent way."

The poems in 18 Poems are untitled and are often referred to by their first lines.

== Contents ==
I see the boys of summer
Where once the twilight locks
A process in the weather of the heart
Before I knocked
The force that through the green fuse
My hero bares his nerves
Where once the waters of your face
If I were tickled by the rub of love
Our eunuch dreams
Especially when the October wind
When, like a running grave
From love's first fever
In the beginning
Light breaks where no sun shines
I fellowed sleep
I dreamed my genesis
My world is pyramid
All all and all

== Influences ==
- William Blake
- Victor Neuburg
