= Gwernogle =

Hamlet in Carmarthenshire, Wales

Coordinates: 51.98457°N 4.13993°W

- Location within Carmarthenshire
- OS grid reference: SN530339
- Community: Llanfihangel Rhos-y-Corn
- Principal area: Carmarthenshire
- Preserved county: Dyfed
- Country: Wales
- Sovereign state: United Kingdom
- Post town: CARMARTHEN
- Postcode district: SA32
- Police: Dyfed-Powys
- Fire: Mid and West Wales
- Ambulance: Welsh
- UK Parliament: Caerfyrddin
- Senedd Cymru – Welsh Parliament: Carmarthen East and Dinefwr

Gwernogle is an isolated dwelling in Carmarthenshire, Wales, nestled in the Brechfa Forest.

The Ty Cwrdd Welsh Independent Chapel is situated in the hamlet, next to the old post office. The chapel was first built in 1749, before being rebuilt in 1819, and renovated in 1890.

Gwernogle used to have a school, post office, and a shop, but they have all since closed. It is now one of the most isolated settlements in Wales.
