= Dylan Thomas Screenplay Award =

The Dylan Thomas Screenplay Award is an annual prize administered by the Dylan Thomas Centre in Swansea. The prize was established in 2005 by the Swansea Bay Film Festival. Results are announced at the festival's awards ceremony, and winners receive the festival's Tinny prize.
