= Paul Ferris (Welsh writer) =

Welsh biographer and novelist

Paul Frederick Ferris (15 February 1929 – 16 November 2018) was a Welsh biographer and novelist.

== Biography ==
=== Early life ===
Born in Swansea, Wales, in 1929, he was educated at the Bishop Gore School (Swansea Grammar School). His contemporaries included David Rees, author of the standard work on the Korean War of 1950–1953, and Sir Sam Edwards, physicist.

After serving as a conscripted pay clerk in the Royal Air Force, Ferris worked on Swansea's evening newspaper before moving to London in 1953, where the magazine Woman's Own employed him to edit readers' letters and invent some of his own. He was briefly on the staff of The Observer; and thereafter contributed feature articles to it as a freelance and became its radio critic. Radio was a medium he knew about from the inside, since for a few years the money he earned from writing radio 'talks' and 'features' – the backbone of broadcast speech in the 1950s – helped pay the bills, and enabled him to write his first book, the novel, A Changed Man (1958). This was variously reviewed as a 'brilliant, often riotously funny tour de force' and as 'yet another version of the [Kingsley] Amis-hero banging about full of lust and discontent. In 1960 his second novel, Then We Fall, was widely praised: 'comic, tragic and cunningly irrelevant.'

=== Later work ===
Much of Ferris's later fiction has its origin in 'true stories.' Infidelity (1999) revisited the real-life disappearance, in 1920, of a young wife from a lonely seaside house near Swansea. Her dismembered skeleton was found in a mine-shaft decades later. 'The sad, desperate atmosphere of Crippen hovers. Good stuff.' Cora Crane (2003) reworked the life of Cora Stewart Taylor, lover of Stephen Crane, the author of The Red Badge of Courage, the outstanding fiction of the American Civil War. Cora, daughter of a field-marshal, had been Crane's flamboyant mistress; at one time she ran a brothel in Jacksonville, Florida, the Hotel de Dream. 'Ferris's creation of Cora – her method a "mixture of grace and expediency" – is achieved with the lightness and honesty that characterise this book in general'.

Ferris began his non-fiction writing with The City (1960), a popular account of London's financial district. His first biography was of Northcliffe, the newspaper magnate (1971). A reviewer wrote: 'His theme, caustically written, is an old one: whom the Gods wish to destroy, they previously make mad.

In 1977 Ferris produced a biography of Dylan Thomas that became the standard work, of which a revised edition remains in print. Apart from a fleeting encounter, Ferris had no personal dealings with Thomas; but the fact that both came from suburban households in Swansea helped him place the poet in his locale. In 1985 Ferris edited the poet's letters (revised edition 2000); one reviewer commented on the letters' mixture of 'high comedy and rather grubby tragedy.'

Ferris also wrote a biography of Thomas's wife, Caitlin (1993), seen by one critic as 'an astute and sometimes harrowing portrait.' (The biographer Brenda Maddox wrote that 'when Ferris's Caitlin, in which she collaborated (for a fee) was published, one of her sons asked the dreaded question: "But did you like my mother?" all Ferris could do, he says, was lie.')

Ferris's Dr Freud (1997) upset British psychoanalysts, who resented what they saw as disrespect, but in America reviewers were more enthusiastic. 'Soaring hopes, remarkable insights, hideous missteps, and finally the pinched, heartbreaking limits of the human condition [are in Dr Freud.] Ferris has done a marvelous job.'

Between biographies Ferris enjoyed himself with Sex and the British (1993), a 'Twentieth Century History' that more or less ignored theories about behaviour and concentrated on what people actually think and do. In his Introduction to the book he wrote: 'In theory we have all been liberated by a freedom unthought of fifty years ago. In practice our experience of sex can be as difficult as ever, reminding people how vulnerable they are. Throughout the century authoritarians have been able to hypnotise us with their programmes for confining the so-called beast that lurks in the flesh, and entrepreneurs have been able to make money by doing the opposite and exploiting our desires. All this has produced conflict among interested parties. Some of it is scandalous, some absurd and hypocritical; most of it has comic potential. This is just as well for ordinary citizens, who might find the system unbearable if they couldn't laugh sometimes at its merchandisers, its moralists, its policemen; and themselves.'

In 2009 Ferris produced a gentler book, Gower in History. Myth, People, Landscape a candid historical account of the peninsula near Swansea.

In the 1990s Ferris wrote a string of 'bio-pics' for BBC television. Among his subjects were Evan Roberts, the Loughor evangelist of the early 20th century, who claimed mystical powers; Aneurin Bevan, the rumbustious socialist MP who ushered in the National Health Service in 1948; John Barnard Jenkins, a Welsh political activist, who ran a one-man bombing campaign in 1969; and, inevitably, Dylan Thomas.

== Death ==
Ferris died on 16 November 2018 at Abergavenny, aged 89. He was survived by his wife Mary and their two children. A humanist service was held in Hay-on-Wye.
