= Dylan Thomas Boathouse =

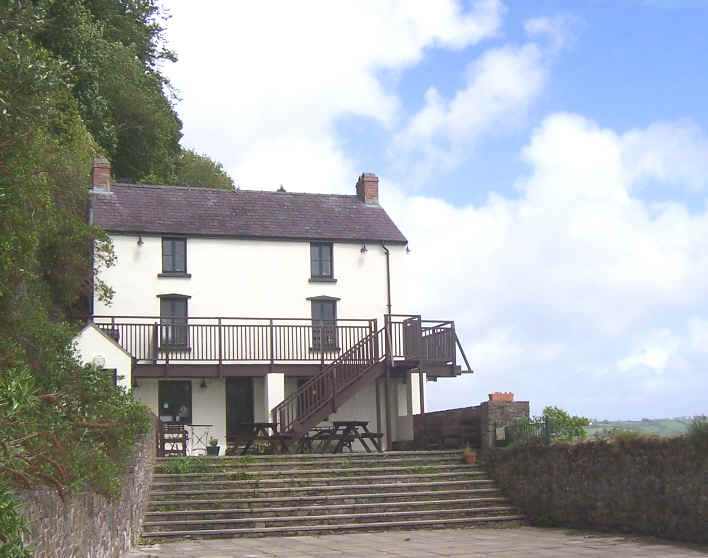
- The Boathouse, Laugharne

- Location within Carmarthenshire
- Location: Laugharne, Carmarthenshire, Wales
- Coordinates: 51.7722°N 4.4562°W
- Type: Historic house museum
- Owner: Carmarthenshire County Council
- Website: Dylan Thomas Boathouse

The Boathouse in Laugharne, Wales, was where Dylan Thomas lived with his family during his last four years between 1949 and 1953. The house is set in a cliff overlooking the Tâf estuary and is where he wrote many of his major pieces. It has been suggested that he wrote Under Milk Wood here but more recent research suggests that fewer than 300 lines of the play were written in Laugharne.

== History ==
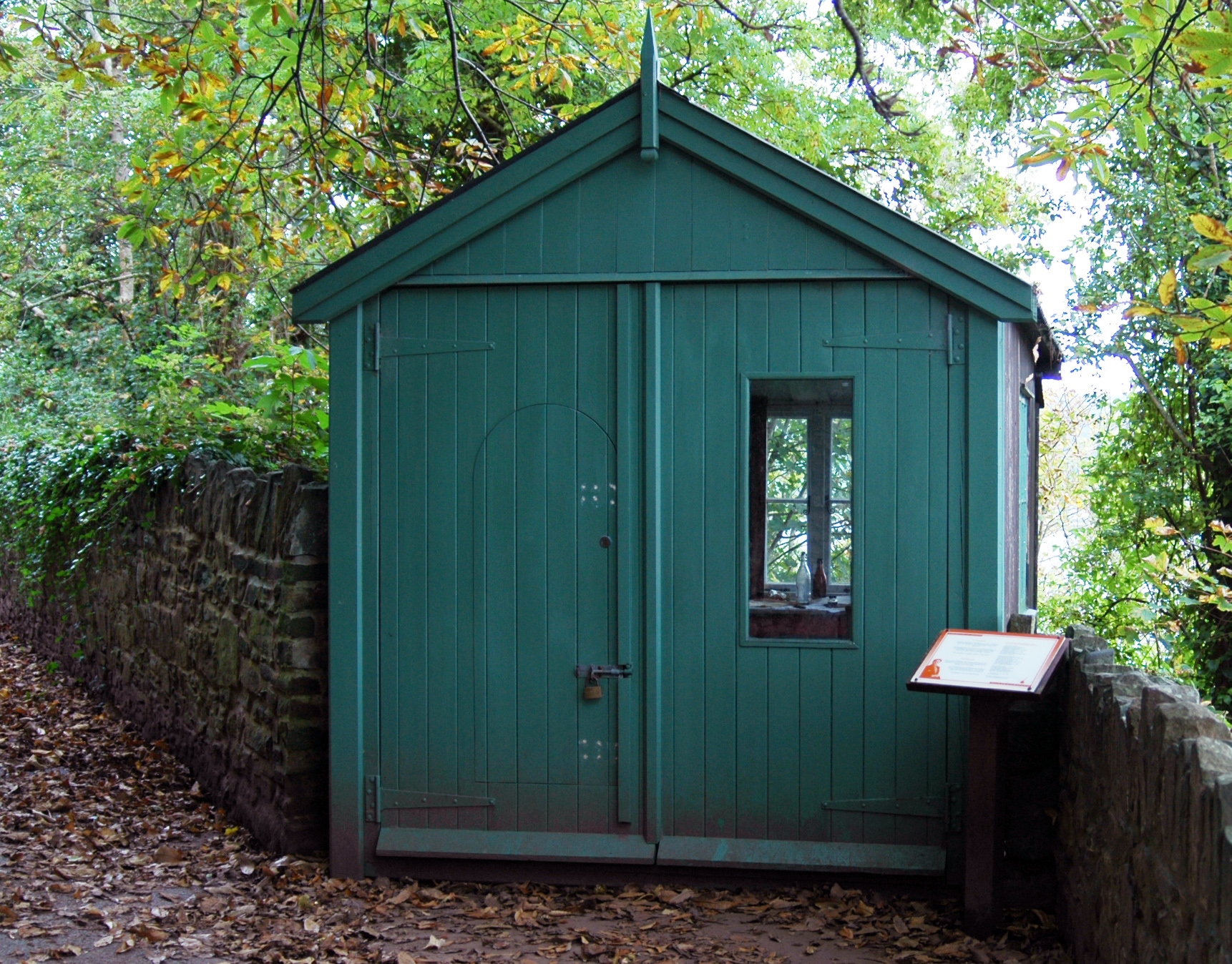
The writing shed used by Dylan Thomas, close to The Boathouse, overlooking the estuary of the River Taf

There are no records of the house being in existence prior to 1834, when it was leased by the local authority to a family named Scourfield. The road in which it stands was originally called Cliff Road, but has been renamed to Dylan's Walk.

Thomas first visited the village of Laugharne with a friend, the poet Glyn Jones, in 1934 and was attracted to it. He moved there four years later with his wife Caitlin, and the Boathouse was later bought for him by Margaret Taylor, first wife of the historian A. J. P. Taylor. Dylan and Caitlin brought up their three children, Aeronwy, Llewellyn and Colm.

For his parents, Thomas rented "Pelican House" in the town, and they lived there from 1949 until his father's death in 1953. After Dylan's own death in 1953, Caitlin Thomas was keen to leave Laugharne because of its painful memories. After she left to live in Italy, the Boathouse became the home of her late husband's mother, Florence Thomas, for the last five years of her life. It was subsequently purchased from Margaret Taylor by the trust managing the Thomas estate, on behalf of Caitlin, who sold it on to an educational charity before it was eventually acquired by Carmarthenshire County Council and opened to the public as a tourist attraction.

Thomas used a shed a little further along Cliff Road as his retreat, and did most of his writing there while he lived at the Boathouse. His poem, "Over Sir John's Hill", celebrated the view of the estuary it gave him, Sir John's Hill being located across the bay.

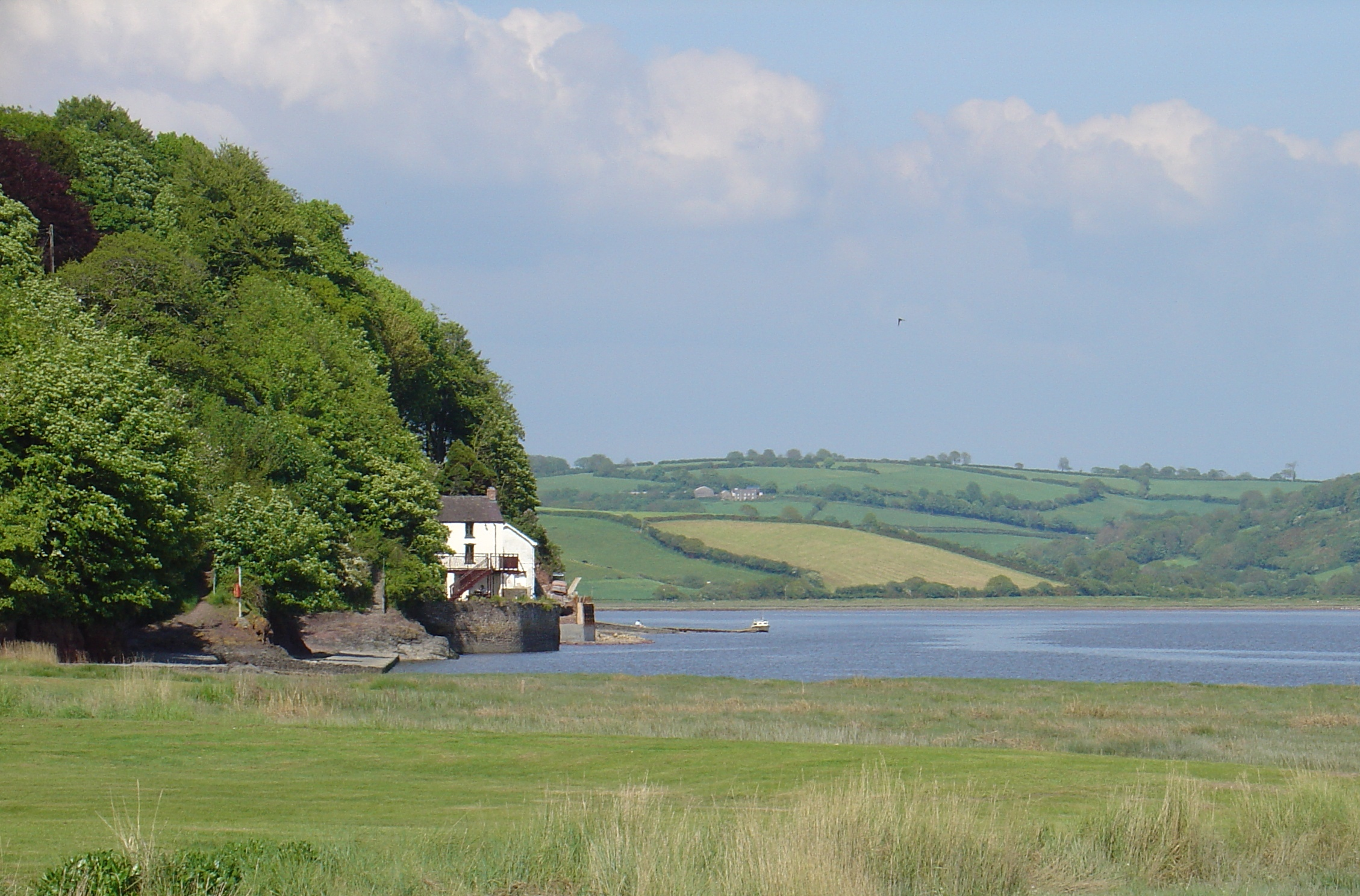
The Boathouse viewed from the south across the foreshore

Thomas's shed inspired Roald Dahl to create his own writing hut at his Gipsy House, his home in Buckinghamshire.

== Museum ==
The house is now owned by the Carmarthenshire County Council and serves as a museum, open to the public for most of the year. It contains Thomas memorabilia and some of the original furniture, including Dylan's father's desk. The house receives about 15,000 visitors a year. The interior has been returned to its 1950s appearance, with a recording of Thomas's voice playing in the background. Close to the main house is a clifftop "writing shed" where Thomas spent much of his time. The interior of the shed is reconstructed with a writing table littered with discarded papers as though Thomas were in the process of working on a book.

The exhibits include a bust of Dylan Thomas, formerly owned by Richard Burton and Elizabeth Taylor, a letter from former US President Jimmy Carter, and a 1936 photograph of Thomas, notable for having been taken into space on board the Space Shuttle Columbia in 1998.
