= Dylan Thomas Centre =

Municipal Building in Swansea, Wales

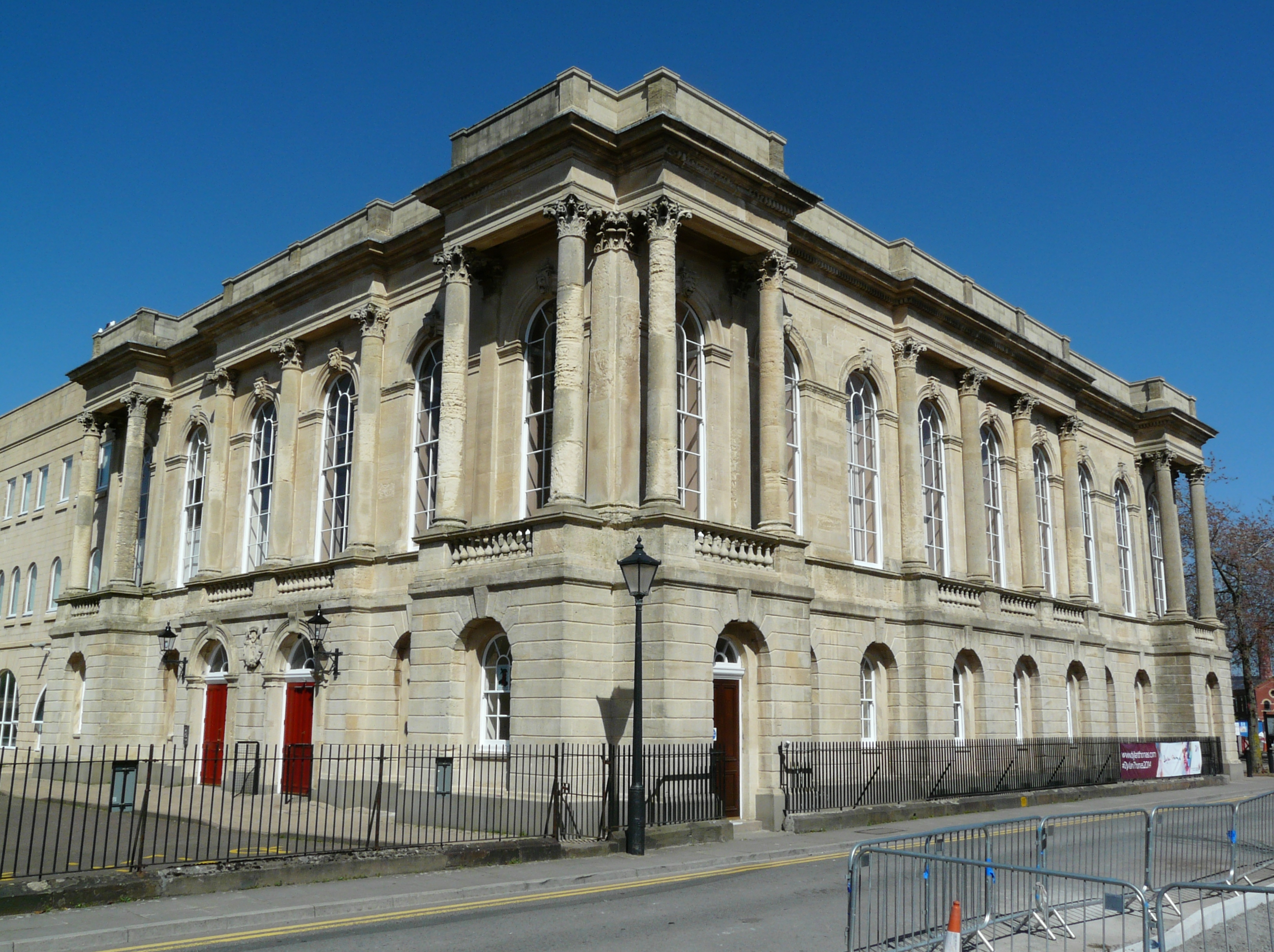
- Dylan Thomas Centre
- Interactive map of the Dylan Thomas Centre area
- Former names: Swansea Guildhall

General information
- Architectural style: neo-classical style
- Location: Swansea, Wales, Somerset Place, Swansea SA1 1RR
- Coordinates: 51°37′09.00″N 3°56′09.00″W
- Completed: 1829
- Renovated: 1995
- Owner: City and County of Swansea Council

Design and construction
- Architect: John Collingwood
- Main contractor: Thomas Bowen

Listed Building – Grade II*
- Official name: The Old Guildhall (Former Annexe to Dynevor Comprehensive School)
- Designated: 30 March 1987
- Reference no.: 11643

The Dylan Thomas Centre is an arts centre located in the Maritime Quarter in Swansea, Wales. It is a Grade II* listed building.

== History ==
The building was commissioned to replace a previous guildhall, which had been located near Swansea Castle and dated back to the late 16th century. The new building, which was designed by John Collingwood in the neo-classical style and built by Thomas Bowen, was completed in 1829. It was remodelled to the plans of Thomas Taylor in 1852, using a design which was modelled on the Temple of Jupiter Stator in Rome. The external design involved nine bays on each side with round-arched windows on the ground floor and tall round-arched windows flanked by Corinthian order columns on the first floor.

It was converted for use as a juvenile employment centre after the civic leaders moved to the new Swansea Guildhall in 1934. During the Second World War it was requisitioned by the army for use as a recruiting centre. After reverting to use as a juvenile employment centre, it became a College of Further Education in 1960 and then became an annexe to Dynevor School in 1970 before closing in 1982.

The building was officially re-opened by the American former President Jimmy Carter and the last Leader of the Swansea City Council, Trevor Burtonshaw, as the Dylan Thomas Centre in 1995. In 2012 a large part of the Centre was leased by Swansea's council to the University of Wales with the purpose of using it as a business centre for creative industries.

In October 2014, the Centre launched the permanent "Love the Words" exhibition which explores Dylan's life and work through a variety of media and including letters, books, worksheets and photographs. It was made possible with support of nearly £1 million from the Heritage Lottery Fund.

The Dylan Thomas Centre is home to a year-round programme of literary events, including book launches, plays, poetry evenings, changing exhibitions and science talks. It also hosts the annual Dylan Thomas Festival held between Dylan’s birth and death dates, 27 October to 9 November.
