= A High Wind in Jamaica =

A High Wind in Jamaica may refer to:

- A High Wind in Jamaica (novel), a 1929 novel
- A High Wind in Jamaica (film), a 1965 film based on the novel
