= Laugharne =

Town in Carmarthenshire, Wales

Laugharne: Welsh: Talacharn
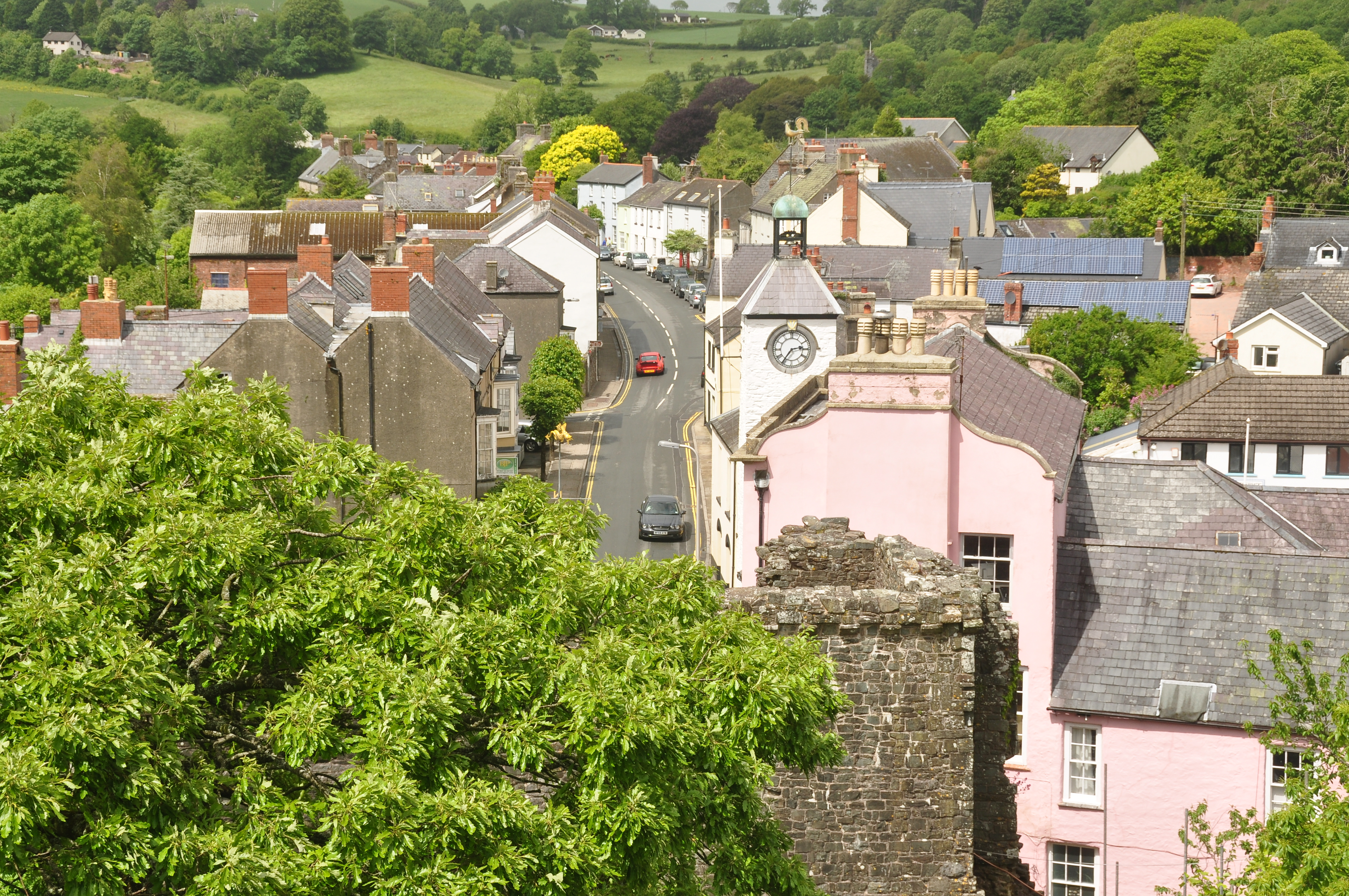
- Laugharne from the castle

- Location within Carmarthenshire
- Population: 1,222
- OS grid reference: SN301109
- Community: Laugharne Township
- Principal area: Carmarthenshire
- Preserved county: Dyfed
- Country: Wales
- Sovereign state: United Kingdom
- Post town: CARMARTHEN
- Postcode district: SA33
- Dialling code: 01994
- Police: Dyfed-Powys
- Fire: Mid and West Wales
- Ambulance: Welsh
- UK Parliament: Caerfyrddin
- List of places UK Wales Carmarthenshire 51.7694°N 4.4631°W Map of the Laugharne Township community

Laugharne (/ˈlɑːrn/; Welsh: Talacharn) is a town on the south coast of Carmarthenshire, Wales, lying on the estuary of the River Taf.

The ancient borough of Laugharne Township (Welsh: Treflan Lacharn) with its Corporation and Charter is a unique survival in Wales. In a predominantly English-speaking area, just on the Landsker Line, the community is bordered by those of Llanddowror, St Clears, Llangynog and Llansteffan. It had a population at the 2021 census of 1,100.

Laugharne Township electoral ward also includes the communities of Eglwyscummin, Pendine and Llanddowror.

Dylan Thomas, who lived in Laugharne from 1949 until his death in 1953, famously described it as a "timeless, mild, beguiling island of a town". It is generally accepted as the inspiration for the fictional town of Llareggub in Under Milk Wood. Thomas confirmed on two occasions that his play was based on Laugharne although topographically it is also similar to New Quay where he briefly lived.

== History ==
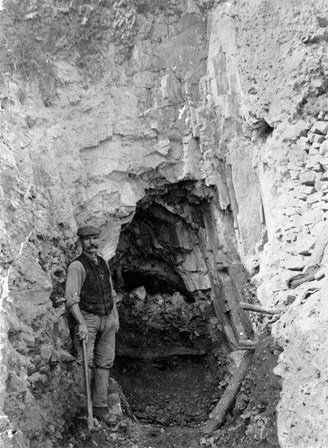
Excavations at Coygan Cave

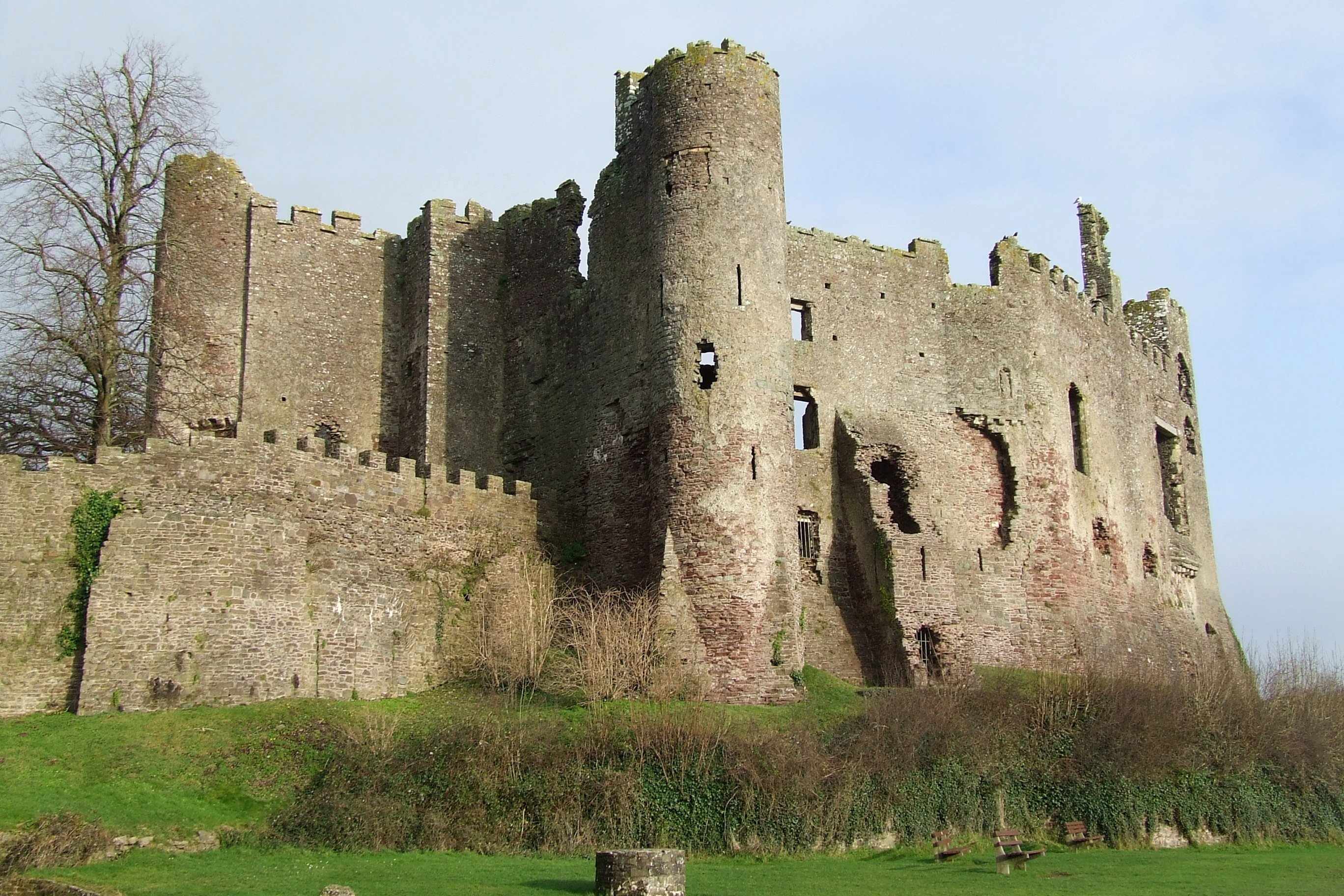
Laugharne Castle, originally known as Abercorran Castle

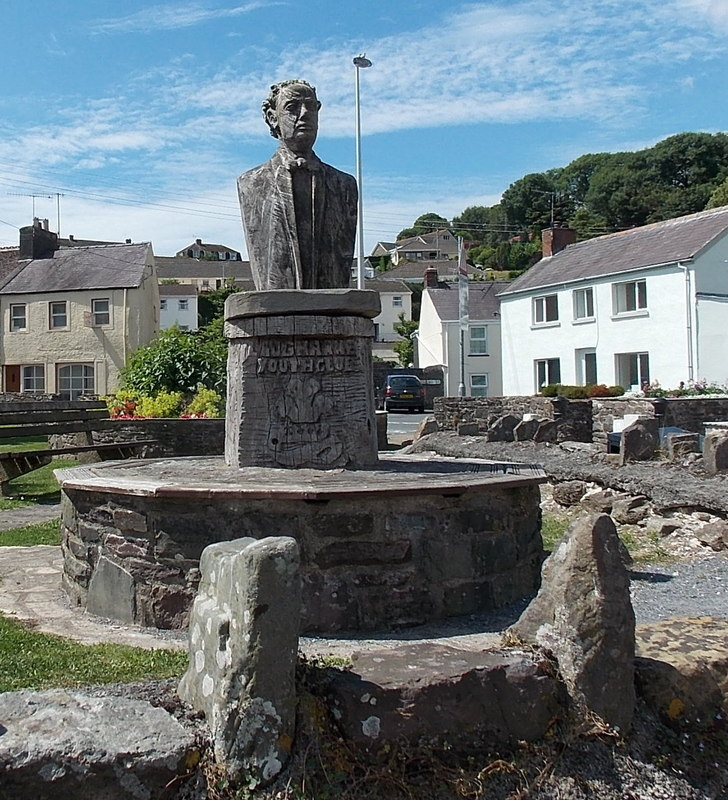
Dylan Thomas sculpture, The Strand; made by sculptor Simon Hedger

Throughout much of the Prehistoric period, human activity in the Laugharne area was centred on Coygan Bluff, a steep-sided limestone peninsula overlooking the now submerged coastal plain to the south. A natural cave on the southeast face of the promontory was excavated five times between 1865 and 1965 yielding significant evidence that its chambers acted as a temporary shelter for groups of hunter-gatherers moving through the landscape over 50,000 years ago and later material in the form of flint tools indicating an extended series of occupations from the Mesolithic and Neolithic periods. These discoveries suggest that the Township is probably the oldest still-inhabited settlement in Wales. Contemporary artefacts from the Mousterian period have also been found at nearby Paviland and Long Hole caves along with older hominin remains at Bontnewydd but, unlike at Laugharne, the communities associated with them are long vanished.

In the 4th century BC, a promontory fort was built at the summit of the hill. During the Bronze Age, Coygan camp is recorded as the site of an open settlement with funerary and ritual activity shown by a short-cist contracted inhumation. Further finds at a nearby round barrow on Laugharne Burrows together with Beaker burials at Plashett and Orchard Park confirm a more permanent community. Excavation in the 1960s of the defended enclosure on Coygan revealed two huts contemporary with the defensive bank and ditch and a significant quantity of pottery recovered dating to the late 3rd century AD indicating that the site was occupied deep into the Romano-British period. Another significant Iron Age settlement has also been identified at Glan-y-Mor Fort in the north of the township.

The Laugharne hoard of over 2000 coins and Roman bath remains found at Island House, together with the substantial Romano-British group of imported 6th-century finewares, coinage and glass from Coygan Camp, described as "one of the richest from a native settlement in south-west Wales", are all part of a concentration of traditional 'Roman' finds in the area. As evidence of activity from the period is generally scarce, these discoveries confirm the site as one of importance and suggest that it continued to be a high status settlement well beyond the Roman occupation. A 6th-century inscribed stone lies within Llansadwrnen church to the north, considered to be an outlying burial site of the more important secular settlement on Coygan. Laugharne Church, which contains a 9th-century Celtic slab stone and where a long cist grave cemetery has also been recorded, is thought to be a more likely early ecclesiastical site in the immediate area.

In the Early Middle Ages Laugharne was the main settlement in the area and home to the Lords of Laugharne. It was a commote of Gwarthaf, the largest of the seven cantrefi of the Kingdom of Dyfed in southwest Wales, later to be ruled by the Princes of Deheuberth. In 1093, Deheubarth was seized by the Normans following Rhys ap Tewdwr's death. In the early 12th century, grants of lands were made to Flemings by King Henry I when their country was flooded. In 1116, when Gruffydd ap Rhys (the son and heir of Rhys ap Tewdwr) returned from self-imposed exile, the king arranged for the land to be fortified against him; according to the Brut y Tywysogyon, Robert Courtemain constructed a castle at Laugharne in that year (this is the earliest reference to any castle at or near Laugharne). Courtemain may be the Robertus cum tortis manibus (English: Robert with twisted hands) mentioned in the Book of Llandaff, as one of a number of specifically named Norman magnates (Note: The other named magnates are Walter fitz Richard, Brian Fitz Count, William Fitz-Baldwin (son of Baldwin FitzGilbert), Robert de Chandos (who held Caerleon), Geoffrey de Broi, Pain fitzJohn, Bernard de Neufmarche, Gumbald of Ludlow, Roger de Berkeley (Lord of Dursley, and possible son of Roger I of Tosny), William the sheriff of Cardiff, William Fitz-Roger de Remu, and Robert Fitz Roger.) within the vicinity of the Llandaff diocese, who received a letter from Pope Callixtus II complaining about deprivations they had inflicted on diocesan church property; in the letter, the Pope warns he would confirm Bishop Urban's proclamations against them, if they do not rectify matters. The Brut states that Courtemain appointed a man named Bleddyn ap Cedifor as castellan; Bleddyn was the son of Cedifor ap Gollwyn, descendant and heir of the earlier kings of Dyfed (as opposed to those of Deheubarth). The castle was originally known as Abercorran Castle. When Henry I died, the Anarchy occurred, and Gruffydd, and his sons, Lord Rhys in particular, gradually reconquered large parts of the former Deheubarth.

In 1154, the Anarchy was resolved when Henry II became king; two years later, Lord Rhys agreed peace terms with Henry II and prudently accepted that he would only rule Cantref Mawr, constructing Dinefwr Castle there. Henry II de-mobilised Flemish soldiers who had aided him during the Anarchy, settling them with the other Flemings. From time to time, however, King Henry had occasion to go to Ireland, or Normandy, which Lord Rhys took as an opportunity to try and expand his own holdings. Returning from Ireland after one such occasion, in 1172, King Henry made peace with Lord Rhys, making him the justiciar of "South Wales" (i.e. Deheubarth). By 1247, Laugharne was held by Guy de Bryan; this is the earliest reference to his family possessing the castle, and his father (also named Guy de Bryan) had only moved the family to Wales in 1219 (from Devon). Guy de Bryan's descendants continued to hold the castle; his namesake great-grandson was Lord High Admiral of England. The latter's daughter Elizabeth inherited the castle and married an Owen of St Bride's who subsequently took his name – Owen Laugharne – from the castle despite Gerald of Wales calling the castle Talachar, and other variations on Laugharne/Talacharn appearing in ancient charters; one anonymous pre-20th-century writer erroneously claimed that Owen Laugharne gave his name to the castle rather than the other way around. Possession subsequently defaulted to the Crown, and in 1575, Queen Elizabeth granted it to Sir John Perrot. In 1644 the castle was garrisoned for the king and taken for Parliament by Major-General Rowland Laugharne, who subsequently reverted to the king's side. The population in 1841 was 1,389.

=== Laugharne Corporation ===
Laugharne Corporation is a rare surviving medieval corporation in the United Kingdom. The corporation was established in 1291 by Sir Guy de Brian (Gui de Brienne), a Marcher Lord. Laugharne Corporation holds extensive historical records. The corporation is presided over by the portreeve, wearing his traditional chain of gold cockle shells (one added by each portreeve, with his name and date of tenure on the reverse), the aldermen, and the body of burgesses. The title of portreeve is conferred annually, with the portreeve being sworn in on the first Monday after Michaelmas at the Big Court. The Corporation holds a court leet half-yearly formerly dealing with criminal cases, and a court baron every fortnight, dealing with civil suits within the lordship, especially in matters related to land, where administration of the common fields was dealt with. The Laugharne open-field system is one of only two surviving and still in use today in Britain.

'In Elizabeth's reign, the lordship passed to Sir John Perrott of Haroldston, a fact for which the inhabitants of Laugharne have had cause to regret. As at Carew Perrot modernised the castle, but he was the most unscrupulous "land-grabber" of his age, and in 1574 he induced the burgesses to part with 300 acres (120 ha) of land in return for an annuity of £9 6s. 8d. The records say that "diverse burgesses of the said towne did not assent to same", and that it was "to the great decaying of many". It would be interesting to know by what methods of bribery or intimidation Sir John was able to accomplish his nefarious purposes.'

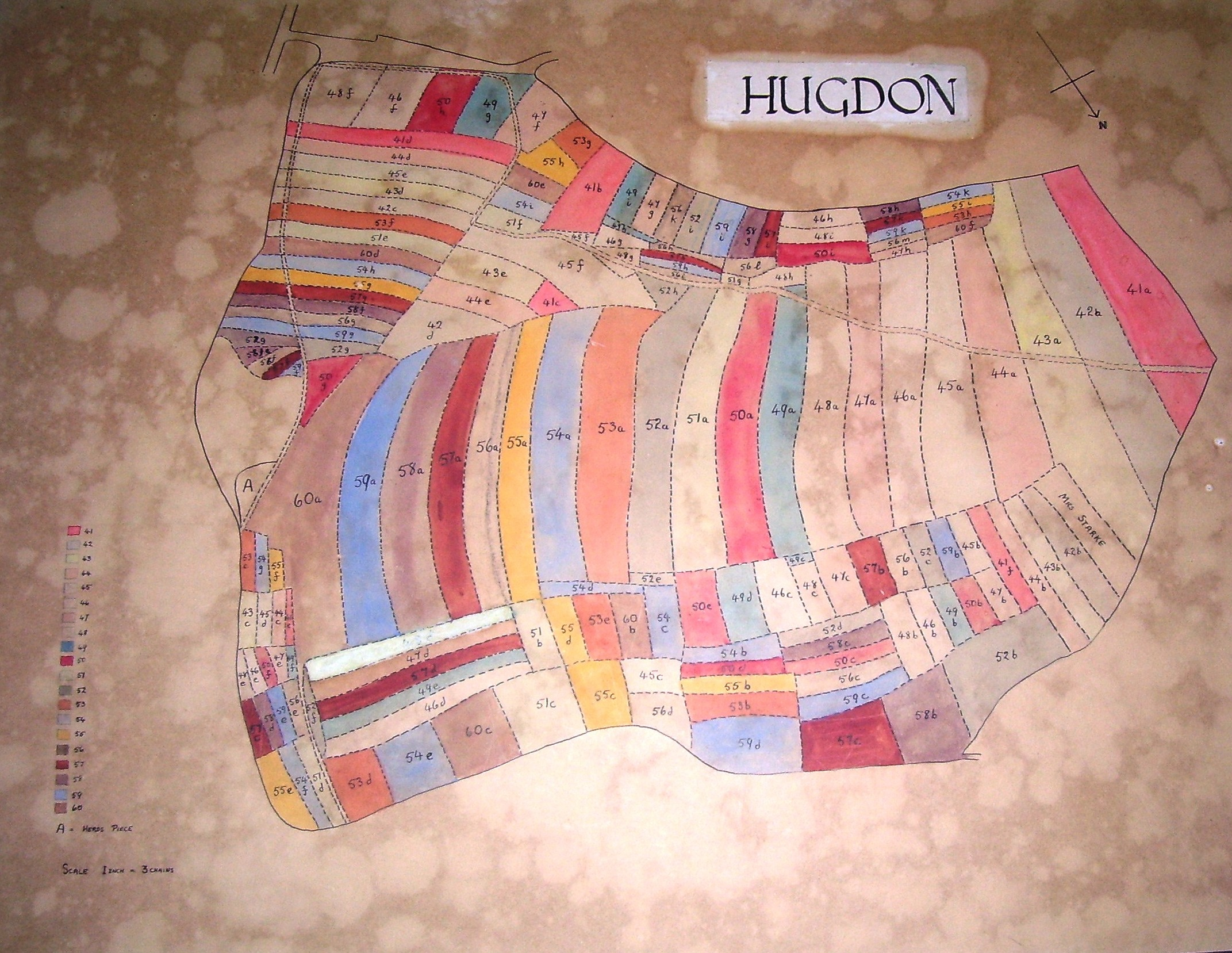
Plan of open-field system in common land on The Hugdon, a hill to the west of Laugharne

The most senior 76 burgesses get a strang of land on Hugden for life, to be used in a form of medieval strip-farming.

The chief toast at the Portreeve's feast is "to the immortal memory of Sir Guido de Brian"; then the Recorder must sing the following song:

When Sir Guy de Brien lived in Laugharne,
A jolly old man was he.
Some pasture land he owned, which he
Divided into three.
Says he "There's Hugdon and the Moor
They will the Commons please;
And all the gentlemen shall have
Their share down on the Lees."

== Governance ==
Since 1972, Laugharne Township Community Council has formed the lowest tier of local government for the town, represented by 11 community councillors.

For elections to Carmarthenshire County Council, Laugharne is covered by the Laugharne Township electoral ward, which also covers three neighbouring communities. The ward is represented by one county councillor. Independent councillor Jane Tremlett has represented the ward since 2004.

== St Martin's Church ==
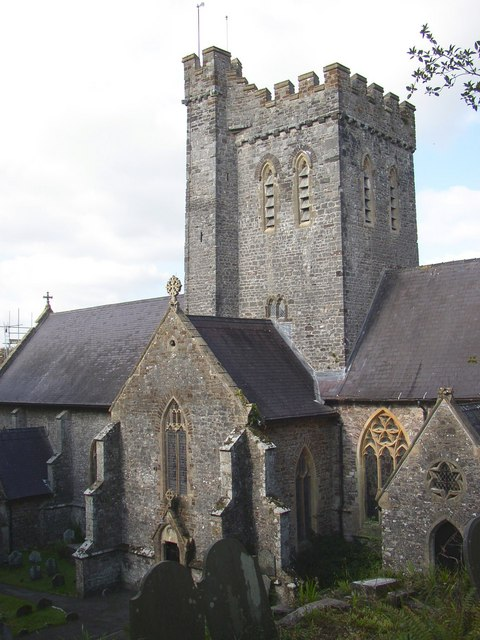
Tower of St Martin's church

The parish church of St Martin was built in the 14th century by Guido de Brian, lord of the manor of Laugharne. The original dedication was to St Michael as 15th-century records use this dedication. The churchyard, rectangular in shape, has shown evidence of Cist burials. Various archaeological finds have been made during grave-digging: a wheel-topped stone; a medieval tile and a fragment of what is believed to be a tomb canopy. The churchyard's 18th- and 19th-century monuments are Grade II listed for their group value.

The interior has a cross-slab, probably dating from the 9th or 10th century, with a carved Celtic design carved onto it. It has been suggested that the design is of Viking origin.

The church is today part of the United Benefice of Bro Sancler. Welsh poet and playwright Dylan Thomas is buried in the churchyard, his grave marked by a white cross.

== Landmarks ==
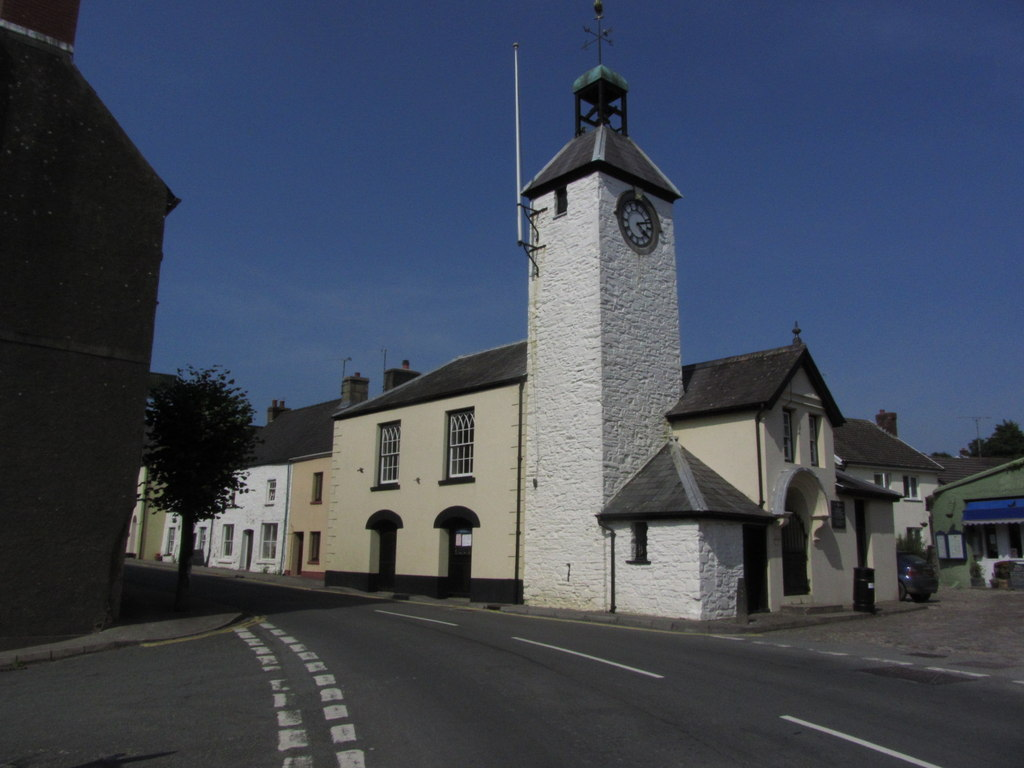
Laugharne Town Hall

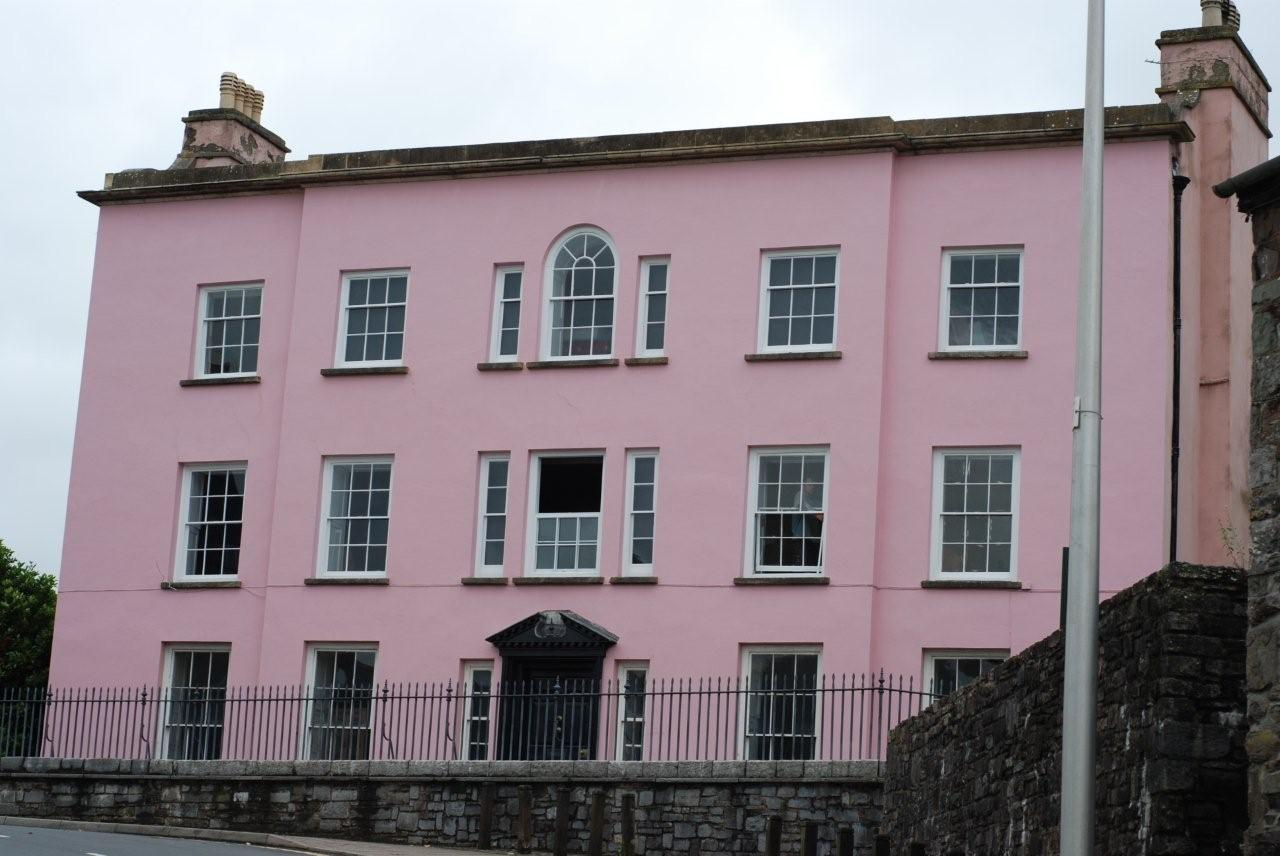
Castle House, Laugharne

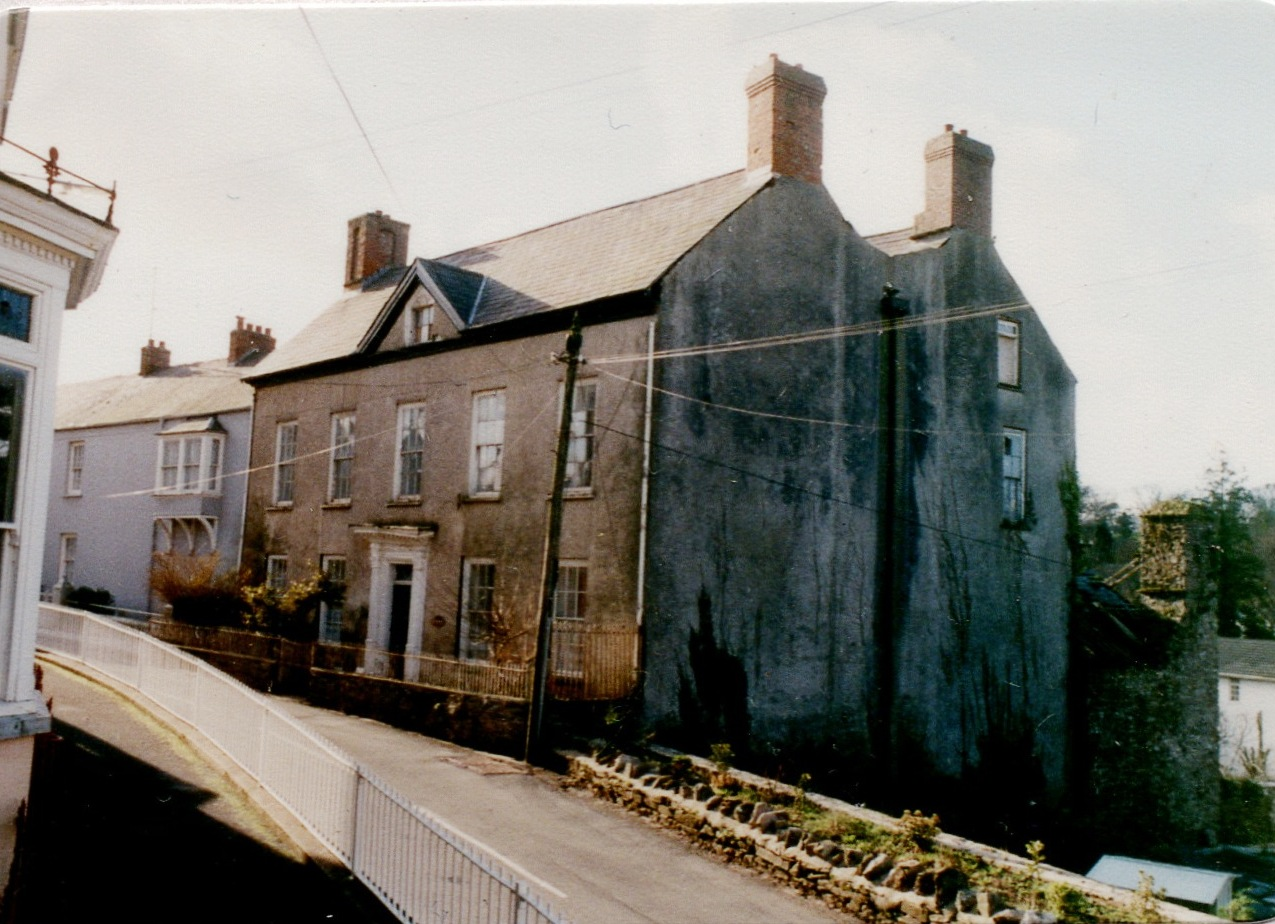
The Great House, Laugharne

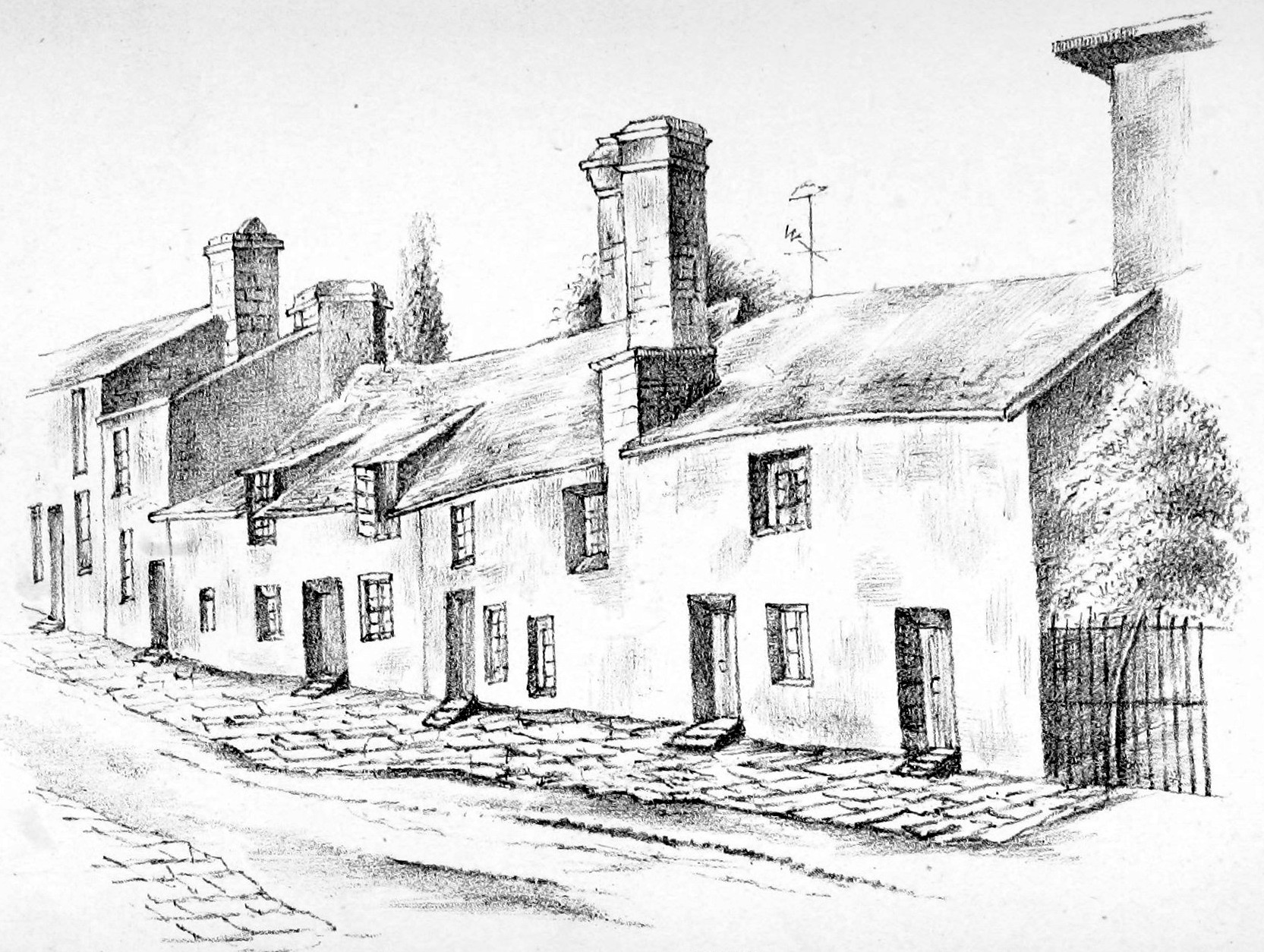
Wogan Street c. 1880

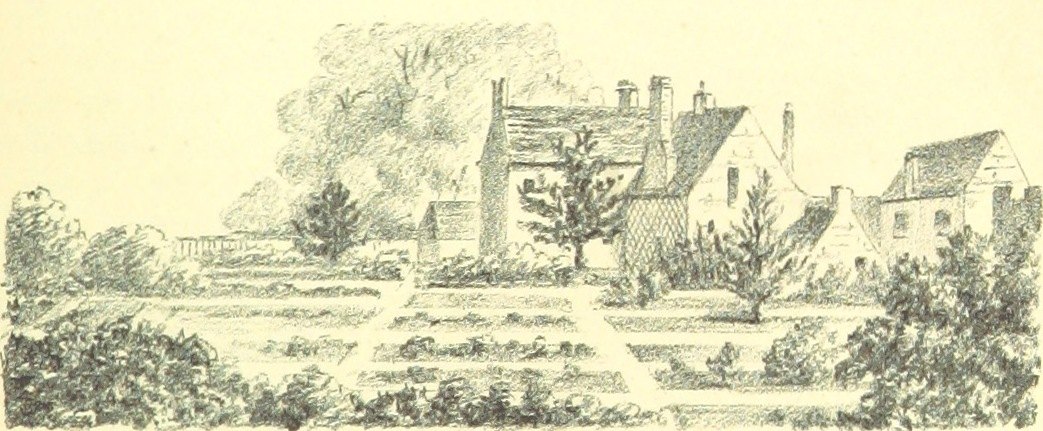
Island House in 1856

Local attractions include the 12th-century Laugharne Castle, Laugharne Town Hall and the estuary birdlife.

Laugharne Township currently has 69 listed buildings and contains several fine examples of Georgian townhouses including The Great House and Castle House together with Island House, parts of which date back to the Tudor period. All three properties are grade II* listed and a number of other early vernacular cottages have also survived.

There are a number of landmarks in Laugharne connected with the poet and writer Dylan Thomas. These include the Dylan Thomas Boathouse, where he lived with his family from 1949 to 1953, and now a museum; his writing shed; and the Dylan Thomas Birthday Walk, which was the setting for the work Poem in October.

== In popular culture ==
Many scenes in the BBC Television series Keeping Faith (broadcast in Welsh as Un Bore Mercher) were filmed in and around Laugharne, referred to as Abercorran.

== Laugharne weekend ==
The Laugharne Weekend, a three-day arts festival held in the spring of 2007, featured writers such as Niall Griffiths and Patrick McCabe. Headline performers since then have included Ray Davies, Will Self, Howard Marks and Patti Smith. The Millennium Hall is the main venue and smaller events are held locally such as in the Dylan Thomas Boathouse.

== Notable people ==
- Thomas Rede (ca.1390 – ca.1455), merchant, landholder, knight and public official of nearby Roche Castle
- Reginald Pecock (ca.1395 – ca.1461), prelate and writer, born in Laugharne
- Sir John Perrot (1528–1592), Lord Deputy of Ireland, Lord President of Munster and Privy Councillor to Elizabeth I, lived in Laugharne Castle
- Sir Thomas Perrot (1553–1594), Elizabethan courtier, soldier and Member of Parliament, lived in Laugharne Castle
- Sir James Perrot (1571–1636), writer and Member of Parliament, lived in Laugharne
- Sir Sackville Crowe (1595–1671), English politician, lived in Laugharne
- Rowland Laugharne (1607–1675), Parliamentary General; his 1644 siege of the castle, a former family home, left it an uninhabitable ruin
- Bishop William Thomas (1613–1689), Vicar of Laugharne, ejected by Cromwell. Later Bishop of St Davids and Bishop of Worcester.
- Sir John Powell (1632/3–1696), judge who presided over the trial of the Seven Bishops in 1688, lived in Laugharne
- Sir Thomas Powell (ca.1665 – 1720), lawyer and Member of Parliament, born in Laugharne
- Griffith Jones (1684–1761), educational pioneer, curate of Laugharne where he also resided in later years
- Bridget Bevan (1698–1779), also known as Madam Bevan, educationalist and philanthropist, lived in Laugharne
- Josiah Tucker (1713–1799), clergyman, economist and political writer; Dean of Gloucester, born in Laugharne
- Peter Williams (1723–1796), Methodist leader and publisher of Welsh language bibles, born at West Marsh Farm in Laugharne
- Mary Wollstonecraft (1759–1797), writer, philosopher, and advocate of women's rights, lived in Laugharne as a child
- James Augustus St. John (1795–1875), author and traveller, born in Laugharne
- Edward Falkener (1814–1896), architect, archaeologist, art historian and author, lived at the Glanymor Estate from 1866 until his death
- Arnold Wienholt, Sr. (1826–1895), Australian politician, lived at Castle House in Laugharne
- Edward Wienholt (1833–1904), Australian politician, lived at Castle House in Laugharne
- Agnes Mason (1849–1941), nun, born in Laugharne
- Joseph Arthur Hamilton Beresford (1861–1952), Australian naval commander, born in Laugharne
- Sir Edward Owen Cox (1866–1932), Australian politician & businessman, born in Laugharne.
- Caleb Rees (1883–1970), inspector of schools and author, lived at Island House in Laugharne from 1943 until his death
- William Charles Fuller (1884–1974), soldier, recipient of the Victoria Cross, born in Laugharne
- William Thomas David (1886–1948), Professor of Engineering at University College Cardiff and at the University of Leeds, born in Laugharne
- Raymond Jeremy (1890–1969), violist, professor of violin and viola at the Royal Academy of Music, born in Laugharne
- Richard Hughes (1900–1976), writer, lived at Castle House, instrumental in Dylan Thomas moving to Laugharne
- Dylan Thomas (1914–1953), poet, lived in Laugharne and is buried in the churchyard
- Derrick Childs (1918–1987), the Anglican Bishop of Monmouth and Archbishop of Wales, grew up in Laugharne
- Sir Kingsley Amis (1922–1995), novelist, poet and critic, wrote Booker Prize winner The Old Devils while living in Cliff House, Laugharne.
- George Tremlett (1939–2021), writer, former politician and bookshop owner, lived in Laugharne
- Aeronwy Thomas (1943–2009), poet, writer and translator of Italian poetry; the second child and only daughter of Dylan Thomas
- Gary Pearce (born 1960), rugby union and rugby league player, born in Laugharne
