= Laugharne Castle =

Castle in Laugharne, Carmarthenshire, Wales

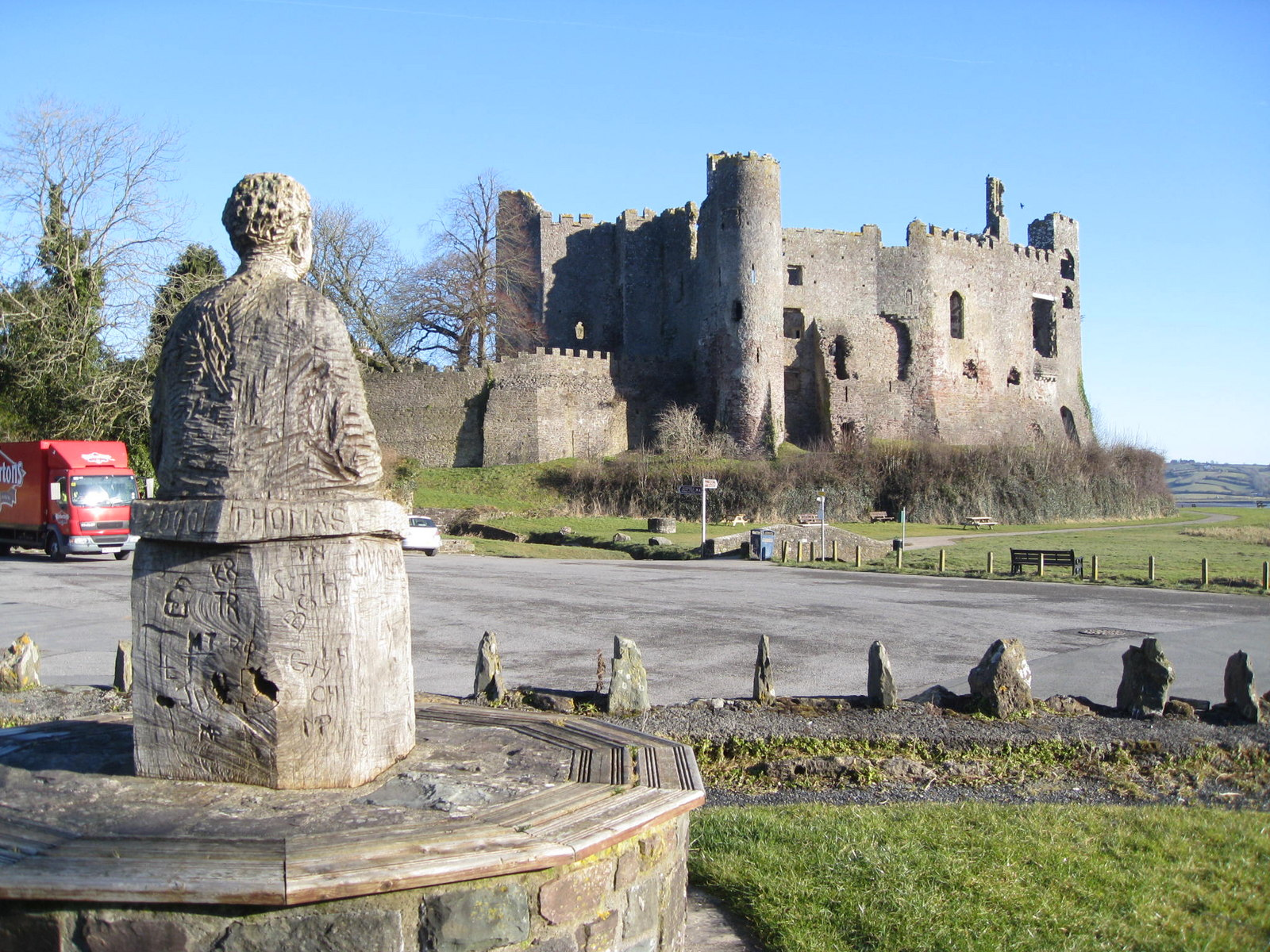
- Laugharne Castle

- Location within Wales

General information
- Architectural style: Castle
- Location: Laugharne, Carmarthenshire, Wales
- Coordinates: 51.769427°N 4.462016°W
- Completed: 12th century

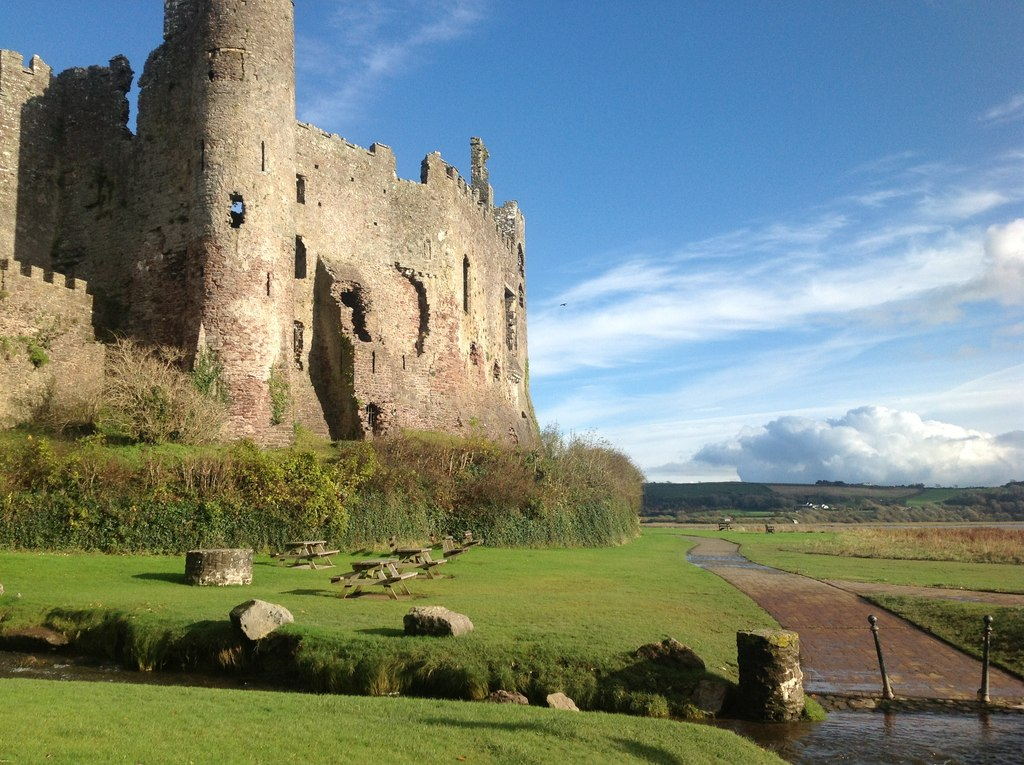
Laugharne Castle, crossing the bridge

Laugharne Castle (Welsh: Castell Talacharn) is in Laugharne, Carmarthenshire, Wales. The castle, located on the estuary of the River Tâf, was originally established in 1116. It was rebuilt as a Norman stronghold. There have been many alterations since then, including becoming a Tudor fortified manor house in the sixteenth century. It changed hands twice during the English Civil War, being eventually captured by Parliamentary forces in 1644.

== History ==
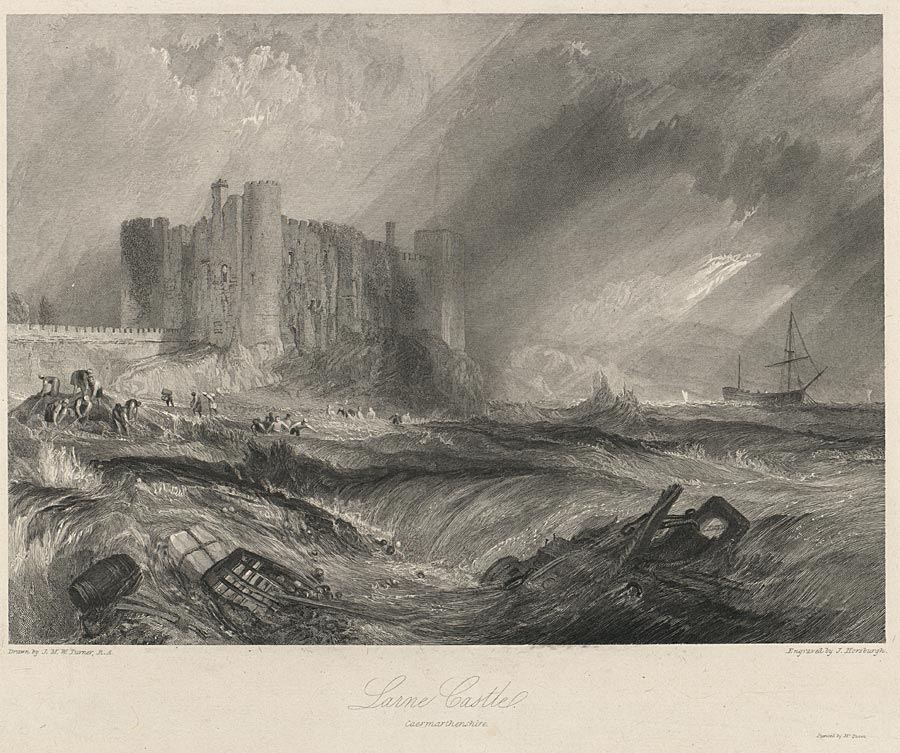
Engraving made in 1833

The original castle was established by 1116 as the castle of Robert Courtemain, who is recorded to have entrusted its care to the Welshman Bleddyn ap Cedifor. The castle was also the meeting place of Henry II of England and Rhys ap Gruffudd in 1171–1172, where they agreed a treaty of peace. When Henry II of England died in 1189 the castle, along with St Clears and Llansteffan, were seized by Rhys ap Gruffudd of Deheubarth in the same year. The castle may have been burnt down at that time. It was rebuilt by the Normans, and in 1215 was captured by Llywelyn the Great in his campaign across South Wales. By 1247 Laugharne was granted to the De Brian family. In 1257 Guy de Brian was captured at Laugharne Castle by Llywelyn ap Gruffudd and the castle destroyed.

It was in Laugharne in 1403 that Owain Glyndŵr's rebellion stalled. Perhaps lulled into complacency, he was tricked by an ambush and lost 700 men. When a local soothsayer then warned him to leave the area or be captured, he retreated. After this the rebellion petered out under the weight of greater English numbers; and by 1415, Owain Glyndŵr had disappeared, fading into myth. In 1584, Queen Elizabeth I granted Laugharne to Sir John Perrott (rumoured to have been an illegitimate son of Henry VIII) who was responsible for converting the castle from a fortification into a Tudor mansion.

During the Civil War, in 1644, Laugharne was captured by Royalists, but then attacked by the Parliamentary forces of Major-General Rowland Laugharne. After a week-long siege in which much of the castle was damaged by cannon fire, the Royalist garrison finally surrendered. The castle was slighted to prevent any further use. In about 1730 the new Castle House was built close by, the castle itself being left as a romantic ruin. Around the start of the 19th century the outer ward was laid out as formal gardens.

The author Richard Hughes leased Castle House in the 1930s and 1940s, and wrote his novel In Hazard (1938) working in the garden gazebo overlooking the river. Dylan Thomas stayed with Hughes and also worked in the gazebo on his Portrait of the Artist as a Young Dog (1940).

== Architecture ==
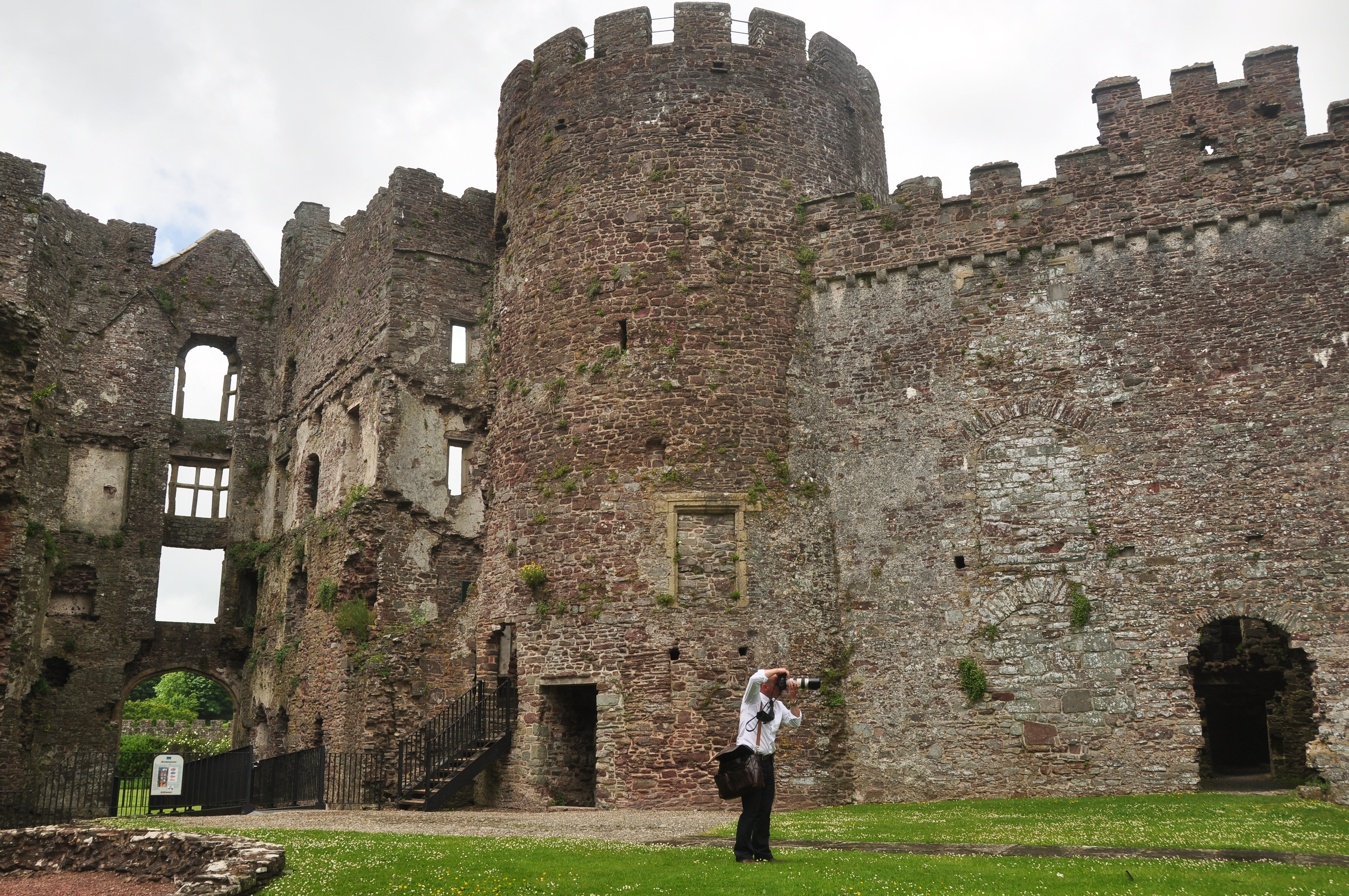
Laugharne Castle, interior

The ruins of the castle as seen now are the result of much development as the building graduated from an earthwork castle to a Tudor mansion. There is little trace of the original earthwork bank or the first stone hall, which may have been taken down in the twelfth century. The two robust round towers date from the rebuilding work done in the late thirteenth century. Some curtain walling from this time also survives. The north-west tower acted as a keep and also guarded the entry gate through the curtain wall to its south. This tower has a domed roof, but the other, three-storeyed tower has partially collapsed. The two extra storeys and the circular stairway were probably erected in the late thirteenth century, and a new hall was built at this time against the south of the curtain wall. The outer ward, with timber defences, may also date from this period. Further work done in the late thirteenth century includes an additional round tower at the south-west corner of the inner ward and a new, stronger gatehouse, and the defences of the outer ward were rebuilt in stone.

In the mid-fourteenth century, the height of the curtain walling at the south-western corner of the inner ward was increased, and the round tower and the inner gatehouse were also raised in height. This process is particularly noticeable because a greenish stone was used for the alterations that was significantly different in colour from the red sandstone used in the rest of the building. In the sixteenth century, the castle was remodelled into a substantial Tudor mansion with a more comfortable accommodation block and with mock battlements added to the curtain walls. Excavation has shown the remains of the Tudor cobbled courtyard, the presence of a pitched stone kitchen floor and the ground plans of the building at the different periods of its existence.

== Preservation ==
The castle is a scheduled ancient monument and was designated as a Grade I listed building on 30 November 1966, being "amongst the most substantial castle remain in Wales" (sic). The park is registered at Grade II on the Cadw/ICOMOS Register of Parks and Gardens of Special Historic Interest in Wales. The castle is under the care of Cadw and is open to the public from spring to autumn. Parking is a short distance away and access is available to wheelchair-users.

== See also ==
- List of castles in Wales
- Castles in Great Britain and Ireland
