= Laugharne Town Hall =

Municipal Building in Laugharne, Wales

- Neuadd y Dref Talacharn (Welsh)
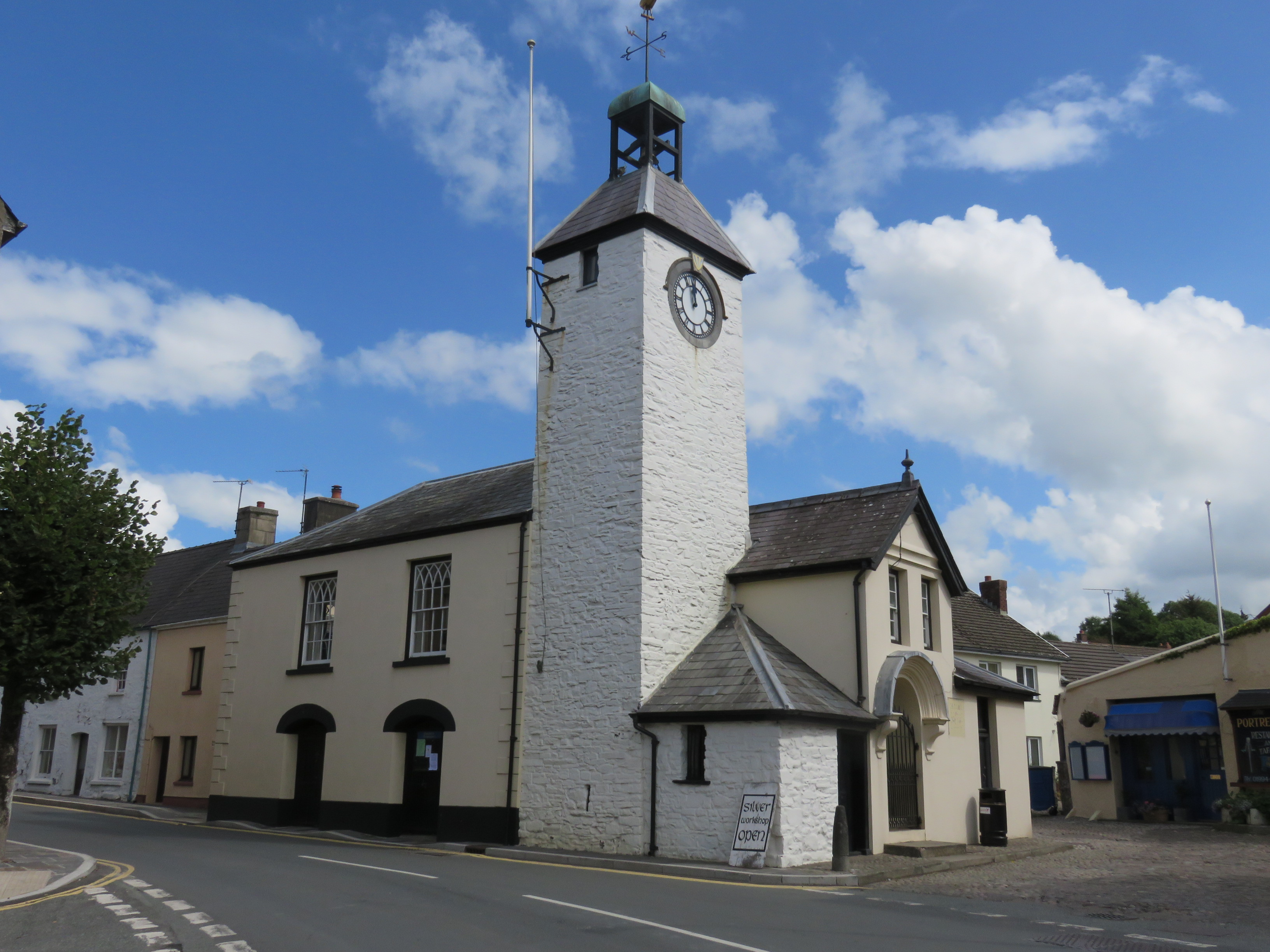
- Town Hall

- Shown in Carmarthenshire
- 51.7704°N 4.4622°W
- Location: Market Street, Laugharne

History
- Built: 1747

Site notes
- Architectural style: Italianate style

Listed Building – Grade II*
- Official name: Laugharne Town Hall
- Designated: 2 December 1951
- Reference no.: 9659

Laugharne Town Hall (Welsh: Neuadd y Dref Talacharn) is a municipal building in Market Street in Laugharne, Carmarthenshire, Wales. The structure, which is the meeting place of Laugharne Corporation, is a Grade II* listed building.

== History ==
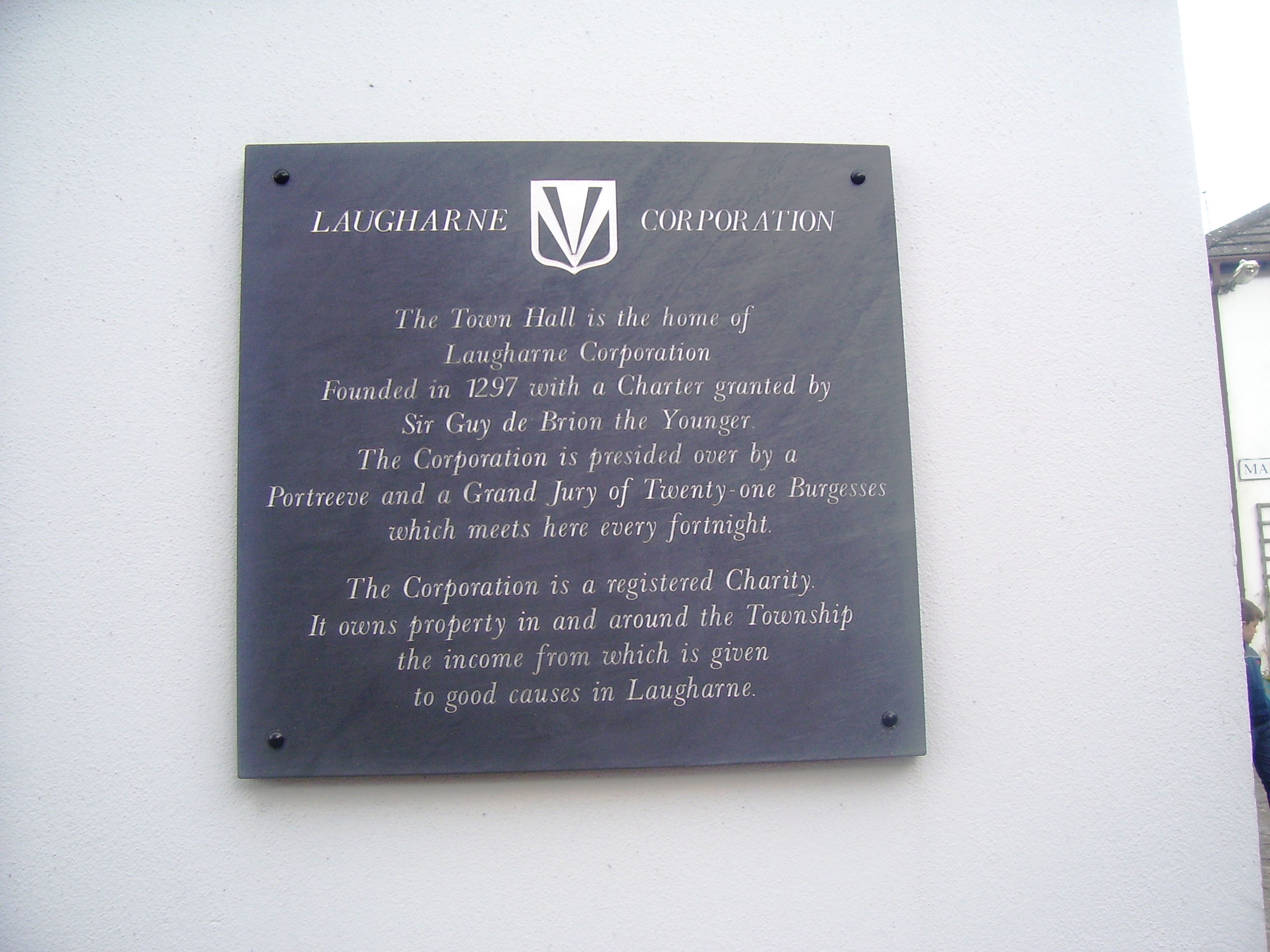
Plaque on the south side of the town hall

The first municipal building in the town was an ancient guildhall located on or near the same site which may have dated back to the formation of Laugharne Corporation by the Marcher Lord, Sir Guy de Brian (Gui de Brienne), in the late-13th century. By the mid-18th century the tower had become ruined and civic leaders decided to erect a new structure. The new building was designed in the Italianate style, built in rubble masonry with a whitewash finish and was completed in 1747.

The design involved an asymmetrical main frontage with a hall section of two bays facing onto Market Street with rusticated quoins and an attached tower. The hall section featured two segmental headed openings with wrought iron grills and voussoirs on the ground floor and two windows on the first floor. The tower, which featured clock faces on the north and south sides, was surmounted by a pyramid-shaped roof. Internally, the principal rooms were the market hall on the ground floor and the courtroom on the first floor.

A lean-to containing a lock-up for petty criminals was added to the east side in 1774, a bellcote with a bell designed and cast by Rudhall of Gloucester together with a weather vane in the form of a peacock were added to the roof in 1786, and the first floor was re-fenestrated with Gothic-style sash windows in 1814.

Following the implementation of the Municipal Corporations Act 1883, which abolished the borough council, fortnightly meetings of the court baron continued take place in the town hall under the auspices of a Grand Jury, which was presided over by the portreeve, acting as the chief magistrate, to ensure the corporation's extensive property portfolio continued to be properly managed.

The clock was replaced in the late 19th century and a gabled porch was added in 1910. In the early 1950s, the poet, Dylan Thomas, who lived in the town, wrote to his patron, Margaret Taylor, describing Laugharne as "timeless" and, with the town hall in mind, claiming that "it's clock tells the time backwards".

== See also ==
- Grade II* listed buildings in Carmarthenshire
