= The Fox in the Attic =

- First UK edition
- Author: Richard Hughes
- Language: English
- Series: The Human Predicament
- Genre: Historical fiction
- Publisher: Chatto & Windus (UK); Harper & Brothers (US)
- Publication date: 1961
- Followed by: The Wooden Shepherdess

The Fox in the Attic, written by Welsh writer Richard Hughes and published in 1961, is the first part of the unfinished novel The Human Predicament. In a note to the first edition, this was described by the author as "a long historical novel of my own times culminating in the Second World War." This description left open the question of whether The Fox in the Attic was to be the first part of a trilogy, a tetralogy or an even longer work.

== Plot summary ==
The novel opens in 1923. The protagonist, a young Welsh aristocrat named Augustine Penry-Herbert, discovers the body of a young girl and is incorrectly suspected of having something to do with her accidental death. Augustine decides to leave England and visit distant relations in Germany. He falls in love with his cousin Mitzi amidst the rise of Nazism, including the Munich Putsch. At the end of the novel, Mitzi, who has lost her sight, enters a convent and Augustine returns to England.

== Background ==
Richard Hughes was cadet in training when the 1918 armistice was signed and spent World War II as an Admiralty bureaucrat; it was this experience that caused him to write The Human Predicament. In order to adequately mix his fictional characters with historical figures, Hughes relied on firsthand accounts and family papers from German relatives and friends, including distant relation Baroness Pia von Aretin (whom he acknowledges in the 1961 US edition of the novel) and Helene Hanfstaengl, wife of Ernst Hanfstaengl, who had been a friend of Hitler's in the early 1920s. Hughes also gives an explanation for his unconventional description of the Munich Putsch saying that his narrative "is based on a vivid contemporary account by an actual Nazi participant, a Major Goetz. This account was contained in a letter to a friend dated 26th November, 1923, which some weeks later found its way into the German press."

== Publication history ==
The Fox in the Attic was originally published in 1961 by Chatto & Windus: London as volume 1 of The Human Predicament, and then in the United States by Harper & Brothers: New York. This was 23 years after Hughes's previous novel, In Hazard: A Sea Story, and 33 years after A High Wind in Jamaica, which was a best seller in the United Kingdom and America. It was published the following year in Sweden (Stockholm: Norstedt) as Räven på vinden.

The second volume in The Human Predicament, The Wooden Shepherdess, was published in 1973 by Chatto & Windus: London; it carries on the story to 1934 and the Night of the Long Knives. The third volume was left unfinished, but twelve completed chapters were included in the 1995 edition.

== Reception ==
The Fox in the Attic was featured in the 2 February 1962 Life Guide section of Life Magazine. In this short blurb, Life introduced Hughes's attempt to write The Human Predicament trilogy, calling it a "vast, Tolstoyan novel sequence" while also saying of the first volume, "Hughes effectively interweaves the life of his hero...with the fortunes of top Nazidom." Publication in Britain was accompanied by widespread critical acclaim for its mingling of truth and fiction. Goronwy Rees was moved to write: "There are few living writers of whom one would say that they had genius; but somehow it seems the most natural thing in the world to say about Richard Hughes." At the same time, many critics felt that it would be impossible to judge the book until the completion of the whole novel.
