= William David (disambiguation) =

William David (born 1983) is an Indian cinematographer.

William David or Bill David may also refer to:

- William Thomas David (1886–1948), British engineer and academic
- Bill David, British chemist
