= The Calling (2000 film) =

2000 British-German horror film

- Directed by: Richard Caesar
- Written by: John Rice; Rudy Gaines
- Produced by: Norbert Preuss
- Starring: Laura Harris; Francis Magee; Richard Lintern; Alex Roe
- Cinematography: Joachim Berc
- Edited by: Alexander Berner
- Music by: Christopher Franke
- Distributed by: Constantin Film (Germany); Artisan Entertainment (United States); Summit Entertainment (International)
- Release dates: December 21, 2000 (Germany); January 15, 2002 (United States)
- Running time: 89 minutes
- Countries: United Kingdom; Germany
- Language: English

The Calling is a 2000 horror film directed by Richard Caesar. Following in the same vein as such classics as Rosemary's Baby and The Omen, The Calling is the story of Kristie St. Clair, the involuntary mother of the Antichrist, and possibly the only person who can stop the coming of a modern-day apocalypse. The film stars Laura Harris, Richard Lintern, Francis Magee, Alex Roe, and Alice Krige. The film is a co-production between the United Kingdom and Germany.

== Plot ==
Kristie believes that she has the perfect life: a marriage to Marc, her charming TV personality husband, Dylan, her beautiful young son, an enchanting house in the British countryside, and a successful new career. However, as time passes, occurrences manifest that raise her suspicions.

Multiple incidents prompt these concerns. Dylan's violent behavior, which includes the impaling of his pet guinea pig on a stake and his apathy towards the death of a friend. Elizabeth, an old family friend, appears to be trying to replace Kristie whilst keeping her away from Marc and Dylan. Marc himself begins acting strangely, overreacting after a dog bite and hanging the dog in the backyard as punishment.

As her family withdraws further from her and she loses her best friend, Kristie encounters a mysterious taxi driver with unexplained knowledge of the events.

With the help of the taxi driver, Kristie comes to the conclusion that unless she stops him, Dylan will lead mankind into a horrifically malevolent future.

Eventually, Kristie, who stops caring for Dylan, escapes the hospital with Father Mullin and tells him it was a new time. Father Mullin rips off his white collar tab and throws it out the window as they drive away.

== Cast ==
- Laura Harris as Kristie St.Clair
- Richard Lintern as Marc St.Clair
- Francis Magee as Carmac
- Alex Roe as Dylan St.Clair
- Alice Krige as Elizabeth Plummer
- John Standing as Jack Plummer
- Peter Waddington as Father Mullin
- Nick Brimble as Police Inspector Oliver Morton
- Rachel Shelley as Shelly
- Camilla Power as Lynette
- Deborah Baxter as Receptionist
- Jack MacKenzie as Norman
- Roger Brierley as Reverend

== Film locations ==
The majority of filming was in Cornwall, England, UK and London, England, UK.

== Reception ==
The film received mixed to negative feedback from critics and audiences. Walter Chaw gave the film two stars out of four on Film Freak Central, writing that "[t]he film doesn't hold up to any kind of scrutiny and the acting is, how can I say it, "Tennessee Williams-y".
