= Deborah Baxter =

English actress

Deborah Baxter (born 1954) is an English actress who appeared in the films A High Wind in Jamaica and The Wind and the Lion.

== Career ==
Born in England, Baxter was selected from 1,000 applicants for the starring role of Emily Thornton in the film A High Wind in Jamaica, after having been discovered by talent agent Maureen Riscoe. She received much acclaim for her part in the film. After taking part in much stage work, she returned to film ten years later, being cast by fan John Milius in The Wind and the Lion (1975), playing Alice Roosevelt, daughter of U.S. President Theodore Roosevelt. Her only film role in recent years was a walk-on in The Calling (2000).

== Personal life ==
Baxter married and retired from film to focus on family, though she continued acting in theatre and television. She currently lives in Kent with her husband, David Carr, a solicitor.

== Filmography ==
=== Film ===
Year	Title	Role	Notes
1965	A High Wind in Jamaica	Emily Thornton	
1975	The Wind and the Lion	Alice Roosevelt	
2000	The Calling	Receptionist	

=== Television ===
Year	Title	Role	Notes
1973	Thirty Minutes Worth	—	Episode #3.4
1975	A Little Bit of Wisdom	Blood Donor Nurse	Episode #2.2
1975	My Honourable Mrs	Mademoiselle Dupont	Episode: "A Home from Home from Home"
1976	Clayhanger	Mary	Episode: "Dartmoor"
