= A High Wind in Jamaica (film) =

1965 film directed by Alexander Mackendrick

- Original film poster by Howard Terpning
- Directed by: Alexander Mackendrick
- Screenplay by: Stanley Mann; Ronald Harwood; Denis Cannan
- Based on: A High Wind in Jamaica (1929 novel) by Richard Hughes
- Produced by: John Croydon
- Starring: Anthony Quinn; James Coburn; Lila Kedrova; Gert Fröbe
- Cinematography: Douglas Slocombe
- Edited by: Derek York
- Music by: Larry Adler
- Production company: 20th Century Fox
- Distributed by: 20th Century Fox
- Release dates: 24 May 1965 (London); 26 May 1965 (Los Angeles)
- Running time: 103 minutes
- Country: United States; United Kingdom
- Language: English
- Box office: $2,260,000

A High Wind in Jamaica is a 1965 swashbuckler film directed by Alexander Mackendrick for 20th Century Fox. It is adapted by Stanley Mann, Ronald Harwood, and Denis Cannan from Richard Hughes' 1929 novel. It stars Anthony Quinn and James Coburn as pirates who capture five children. The cast also features Lila Kedrova, Deborah Baxter, Nigel Davenport, Dennis Price, Isabel Dean, Martin Amis (in his sole acting role) and Gert Fröbe.

Though a box office disappointment on initial release, the film received generally positive reviews, and its reputation has grown over time.

== Plot ==
A hurricane hits Jamaica in the mid-19th century. Frederick and Alice Thornton feel it is time to send their five children — Emily, Rachel, John, Edward, and Laura — to England for a more civilised upbringing and education.

During the voyage, pirates board the ship; the children accidentally leave on the pirate ship. The pirate captain, Chavez, and first mate Zac, not wanting to risk a kidnapping charge, decide to sail to Tampico and leave the children with Rosa, a good-hearted brothel madam who will keep them safe.

Rosa warns the pirates that the law is after them. Since they are innocent of the crimes they are accused of — namely, murdering the children — Chavez and Zac are unconcerned. However, when John slips from a brothel window and dies, Rosa, not wanting any involvement in a potential murder case, insists Chavez take the remaining children away. The crew feel that the children are unlucky and demand abandoning them on the next island. When Emily falls ill, Chavez refuses to attack a passing Dutch vessel, wanting it to take Emily and the children to safety. His men mutiny, lock up Chavez, seize the Dutch boat, and capture its captain.

A Royal Navy cutter appears and the panicked pirates re-board their own ship. Emily is awakened by the bound Dutch captain, who storms frantically into her room holding a knife and, speaking only Dutch, is imploring her to cut his bindings. Terrified and dazed by the sleeping draughts Chavez gave to soothe her pain, she mistakes his intentions and stabs him to death. The shocked Chavez intervenes too late and is left with blood on his hands. He and his former crew are taken prisoner and shipped to Britain for trial. Under questioning in court, the barrister twists Emily's testimony to imply she blames Chavez for killing the Dutch captain. The pirates are sentenced to hang for the death, instead of being imprisoned for piracy.

In the final scene children play innocently by a lake. Emily stands amongst them - staring at a model ship.

== Cast ==
- Anthony Quinn as Chavez
- James Coburn as Zac
- Dennis Price as Mathias
- Lila Kedrova as Rosa
- Nigel Davenport as Frederick Thornton
- Isabel Dean as Alice Thornton
- Kenneth J. Warren as Capt. Marpole
- Ben Carruthers as Alberto
- Gert Fröbe as Dutch Captain
- Brian Phelan as Curtis
- Charles Laurence as Tallyman
- Philip Madoc as Guardia Civil
- Viviane Ventura as Margaret Fernandez
- Trader Faulkner, Charles Hyatt, and Dan Jackson as Pirates
- Kenji Takaki as Cook

The Children

- Deborah Baxter as Emily Thornton
- Roberta Tovey as Rachel Thornton
- Martin Amis as John Thornton
- Jeffrey Chandler as Edward Thornton
- Karen Flack as Laura Thornton

== Production ==
=== Development and writing ===
Richard Hughes' novel had previously been adapted into a 1943 Broadway play, The Innoncent Voyage, by Paul Osborn. James Mason was attached to star in a film version with writer-director Nunnally Johnson, but became disgruntled over what he saw as 20th Century Fox's whitewashing of the novel's darker themes. Producer Jerry Wald was attached to produce, with John and Hayley Mills set to star, before his death in 1962.

Alexander Mackendrick was hired on the basis of his work on Sammy Going South. He was similarly dissatisfied with Johnson's script, and convinced Anthony Quinn to use his clout to pressure Fox into commissioning a more-faithful script.

=== Filming ===
Shooting took place on-location in Jamaica and at Pinewood Studios in England.

A 15-year-old Martin Amis played John Thornton. This was his sole acting role, as he was better known as a novelist.

=== Post-production ===
The score was composed by Larry Adler, with lyrics written by poet Christopher Logue. Mike LeRoy sang the title theme.

Mackendrick expressed dissatisfaction with the final cut, saying Fox removed 25 minutes of footage against his wishes.

== Reception ==
=== Box office ===
According to Fox records, the film needed to earn $6,300,000 in rentals to break even and made $2,260,000, meaning it made a loss.

=== Critical response ===
Reviews were mixed to positive, with some critics expressing disappointment that aspects of the novel were lost in the transition to film. A. H. Weiler of The New York Times wrote, "Although hands involved are either experienced or willing, a good deal of the nuance, philosophy and insight into the human condition for which the book was lauded, appear to be missing on the screen. This is simply a voyage full of sound and fury but one without much conviction or meaning." Richard L. Coe of The Washington Post called it "an absorbing, unusual and fit-for-the-family film, though it will not satisfy those who treasure the Richard Hughes novel ... By shifting the focus onto the pirate-captain, the film all but buries the role the children play." Philip K. Scheuer of the Los Angeles Times wrote, "it is a good movie, an entertaining movie, but it lacks the dirk-sharp bite of the author's prose, and the antic madness that made it such an astonishing delight now cuts through only fitfully."

Variety was generally positive, noting a "warm screenplay" and "often spectacular treatment" given to the color photography. A review in The Monthly Film Bulletin stated that although Hughes' novel had "undergone a softening process," it was "surprising how well the film manages to suggest the feeling that the children are living in a world of their own as they play happily throughout their ordeal ... Equally good is the atmosphere of superstitious terror among the native crew, fed by the children's innocent teasing."

Wendy Michener for Maclean's called the film "a pleasantly old-fashioned sort of adventure.... As in the novel by Richard Hughes, the movie takes pleasure in comparing the anarchy and amorality of the children’s play with the grown-up play of the pirates in search of stolen booty. There’s a constant tension between the loyalties of the adult world and the world of children, each with its own code of honor and its own kind of cruelty."

Retrospective appraisal of the film has been positive. A review in Time Out called it "pure cinema and pure entertainment, with comedy and tragedy ironically balanced in the combination of childhood dreams and adult dread." Philip French called it "a subtle, psychological fable," while praising Douglas Slocombe's cinematography and Larry Adler's score.
