= Coygan Cave =

Cave and archaeological site in the United Kingdom

- location in Wales Coygan Cave (the United Kingdom)
- 51°45′16″N 4°29′12″W
- Location: near Laugharne
- Region: Carmarthenshire, Wales

Site notes
- Material: Karst

Coygan Cave was an ossiferous cave near Laugharne in Carmarthenshire, Wales. The cave was about a 1 mile (1,600 m) from the sea and located in a limestone hillside, but has been destroyed by quarrying.

Although prehistoric handaxes were found in the cave, there were no human bones. Three triangular handaxes (bout coupé) suggested that the cave had been used by Neanderthals some time between 64,000 and 38,000 years BCE. These axes were made of local materials. The cave was subsequently a den for hyenas, and was described by zoologist George Rolleston, prior to his death in 1881, as "the most perfect instance of a hyena den" he had seen. Rev G N Smith, a correspondent of Charles Darwin, collected many of the bone samples from the cave. Some of the finds are now held by the National Museum of Wales and others by Carmarthenshire County Museum.
