= Castle House, Laugharne =

Mansion in Carmarthenshire, Wales

Coordinates: 51.7702°N 4.4622°W

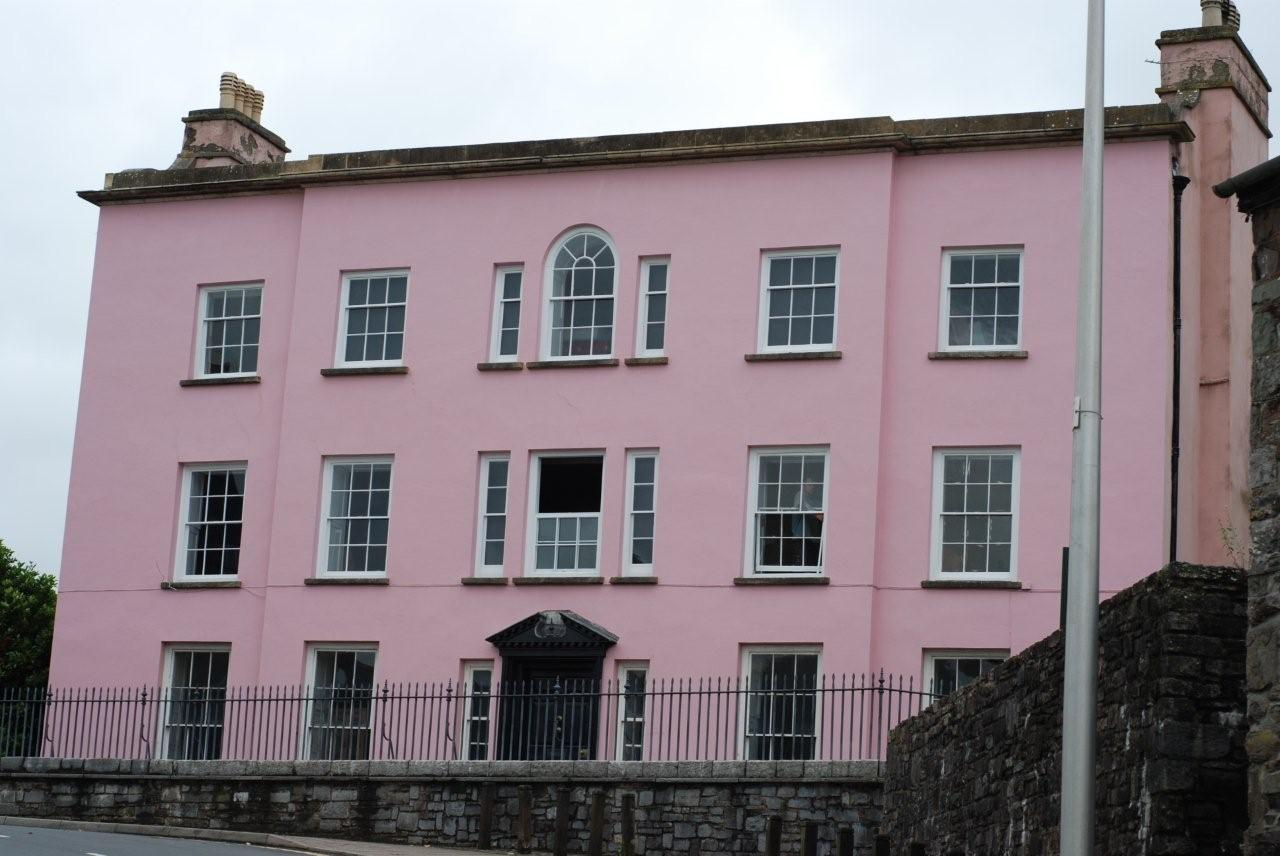
Castle House, Laugharne

Castle House in Laugharne, Carmarthenshire, Wales, is a Grade II*–listed Georgian mansion. Described by Dylan Thomas as “the best of houses in the best of places”, it is one of many buildings of note in the medieval township.

The house was built around 1730, although remodelled inside and out in the Regency period. It features a three-storey, five-bay facade, with the central three bays projecting slightly. The central doorway is surmounted by a pediment; above it are tripartite windows, with the uppermost one in the Venetian style. A broad cornice on the facade conceals the slate roof. Several wings, lower than the main body of the house, project to the rear, one of which dates to the original 18th-century construction. The interiors are mainly of the Regency period and later but include the only example in Carmarthenshire of a Chinese Chippendale staircase.

There were formerly a number of outbuildings to the rear of the house, as can be seen in the first-edition Ordnance Survey County Series map (Carmarthen, XLV.14, 1889), and the grounds of Laugharne Castle were formerly landscaped to serve as the house's garden. Two of the surviving outbuildings have been converted to a bed and breakfast and a restaurant. Although the castle is now in the guardianship of Cadw, its title is still with the house.

Until recently Castle House was in the ownership of the Starke family, who had held it since the early 19th century, although it is now the private residence of David Thomas and Abi Thomas, daughter of the local artist David Petersen. The house has long had artistic links, as Richard Hughes wrote In Hazard (1938) while living there, and Dylan Thomas wrote Portrait of the Artist as a Young Dog (1940) while staying with Hughes.
