= Great House, Laugharne =

House in Carmarthenshire, Wales

Coordinates: 51.77240°N 4.46317°W

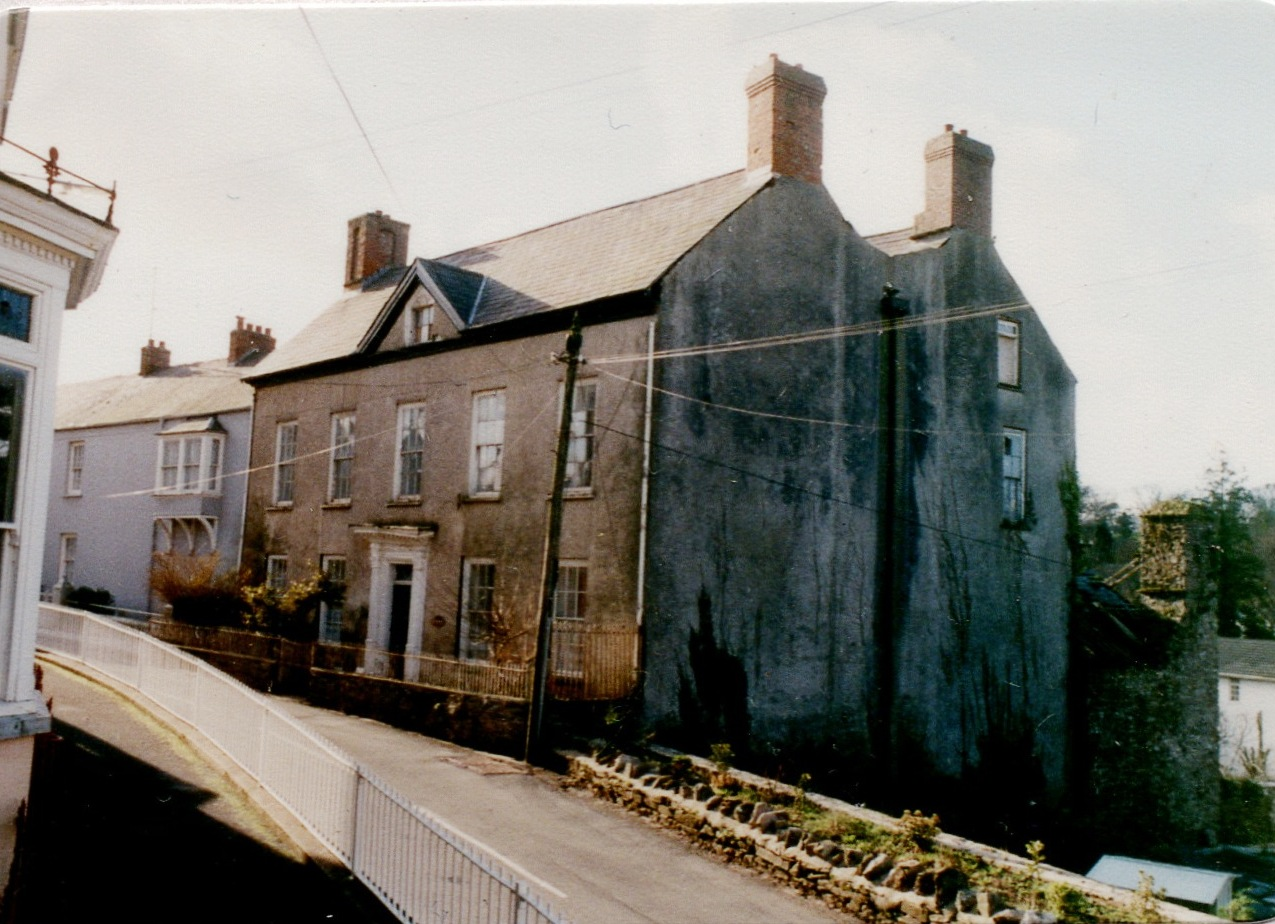
The Great House, Laugharne

The Great House in Laugharne, Carmarthenshire, Wales, is a Grade II*–listed early eighteenth century gentry residence in the Queen Anne style and is one of many buildings of note in the medieval township. The property was originally built with a central 'dog-leg' passage to the Double Pile plan with gable chimneys under two saddle roofs. Its interesting features include two carved round arches to the landing at first floor level, a small inset square-headed window to the central gable and an exceptional Baroque doorcase. The history of the house and that of its surroundings up to 1878 was chronicled by Mary Curtis.
