= Edward Falkener =

English architect and author

Edward Falkener (1814–1896) was an English architect and author.

== Life ==
Born in London on 28 February 1814, he was the son of Lyon Falkener, head of the ordnance department in the Tower of London. He was educated at a private school in Kent, and after declining a nomination for the civil service of the East India Company on the ground of delicate health, he was articled to the architect John Newman (1786–1859). He became a student of the Royal Academy in 1836, and in 1839 gained its gold medal for a design for a cathedral church.

In 1842 Falkener started on a tour of most of the countries of Europe, on through Asia Minor, Syria, Palestine, and Egypt, and visiting some of the Greek islands. He made studies of the architectural remains in the various places he visited. While in Denmark he made sketches of the palace of Frederiksberg; it was burned in 1859 and Frederick VII of Denmark asked for Falkener's original drawings, to support restoration work; the king in acknowledgment made him a knight of the Order of the Dannebrog. In 1847, while he was at Pompeii, he was allowed to excavate, at his own expense, the "House of Marcus Lucretius", a plan and description of which was given in his Museum of Classical Antiquities. The Greek inscriptions he collected during his travels were edited in 1852 by Wilhelm Henzen.

Falkener practised as architect for a few years, building some offices on St. Dunstan's Hill, London E.C., and subsequently made alterations to his house at Glanymor, Laugharne, Carmarthenshire; but spent most of his time on writing and making drawings of restorations. From 1851 to 1855 he edited the Museum of Classical Antiquities. His drawings were exhibited in Paris at the Exposition Universelle, 1855, and gained him the grande médaille d'honneur, and in 1861 he was presented with another gold medal by the king of Prussia, for his works on classical archæology.

In 1866 Falkener married, gave up private practice, and retired to Wales; but he continued studies and restorations to the time of his death, at Glanymor on 17 December 1896. He was a member of the Academy of Bologna, of the Architectural Institutes of Berlin and Rome, and was elected honorary fellow of the Royal Institute of British Architects on 2 December 1895.

== Works ==
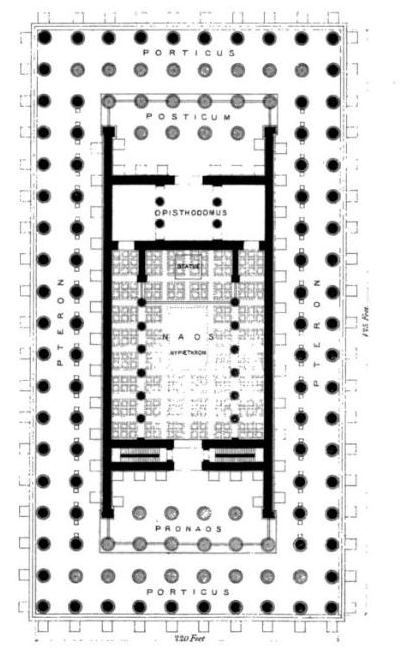
Floor plan of the Artemision of Ephesus, from Edward Falkener, Ephesus, and the Temple of Diana (1862)

In 1839 Falkener published Was the Ceiling of the Parthenon flat or curved?. He wrote on lighting for museums of sculpture, and the artificial illumination of churches and mosques. He was a supporter of the lighting of Greek temples by the hypæthron, in opposition to the views of James Fergusson and Wilhelm Dörpfeld, and published On the Hypæthron of Greek Temples (London, 1861). Some of the illustrations in Fergusson's History of Architecture were by him, and many of his sketches were published in the Architectural Publication Society's Dictionary.

Falkener published also:

- Dædalus; or, the Causes and Principles of the Excellence of Greek Sculpture, London, 1860.
- Ephesus and the Temple of Diana, 1862.
- Games, Ancient and Oriental, 1892.
- As E. F. O. Thurcastle (i.e. Edward Falkener of Thurcastle) Does the "Revised Version" affect the Doctrine of the New Testament? (1884).

He frequently contributed to the Proceedings of the Royal Institute of British Architects.

== Family ==
In 1866 Falkener married Blanche Golding Victoria, daughter of Benjamin Golding, who, with a son and three daughters, survived him on his death at Glanymor, Laugharne, Carmarthenshire, Wales on 17 Dec. 1896.
