= Island House, Laugharne =

Historic home in south west Wales

Island House
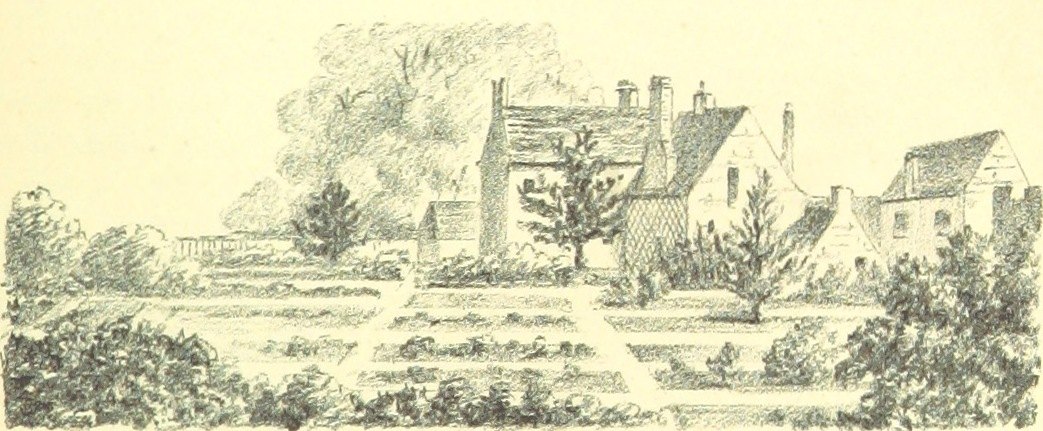
- Island House in 1856
- Interactive map of the Island House area

General information
- Coordinates: 51.7696°N 4.4634°W

Listed Building – Grade II*
- Official name: Island House
- Designated: 1986
- Reference no.: 9671

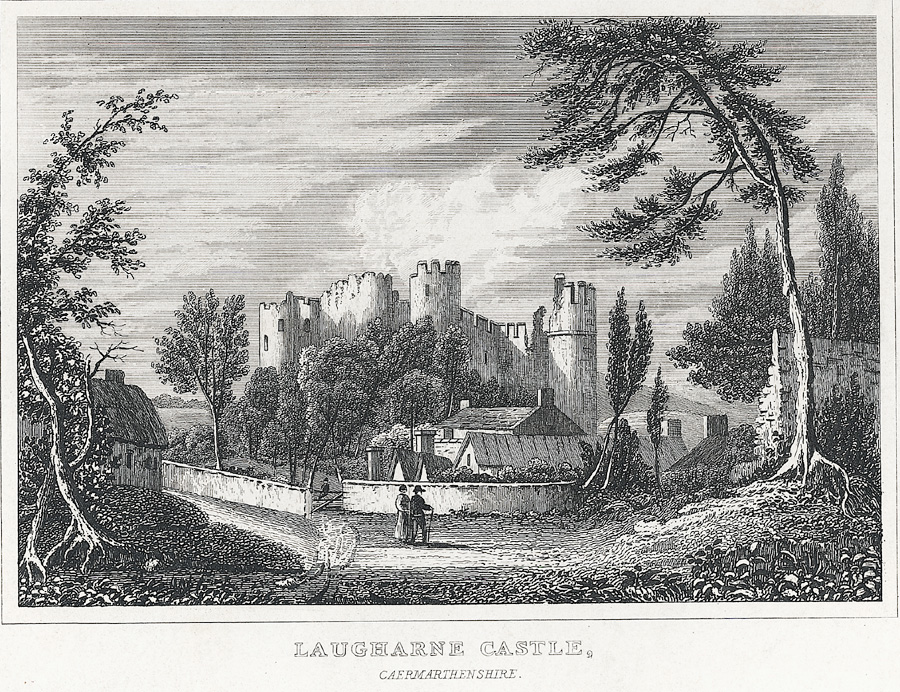
Island House in the foreground of Laugharne Castle, circa 1830, set back within its walled front garden before the present thoroughfare existed

Island House is a Grade II* listed, partly Tudor, sub-medieval townhouse located in Laugharne, Carmarthenshire, in southwest Wales. It sits below the castle between the two mouths by which the River Corran enters the Tâf estuary, known locally as "Earth Lake" and "Mill Orange". The frontage now ranges along Wogan Street but was formerly set in a walled garden. Built principally of stone, the earliest parts date from the 15th century, with additions from the 16th and 19th centuries. The grading status signifies a building of exceptional interest. There are separate listings of its garden, walls and outbuildings.

Laugharne was a seaport from the early Middle Ages and the first owners of Island House traded goods from the adjoining Gosport Harbour at the head of the Corran navigation. It could then shelter 350-ton vessels but capability slowly declined as the inlet's tidal prism was reduced by siltation at the basin entrance. Eventually an extensive saltmarsh developed across the foreshore and by 1950 the ancient channels were no longer passable and now only provide moorings for recreational craft.

== History ==
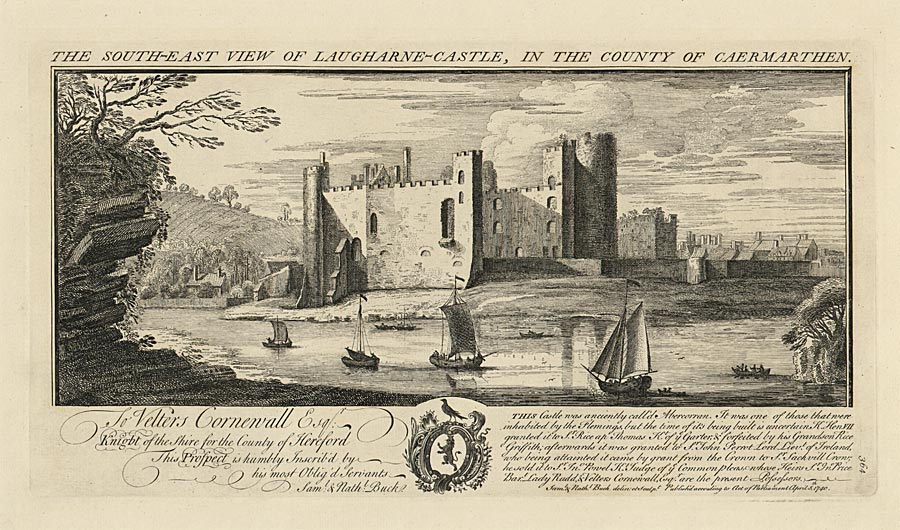
View of Island House to the left of Laugharne castle c. 1740

The first record of ownership is for Elizabeth White in 1584, widow of Thomas Rhys ap Rhydderch of Hawksbrook, and heiress of Jasper White of Laugharne, whose family held land in the parish from the 14th century and may have been the original builders of Island House. The subsequent owners have been researched in some detail. They feature members of prominent families including Vaughan of Golden Grove and Mansel of Margham along with Rhys Prydderch of Laugharne, Jasper White's great-great-grandson and High Sheriff in 1608. His son James' successor, Evan Thomas of Tremoilett, moved to Island House just before the Lordship of Laugharne was sold to Sir William Russell, who garrisoned the adjacent castle for the Royalist cause in the Wars of the Three Kingdoms.

Before the castle's surrender in November 1644 to Parliamentary forces under Major-General Rowland Laugharne its gatehouse was subject to a sustained heavy bombardment and Island House suffered significant collateral damage as a consequence. This was an unwelcome reward for its then occupant, if the following account was correct about his political affiliations:

Island House, a most ancient and interesting one, is near the castle; its walls in some parts as thick as those of the castle. The projecting part of it is properly the middle of the house; the other half, extending on the other side of it, was destroyed by accident by the cannonballs fired on the castle by Cromwell's soldiers. At that time a partisan of his was living in the house; a small part of the half now extending out from the other side of the projecting part, was destroyed; one of the balls was preserved in the house up to 1823.
– The Antiquities of Laugharne and Pendine Mary Curtis

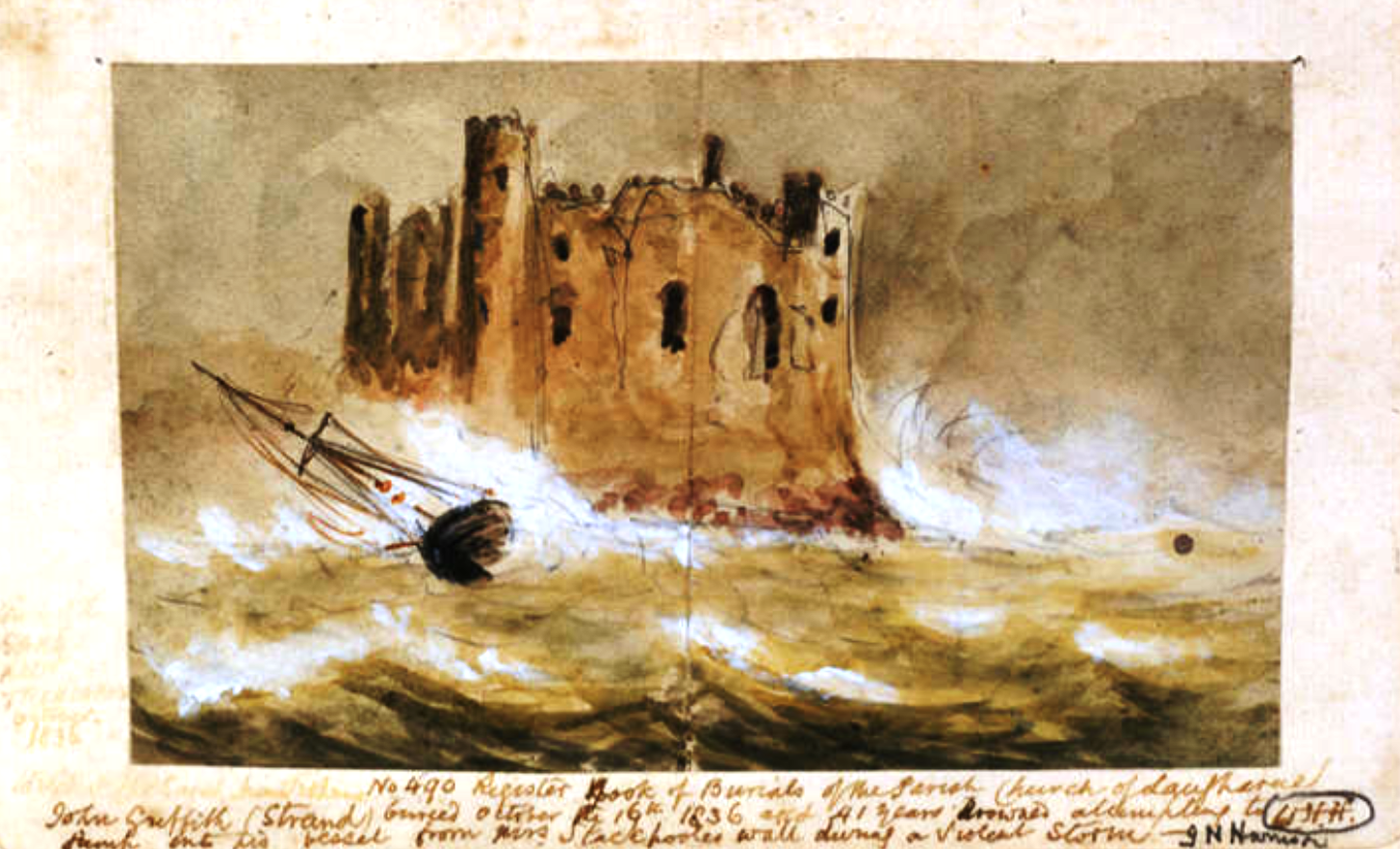
The Sarah Anne Trehearne's owner was drowned in 1836 trying to jump into his stricken vessel from the wall of Island House in a violent storm. Sketch inscribed by the Vicar of Laugharne.

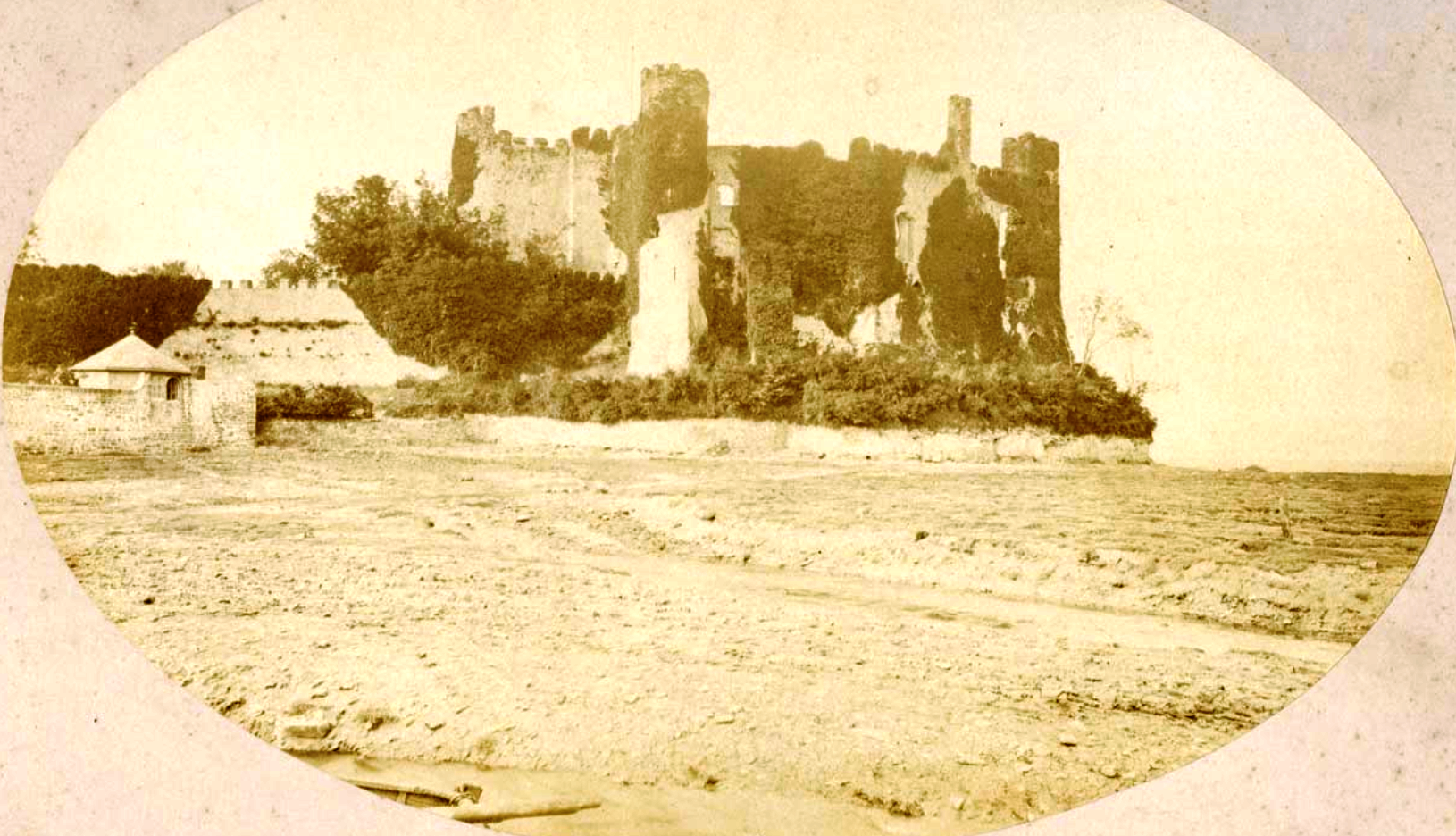
Photo of Island House in 1861 to the left of the castle with its garden and a gazebo. Then owned by Mr & Mrs Wienholt (Mary Abra Hughes Skyrme)

A date of 1658 is engraved into the lintel of the yard door, indicating some rebuilding having taken place at this time, perhaps reconstruction following the Civil War damage. Curtis also recounts the traditions of a subterranean passage connecting to the castle and of a "priest hole" hidden inside the structure which, if true, might have been inserted at this time. It may equally be of an earlier date, such refuges were built throughout the periods of religious persecution when the ap Rydderch family occupants were known to be Catholic.

A recent study has shown that Island House was passed down via a series of wealthy and often powerful owners, as a constituent part of the estate originally held by James Prydderch in 1595. Comparison of surveys spanning over three hundred years showed this group of properties remained virtually intact throughout, although was further enlarged over time. Almost all of Prydderch's township burgage plots were also inherited two hundred and fifty years later by the final nineteenth-century owner of Island House.

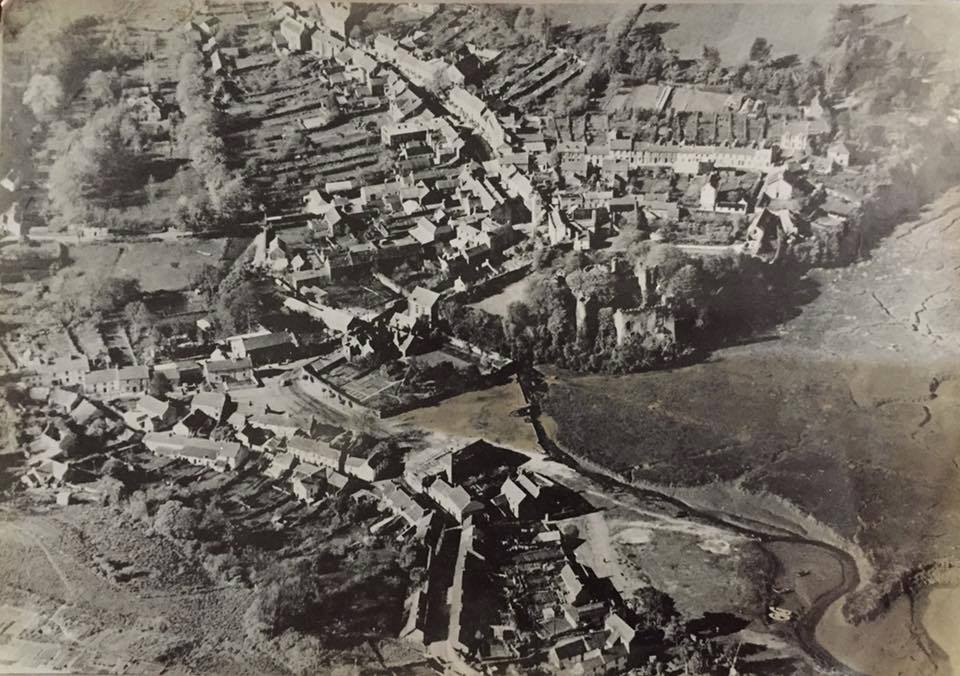
Island House and its quay shown at the head of the River Corran navigation

For a time Wogan Street was known locally as "Chandler's Hill" after three generations of the Skyrme family traded marine supplies from the site. Three of them (all called William) were elected Porteeeve; the first in 1742, his son in 1775 and grandson in 1801 who was born at Island House in 1778 and died there in 1823. It remained the home of his wife Mary and her second husband George Stackpoole, who predeceased her. She died in 1856 and the property passed to her daughter Mary Abra Hughes (1813–1885), the last of the Skyrme line, who in 1858 at the age of 45 married Frederick Wienholt also of Laugharne. Mary's accounts book for 1835–1836 records the cost of taking a sedan chair to an assembly at The Globe Inn, only 100 yards from Island House, which speaks to both the community's prosperity and her own affluent lifestyle at that time. It was during this period the rear service wings were added to the house. By 1871 a reverse in the township's fortunes was noted, reflecting the decline in its harbour traffic which was further accelerated by the arrival of the railway at nearby St Clears in 1854, a direct competitor to the sea-carrying trade:

As for Laugharne, nearly all the wealthy and ancient families are gone. About forty to fifty years ago every large house was occupied by parties with handsome incomes, the smaller ones by persons of great respectability and of some property. Laugharne then presented a lively scene, the carriages of the rich rolled by its houses...Parties often concluded the day. Malkin, who was here in 1803, said it was the best built town in Carmarthenshire.
– Introduction to Laugharne Cambrian Archaeological Association

Interior & exterior views circa 1900

Nonetheless, in the census of that same year Mary's household still includes a resident dressmaker, three domestic servants, and a coachman/groom. Later returns from 1881 to 1911 show that the property continued to provide a prestigious, 20-room home for well-to-do families. Even in the years of economic recession and profound social change which followed WW1, two full-time gardeners were still employed by retired Indian Army major, Claude Vivyan Congreve, who took up residence at the turn of the century and died in 1923. His widow Mary, an accomplished musician, was responsible for organising monthly dances, concerts raising funds for the church, dramatic productions and indeed most of the town's entertainment between the wars according to her neighbour Lt Colonel R. A. Tucker, whose mother had accompanied the Congreve family when they moved to Laugharne from London.

== Present Day ==
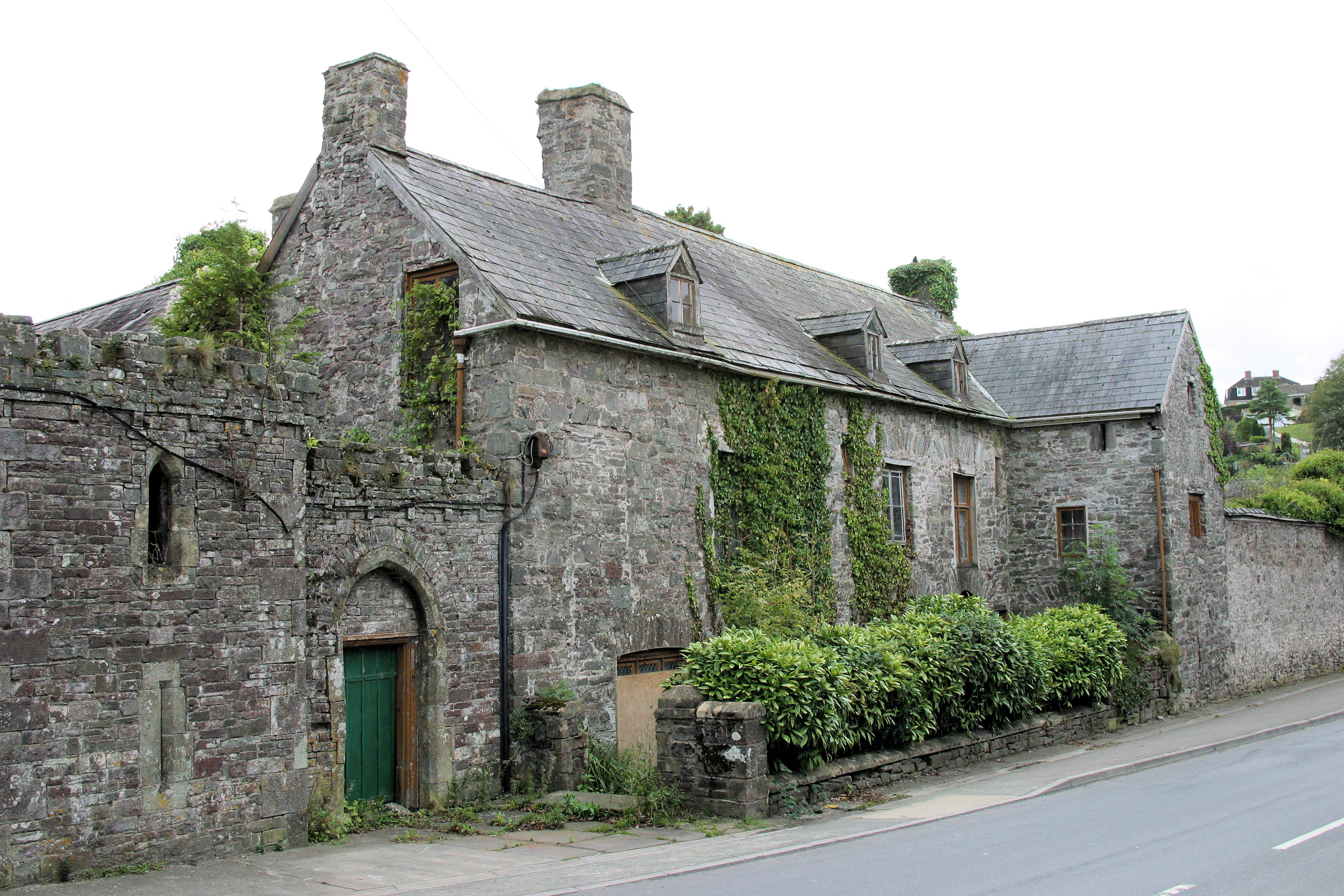
Island House, Laugharne in 2011

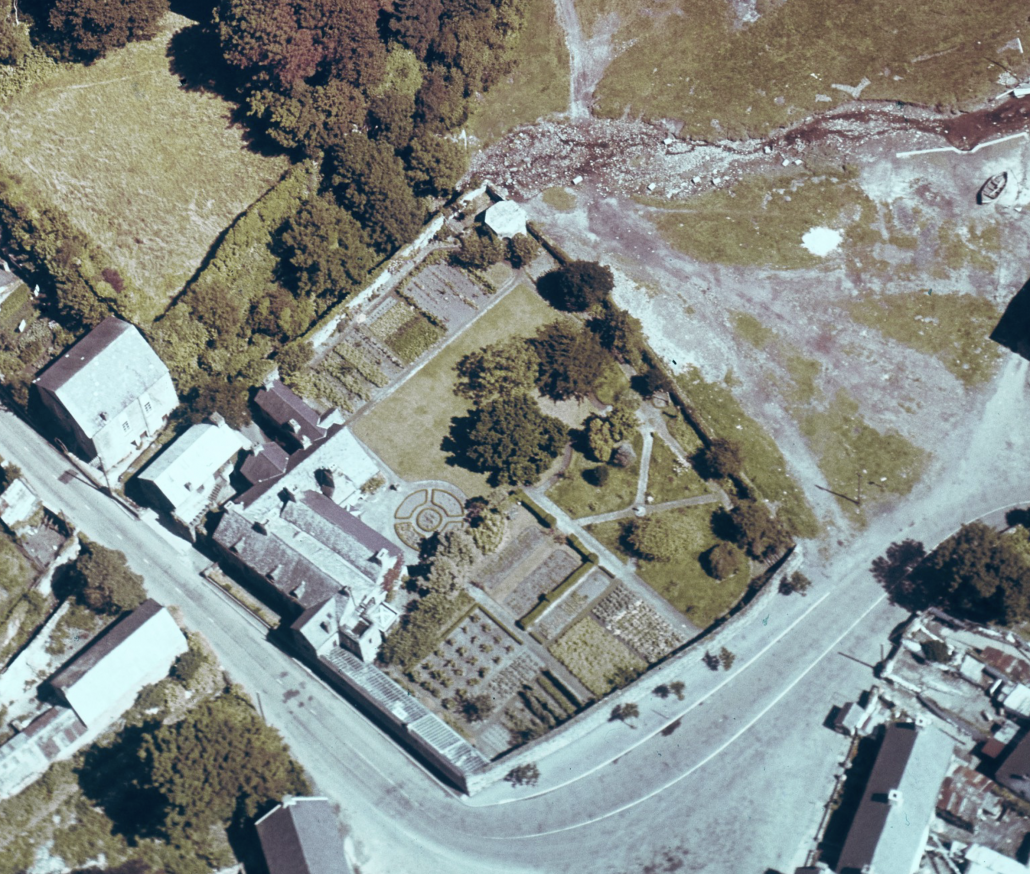
Aerial view of Island House in 1949

Caleb Rees, writer and Deputy Chief Inspector of Schools for Wales, lived in the property from 1943 until his death in 1970. His wife Dr Laura Rees was Medical Officer to the Welsh Board of Health. Their gardens continued to be a venue for social and charitable events in the heart of the township throughout that period.

The later twentieth century was not so kind to the buildings, which steadily deteriorated. After the owner died in 2004 it remained empty and has lain more or less derelict in recent times. Safety concerns led the County Council to consider a Compulsory Purchase order in 2015 after several years on the "at risk" register.

In 2019 a public campaign was launched to save Island House, by then on the brink of serious and imminent collapse. It was acquired by new owners in 2020 who immediately shored up the structure and began a major restoration project planned to bring the property back to its original condition and into a new use.

== Sources ==
- Jones, Francis (1997). "Island House". Historic Carmarthenshire Homes & Their Families (2nd ed.). Brawdy Books. p. 98. ISBN 0952834413. "A fine sketch of the house, made in 1856, was produced in Curtis"
- Roche, John (1993). "Roman Pembrokeshire". Journal of the Pembrokeshire Historical Society. 5: 9.
- Taylor, Duncan (2009). The Maritime Trade of the Smaller Bristol Channel Ports in the Sixteenth Century (PDF) (Thesis). University of Bristol. pp. 168–215. S2CID 165505444. Archived from the original (PDF) on 28 February 2020.
- Lewis, E.A. (1927). The Welsh Port Books, 1550–1603, with an analysis of the customs revenue accounts of Wales for the same period. Vol. XLVII. London: Cymmrodorion Record Series Number 12. p. 316.
- Stopp, Peter (2017). "Island House". The Carmarthenshire Antiquary. 53.
- Meyrick, S. R., ed. (1846). Lewys Dwnn: Heraldic Visitations of Wales 1586–1613. London: Longman. p. 129.
- Avent, Richard (1987). The siege of Laugharne Castle from 28 October to 3 November 1644 in Castles in Wales and the Marches. Cardiff: University of Wales Press.
- Curtis, Mary (1880). The Antiquities of Laugharne, Pendine & Their Neighbourhoods (2nd ed.). London: R. Clay.
- Jones, Francis (1967). "The Society of Sea Serjeants". Trans. Hon. Society of Cymmrodorion. 53: 342.
- Howell, David W. (1986). Patriarchs and Parasites:The Gentry of S.W. Wales in the Eighteenth Century. UWP. p. 20.
- Williams, E.V. (1963). History of Laugharne Corporation: Charter & Portreeves. Narberth & Tenby: H.G. Walters. p. 5.
- Jones, Francis (1937). "The Squires of Hawksbrook". Trans. Hon. Society of Cymmrodorion. 53: 342.
- Randall, Alan (1997). "Recusancy in Carmarthenshire". The Carmarthenshire Antiquary. XXXIII: 64.
- Thomas, Spencer (1986). "The Descent of the Lordships of Laugharne and Eglwyscummin: Norman Marcher Lordships in South-West Carms". The Carmarthenshire Antiquary. 6: 42.
- Eyre Evans, Geo (1937). "A Laugharne Lady's Account Book A.D. 1835–1836". The Carmarthenshire Antiquary. XXIII: 29–30.
- Williams, Prof. David (1948). "Introduction to Laugharne". Archaeologia Cambrensis. 100: 134.
- Tyler, R. H.; et al. (1985) [1925]. Laugharne: Local History and Folklore. Llandysul: Gomer Press. ISBN 9780863831546.
- Tucker, J. A. G. (1988). Yesteryear: Laugharne in the Inter War Years. Laugharne Corporation. p. 20.
- Will of John Hughes NLW SD/1729/86
- Will of Samuel Hughes, NLW SD/1732/21
- Will of Zacharias Thomas, Gent., NLW SD/1681/60
