= William Thomas David =

British Professor

W.T. David
- Born: William Thomas David; 19 April 1886; Laugharne, Carmarthenshire, Wales
- Died: 29 May 1948 (aged 62); Leeds, Yorkshire, England
- Citizenship: British
- Awards: Thomas Hawksley Gold Medallist:1937; Starley Premium Recipient:1941; Dugald Clerk Prize Winner:1941
- Scientific career
- Fields: Engineering
- Workplaces: University College Cardiff; Trinity College, Cambridge; University of Liverpool

W.T. David M.A., Sc.D (19 April 1886 – 29 May 1948) was Professor of Engineering at Liverpool University from 1922 to 1948 and from 1920 to 1922 at University College, Cardiff in Wales. His pioneering doctoral research under Professor Bertram Hopkinson at Trinity College, Cambridge into flame gas phenomena anticipated and was confirmed by later developments in quantum mechanics and David became an established authority on gaseous explosions in combustion engines. During WW1 he served as an Army Major (Research and Inspection) and in 1915 was appointed Director in the Ministry of Munitions and in 1918 Inspector of Technical Schools in the Ministry of Education. David was a member of the Institutions of Civil and of Mechanical Engineers, and was chairman of the Yorkshire Association of the Institution of Civil Engineers for the session 1928-29. He died in 1948.

== Selected bibliography ==
- David, W. T. (1926). "Radiation in gaseous explosions". Transactions of the Faraday Society. 22: 273. doi:10.1039/TF9262200273.
- DAVID, W. T.; MANN, J. (October 1942). "Influence of Water Vapour on Flame Gas Temperatures". Nature. 150 (3809): 521–522. Bibcode:1942Natur.150..521D. doi:10.1038/150521b0. S2CID 4104150.
- David, W.T.; Jordan, J. (3 April 2009). "XIII. Flame temperatures in carbon-monoxide and air mixtures". The London, Edinburgh, and Dublin Philosophical Magazine and Journal of Science. 17 (110): 172–181. doi:10.1080/14786443409462378.
- DAVID, W. T.; PUGH, B. (June 1940). "Latent Energy and Dissociation in Flame Gases". Nature. 145 (3684): 896–897. Bibcode:1940Natur.145..896D. doi:10.1038/145896a0. S2CID 4140035.
- DAVID, W. T.; MANN, J. (October 1942). "Influence of Water Vapour on Flame Gas Temperatures". Nature. 150 (3809): 521–522. Bibcode:1942Natur.150..521D. doi:10.1038/150521b0. S2CID 4104150.
- DAVID, W. T. (September 1943). "Temperature of Flame Gases". Nature. 152 (3853): 278. Bibcode:1943Natur.152..278D. doi:10.1038/152278a0.
- DAVID, W. T.; MANN, J. (August 1947). "Unusual Flame Gases". Nature. 160 (4059): 229–230. Bibcode:1947Natur.160..229D. doi:10.1038/160229b0. S2CID 4089445.
