= Portreeve =

English official

A portreeve (Old English: hæfenrēfa, sometimes spelt port-reeve) or port warden is the title of a historical official in England and Wales possessing authority (political, administrative, or fiscal) over a town. The details of the office have fluctuated and evolved considerably over time. The term derives from the word port (which historically meant a market town or walled town, and not specifically a seaport); and the word reeve, meaning a high-ranking supervisory official.

The origins of the position are in the reign of Edward the Elder (c. 874 – 17 July 924), who, in order to ensure that taxes were correctly exacted, forbade the conducting of trades outside of a 'port' or duly appointed place for trading, and without the supervision of a portreeve or other trustworthy person. At this time, therefore, they had a role as a fiscal supervisor, much like modern customs and revenue officers.

By the late Middle Ages, portreeves acted as representatives of the people to ensure that their duties to the mayor and community were fulfilled. In some cases (and usually more recently) the role has been combined with that of mayor. Portreeves may also have acted as returning officers at elections.

Contemporary British towns which still nominally have or appoint a portreeve include Aberavon, Glamorgan; Laugharne, Carmarthenshire; Ashburton, Devon (the only town in the country where the office was exempted from abolition by the Administration of Justice Act 1977, and is still held); Kingsbridge, Devon; Beccles, Suffolk; Callington, Cornwall (where the name is given to the council chairman); and Yeovil, Somerset.
