= Caleb Rees =

Welsh school inspector and writer (1883–1970)

Caleb Rees

Caleb Rees (1883–1970) was a Welsh school inspector for over forty years and a writer on educational and ecclesiastical topics.

== Life ==
He was born at "Esgairordd", in Whitchurch, Pembrokeshire, the son of Jacob and Mary Rees. His career started after the 'crucible years' of legislation establishing universal education in Wales and his major achievements coincided with the period when LEAs had taken control of all schools following their creation by the Education Act 1902. It was as a beneficiary of the earlier 1889 Intermediate Education Act, pre-dating similar legislation in England by a dozen years, that he received his education at Port Talbot Intermediate School and from which he won a scholarship to University College in 1899. He matriculated with first class honours in 1902 winning the Gladstone Memorial Prize Rees went on to gain the Withers Prize at the University of Manchester before returning to Wales as lecturer in education at Cardiff and gaining an M.A. there in 1909.

In 1912 Rees was appointed as one of Her Majesty's inspectors of schools and thereafter spent over forty years in post, responsible initially for Brecon, Monmouth and Newport. Throughout this period he wrote extensively on the theory and practice of education including articles on teaching Welsh in schools. After three years service in the RNVR during World War I he became a leading authority on teacher training as inspector of training colleges and university training departments. Later, as deputy Chief Inspector for Wales, he was an influential national representative advising many governing bodies at county level on a wide range of technical issues. In 1922 he married Dr Laura Powell, Medical Officer to the Welsh Board of Health and they made their home in Newport.

At the outbreak of World War II Rees succeeded Sir Robert Webber as M.O.I Director for Wales but in 1943, after ill health obliged him to reduce his workload, he moved to Island House, Laugharne. From that ancient building, even in later semi-retirement, he continued to conduct selection interviews for ex-servicemen and graduates seeking entry into the teaching profession and also wrote several works on ecclesiastical history. He was named after his famous great-grandfather Caleb Morris of where he was himself elected honorary Deacon and about which he co-authored a history with his brother Stephen in 1959.

== Sources ==
- Betts, C. (2001). WEBBER, Sir ROBERT JOHN (1884–1962), Managing Director of Western Mail and Echo Limited. Dictionary of Welsh Biography.
- Dalgleish, Neil (1996). Education Policy Making in England and Wales: The Crucible Years 1895–1911. Woburn Education.
- James, M.A. (2001). REES, Caleb (1883–1970), inspector of Schools and author. Dictionary of Welsh Biography.
- Lloyd, Prof. Sir J.E., ed. (1939). History of Carmarthenshire. Vol. 2. p. 401.
- Owen, J. D. (1959). MORRIS, CALEB (1800–1865), Congregational minister. Dictionary of Welsh Biography.
- "Caleb Rees Press Notices". archive.org. Perrotts in Wales. 1937–1943.
- Rees, Caleb and Stephen (1959). Penygroes, Ty Cwrdd Annibynwyr Blaenau bro Nan-hyfer: Gyrfa Dwy Ganrif – English version: Pen-y-groes, Pembrokeshire, The Story of Two Centuries, (1967). Oldham.
