= A High Wind in Jamaica (novel) =

1929 novel by Richard Hughes

- First edition
- Author: Richard Hughes
- Language: English
- Publisher: Chatto and Windus
- Publication date: 1929
- Publication place: United Kingdom
- Media type: Print (Hardcover)
- Pages: 283 pp

A High Wind in Jamaica is a 1929 novel by the Welsh writer Richard Hughes, which was made into a film of the same name in 1965. Hughes's first novel, it was set in the late nineteenth century and followed a group of seven children captured by pirates on a voyage from Jamaica. A critical success as well as a bestseller on its first publication in Britain, it was awarded the Prix Femina Vie-Heureuse in 1932.

The work has entered the public domain as of January 1, 2025.

== Plot ==
The Bas-Thornton children — John the oldest, ten-year-old Emily, Edward, Rachel, and Laura, aged three— are raised on a plantation in Jamaica at an unspecified time after the emancipation of slaves in the British Empire (1834). The grand mansions occupied by slave-holders are mostly breaking down, but it is a time of technological transformation, with sailing ships and steamers coexisting on the high seas. A high wind destroys their home, and the parents decide the children must leave the island and to return to their original home in England. Accompanied by two Creole children from Jamaica, thirteen-year-old Margaret Fernandez and her younger brother Harry, they leave on the Clorinda, a merchant ship under the command of Captain Marpole. Shortly after leaving Jamaica, the Clorinda is seized by pirates.

The pirates first pretend they need to seize the ship's cargo and will refund the price of the goods taken, but when the lie becomes obvious, they menace Captain Marpole by threatening to shoot the children if he does not disclose where the Clorinda's safe is kept. The ship is ransacked, and the children are brought aboard the pirate schooner to get dinner. Captain Marpole, thinking that under cover of darkness the children have been murdered, flees the scene, unknowingly abandoning the children to the pirates. Marpole writes a letter to Mr and Mrs Thornton informing them that their children have been murdered by the pirates.

The children quickly become part of life aboard the pirate ship and treat it as their new home. For the most part they are regarded with indifference, although a few crew members — little José and Otto the chief mate — care for and become fond of them, and Captain Jonsen, the pirate captain himself, becomes very fond of Emily.

The pirates stop at their home base of Santa Lucia — in current-day province Pinar del Río, Cuba — to sell the seized goods. Captain Jonsen tries unsuccessfully to convince a rich woman to take care of the children. During the night, José takes John, Edward, and Margaret ashore, and John accidentally falls to his death in a warehouse. He is immediately and deliberately forgotten by his own siblings. The pirate captain seems to be the last one to forget him.

While drunk, Captain Jonsen makes a sexual overture to Emily. She bites his hand before anything happens, but she is frightened by the look in Jonsen's eye as he reaches for her. The author gives no explicit details for her fright, just a veiled description from Emily's point of view. Emily later suffers an injury to her leg, in an accident caused by Rachel, and is confined to the captain's cabin. Meanwhile, Margaret, who has become alienated from the other children, becomes Otto's lover and moves into his cabin.

Having made no further captures, the pirates quickly take the first ship they finally see, a Dutch vessel transporting some wild animals. The captain of this ship is tied up and left in the cabin with Emily. Everyone else on the pirate ship boards the Dutch vessel to watch a fight between a disinterested lion and tiger. The Dutch captain does all he can to get Emily to free him but is unable to communicate with her. Finally seeing a knife he rolls towards it. Emily, injured and terrified, screams but no one hears. She pounces at the last second and stabs the captain several times. He soon dies. Margaret witnesses this event. When the crew returns to the ship, some of the pirates mistake Margaret for the murderer and without ceremony throw her overboard, but she is rescued by other pirates heading back to the ship.

By this point the crew has grown tired of and scared of the children. Jonsen arranges for them to transfer to a passing steamer. Disguised as a British merchant vessel, the captain claims that some pirates abandoned the children on the Cuban shore and that he then picked them up to bring them to England. Before sending them on board the steamer, Otto instructs Emily not to disclose the truth about what has happened to them in the past months. He chooses Emily rather than Margaret, as the latter seems to have lost her sanity.

Once aboard the steamer, the children are delighted with the boat's luxury and the loving treatment by the passengers, who know of the story of the children told by Captain Marpole. Despite her fondness for Captain Jonsen and the fact that she promised not to tell about what really happened, Emily quickly tells the truth to a stewardess. The pirate ship is pursued and seized by the British authorities.

Back in London, the children are reintegrated into their families. They seem completely unaffected by their traumatic experiences aboard the ship, apart from Margaret who has lost her sanity. (It is hinted that she may also be pregnant.) Emily is only half aware of the crime she has committed. The younger children have distorted and contradictory memories of the facts, and after unsuccessfully attempting to extract any information from them, the family solicitor decides that only Emily should testify at the trial against the pirate crew and then only to repeat a statement written by him. Under the pressure of the courtroom, Emily breaks down and cries out that the Dutch captain died as she watched. She does not exactly say who performed the murder, but at the trial's outcome the pirates are convicted of the murder and later are executed.

The book ends with Emily playing with her schoolmates. She is so similar to them that "only God", but no one else, could tell them apart.

== Development and publication history ==
The idea for the novel came in 1925, when a family friend introduced Hughes to an unpublished manuscript by one Jeanette Calder. This was a record of her personal experiences in 1822, off the coast of Cuba, as one of a group of children on a brig captured by pirates. Hughes was struck by the fact that the pirates, despite holding the children as hostages in an attempt to extort money from the ship’s captain, treated them with kindness and consideration. To research the historical background, he read as widely as he could on Caribbean piracy in the nineteenth century. He was also able to draw on his mother’s experience of growing up in Jamaica; at this time, Hughes himself had never been there. Finally, having no children himself, he ‘borrowed’ other people’s in order to study child psychology: these included Charlotte Williams-Ellis (daughter of Hughes’ friend and editor, the writer Amabel Williams-Ellis.

Hughes continued to work on the novel over the next three years. In 1928, he offered the first chapter to the editor of the magazine The Forum, Henry Goddard Leach. Accepting it for publication, Leach wrote to Hughes, saying that he liked his “high wind in Jamaica”. Hughes was taken by the phrase, and thus “High Wind in Jamaica” became the title of the chapter published in The Forum in December 1928.

The complete novel was first published in the United States (where Hughes was living at the time) on March 13, 1929, under the title The Innocent Voyage. It was while Hughes was on his way back to Britain that the novel was first published there, in a slightly abbreviated form, and now titled A High Wind in Jamaica. This was in the magazine Life and Letters, where it was introduced by the editor Desmond MacCarthy as “a work of unusual merit and originality”. The book version, published by Chatto and Windus, appeared in September 1929 under the same title, which was then used for most subsequent American editions as well.

== Critical reception ==
A High Wind in Jamaica was received with enthusiasm on its initial British publication. It was praised by eminent writers and critics such as Arnold Bennett and Hugh Walpole, who wrote that the novel "has genius because it sees something that a million people have seen before, but sees it uniquely." Hughes' powers of description came in for particular acclaim. At the same time, however, there was some unease at Hughes' portrayal of the children and controversy about his understanding of child psychology, with critics such as Humbert Wolfe and J. E. S. Arrowsmith among those unconvinced. An extensive correspondence took place in Time and Tide; the headmistress of a school in Bath objected to the novel as "a disgusting travesty of child life."

The novel has since been described as "one of the classic novels of childhood and a completely original work." It is often given credit for influencing and paving the way for novels such as Lord of the Flies by William Golding. In 1998, A High Wind in Jamaica was included as number 71 in the Modern Library's 100 Best Novels, a list of the best English-language novels of the 20th century.

== Adaptations ==
The novel was adapted for the stage as The Innocent Voyage in 1943, as a play in three acts by Paul Osborn.

The novel was filmed in 1965 as A High Wind in Jamaica, directed by Alexander Mackendrick and starring Anthony Quinn as Chavez. The cast also included a young Martin Amis, who described the original novel as "a thrillingly good book” in his autobiography.

A High Wind in Jamaica has also been adapted several times for radio:

- NBC University Theatre broadcast a one-hour version by Jane Speed in 1950.
- Hughes’s own six-part serial appeared on the BBC Home Service in August and September 1953.
- In 2000, the BBC produced a new dramatised adaptation in two parts, written by Bryony Lavery and broadcast on BBC Radio 4.
