= Richard Hughes (British writer) =

Writer (1900–1976)

- Hughes in 1971
- Born: Richard Arthur Warren Hughes; April 19, 1900; Weybridge, Surrey, England
- Died: April 28, 1976 (aged 76); Ynys, Gwynedd, Wales
- Education: Oriel College
- Occupations: Novelist, poet, playwright
- Spouse: Frances Hughes (m. 1932)
- Children: 5
- Writing career
- Years active: 1917–1976
- Notable work: A High Wind in Jamaica

Richard Arthur Warren Hughes (19 April 1900 – 28 April 1976) was a writer of poems, short stories, novels and plays.

== Biography ==
He was born in Weybridge, Surrey. His father was Arthur Hughes, a civil servant, and his mother, Louisa Grace Warren, had been brought up in the West Indies in Jamaica. He was educated first at Charterhouse School and graduated from Oriel College, Oxford in 1922.

A Charterhouse schoolmaster had sent Hughes's first published work to the magazine The Spectator in 1917. The article, written as a school essay, was an unfavourable criticism of The Loom of Youth, by Alec Waugh, a recently published novel which caused a furore for its account of homosexual passions between British schoolboys in a public school. At Oxford, he met Robert Graves, also an Old Carthusian, and they co-edited a poetry publication, Oxford Poetry, in 1921. Hughes's short play The Sisters' Tragedy was being staged in the West End of London at the Royal Court Theatre by 1922. He was the author of the world's first radio play, A Comedy Of Danger, commissioned from him for the BBC by Nigel Playfair and broadcast on 15 January 1924.

Hughes was employed as a journalist and travelled widely before he married the painter Frances Bazley (1905–1985) in 1932. They settled for a period in Norfolk and then in 1934 at Castle House, Laugharne in South Wales. Dylan Thomas stayed with Hughes and wrote his book Portrait of the Artist as a Young Dog whilst living at Castle House. Hughes was instrumental in Thomas relocating permanently to the area.

He wrote only four novels, the most famous of which is The Innocent Voyage (1929), or A High Wind in Jamaica, as Hughes renamed it soon after its initial publication. Set in the 19th century, it explores the events which follow the accidental capture of a group of English children by pirates: the children are revealed as considerably more amoral than the pirates (it was in this novel that Hughes first described the cocktail Hangman's Blood). In 1938, he wrote an allegorical novel, In Hazard, based on the true story of the S.S. Phemius, which was caught in the 1932 Cuba hurricane for four days during its maximum intensity. He wrote volumes of children's stories, including The Spider's Palace.

During the war, Hughes had a desk job in the Admiralty. He met the architects Jane Drew and Maxwell Fry, whose children stayed with the Hughes family for much of that time. After the end of the war, he spent ten years writing scripts for Ealing Studios, and published no more novels until 1961. Of the trilogy The Human Predicament, only the first two volumes, The Fox in the Attic (1961) and The Wooden Shepherdess (1973), were complete when he died; twelve chapters, less than 50 pages, of the final volume are now published. In these, he describes the course of European history from the 1920s through World War II, including real characters and events—such as Hitler's escape after the abortive Munich putsch—as well as fictional.

Later in life, Hughes relocated to Ynys in Gwynedd. He was churchwarden of Llanfihangel-y-traethau, the village church, where he was buried when he died at home in 1976.

Hughes was a Fellow of the Royal Society of Literature and, in the United States, an honorary member of both the National Institute of Arts and Letters and the American Academy of Arts and Letters. He was awarded the OBE (Officer of the Order of the British Empire) in 1946.

== Family ==
Richard and Frances Hughes had five children. Their second child, Penelope Hughes, published a memoir, Richard Hughes: Author, Father, in 1984.

== Works ==
=== Novels ===
- A High Wind in Jamaica (1929)
- In Hazard. A Sea Story (1938)
- The Human Predicament:
  - Volume 1: The Fox in the Attic (1962)
  - Volume 2: The Wooden Shepherdess (1973)

=== Poetry ===
- Gypsy-Night and other poems (1922)
- Confessio Juvenis: Collected Poems (1926)

=== Plays ===
- The Sisters' Tragedy (1922)
- Danger: a Play (1924)
- A Comedy of Good and Evil (1924)
- The Man Born to be Hanged (1924)
- The Sisters' Tragedy, and Three Other Plays (1924)

=== Short story collections ===
- A Moment of Time (1926)
- In the Lap of Atlas: Stories of Morocco (1979)

=== Stories for children ===
- The Spider’s Palace and Other Stories (1931)
- Don’t Blame Me! and Other Stories (1940)
- Gertrude’s Child (1966)
- The Wonder Dog: Collected Children’s Stories (1977)

=== Criticism ===
- John Skelton: Poems (1924, editor)
- Fiction as Truth: Selected Literary Writings of Richard Hughes (1983)

=== Screenplays ===
- A Run for Your Money (1949) (with Clifford Evans, Leslie Norman, Diana Morgan and Charles Frend)
- The Divided Heart (1954) (with Jack Whittingham)

Hughes also ghost-wrote The Story of the Lyric Theatre, Hammersmith (1925) for Nigel Playfair, and collaborated with J. D. Scott on an official government publication, The Administration of War Production (1955).
