= Irene Hayes =

American florist and actress

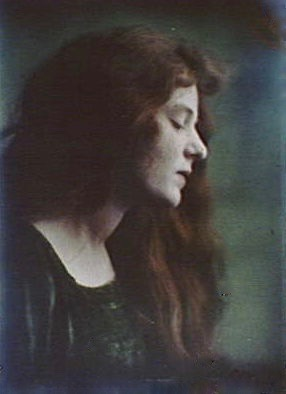
- Born: September 28, 1895; Pawtucket, Rhode Island
- Died: September 16, 1975 (aged 79); New York City, U.S.
- Occupations: Stage actress, businesswoman
- Spouses: Robert Taber; Warner F. Russell; Jack Solomon

Irene Hayes (born Lillie Irene Leslie Hayes, September 28, 1895 – September 16, 1975) was an American florist and musical theatre actress. Born in Pawtucket, Rhode Island, she grew up in Manhattan, Salina, Kansas and Kansas City, Missouri. She made her Broadway debut as a chorus girl in Miss 1917, and subsequently appeared in the Broadway revues The Love Mill and the Ziegfeld Follies in 1918.

Hayes abandoned her career as a Ziegfeld girl to become a businesswoman. She established her own florist business, Irene Hayes, Inc., in Manhattan in 1920 on Park Avenue. By 1929 she had gained a national reputation as one of America's leading woman florists who catered to New York's elite society. She opened multiple stores in New York City, and had a large number of celebrity clients. In 1960 her business merged with Wadley & Smythe, Inc. to form Irene Hayes Wadley & Smythe, Inc. That business later merged again to form Irene Hayes Wadley & Smythe Lemoult, Inc. Hayes was married three times. Her third husband, the restaurateur Jack Solomon, owned Gallagher's Steakhouse, which she inherited upon his death in 1963. She sold it to Jeff Brody in 1964. She died in 1975.

== Early life ==
The daughter of Edward Hayes and Laura S. L. Hayes (née Whitehead), Lillie Irene Leslie Hayes was born on September 28, 1895 in Pawtucket, Rhode Island. Her parents had immigrated to the United States from England, and by the time of the 1900 United States Federal Census the family was living in Manhattan. She had one sister, Marjorie. The 1905 New York State Census states her father was employed as the manager of an automobile business in New York City. At the time of the 1910 United States Federal Census the Hayes family was living in Salina, Kansas. Irene spent time living Kansas City, Missouri before moving back to New York City with the hopes of becoming a film actress.

== Career ==
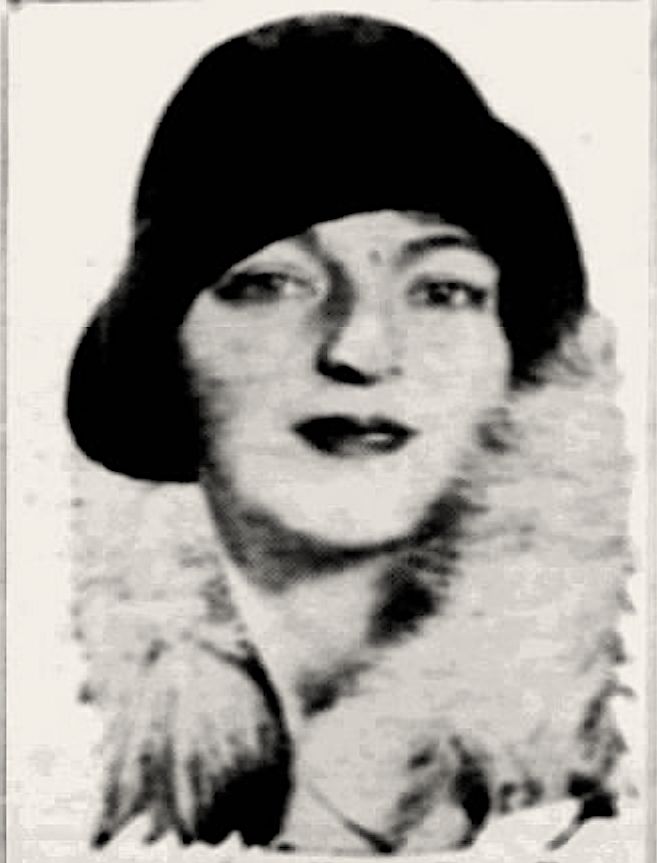
Irene Hayes in 1930.

Hayes made her Broadway debut in November 1917 at the Century Theatre in Guy Bolton and P. G. Wodehouse's musical revue Miss 1917; a show which was co-produced by Charles Dillingham and Florenz Ziegfeld, Jr.. After this show closed in January 1918, she returned to Broadway the following month as Mrs. Vandermill in the premiere of Alfred Francis and Earl Carroll's musical The Love Mill at the 48th Street Theatre.

At the time of her marriage to her first husband, the actor Robert Taber, on August 16, 1918 Hayes was working as a Ziegfeld girl in the Ziegfeld Follies. Her marriage to Taber did not last, and she married her second husband, Warner F. Russell, on April 14, 1928; a wealthy stock broker in New York whom she successfully sued for divorce in Chicago in 1930.

In her early life in New York Hayes worked a number of odd jobs, including working as an automobile salesman and as an employee in a florist shop. In 1920 she opened her own florist business , Irene Hayes, Inc., at 799 Park Avenue at the intersection with 74th Street. The shop became a favorite among the New York elite, and in 1926 she opened a second location in Manhattan at 277 47th Street. By 1929 she was described by Southern Florist and Nurseryman magazine as the "foremost woman florist in the country".

Hayes's floral business had a large number of celebrity clients, and she was described as a famous florist in national magazines like Life. Her organization merged with other florist businesses, becoming Irene Hayes Wadley & Smythe, Inc. in 1960, and later Irene Hayes Wadley & Smythe Lemoult, Inc. In 1970 she opened a third location in New York City at 470 58th Street. Her opinions on flowers were quoted in publications, including the following from The New York Times:

"The right flowers do a lot of good and the wrong ones work mischief," she would often say. "I honestly believe that flowers, or rather the lack of them, have the power to change the map of the world. Do you think Nero would have burned Rome if he had been surrounded with the peace and gentleness of mimosa, lilies and acacia? I could mention any number of tyrants whose lives would have been less violent if only they had loved flowers."

Hayes married restaurateur Jack Solomon in 1944. Solomon was previously married to another Ziegfeld Follies girl, Helen Gallagher Solomon. When her husband died in 1963 she inherited Gallagher's Steakhouse which she ultimately sold to Jeff Brody as she was unable to maintain both her floral business and a restaurant. She died of an apparent heart ailment at St. Vincent's Hospital in Greenwich Village, New York City, aged 79 and was cremated at Ferncliff.
