= Julie London filmography =

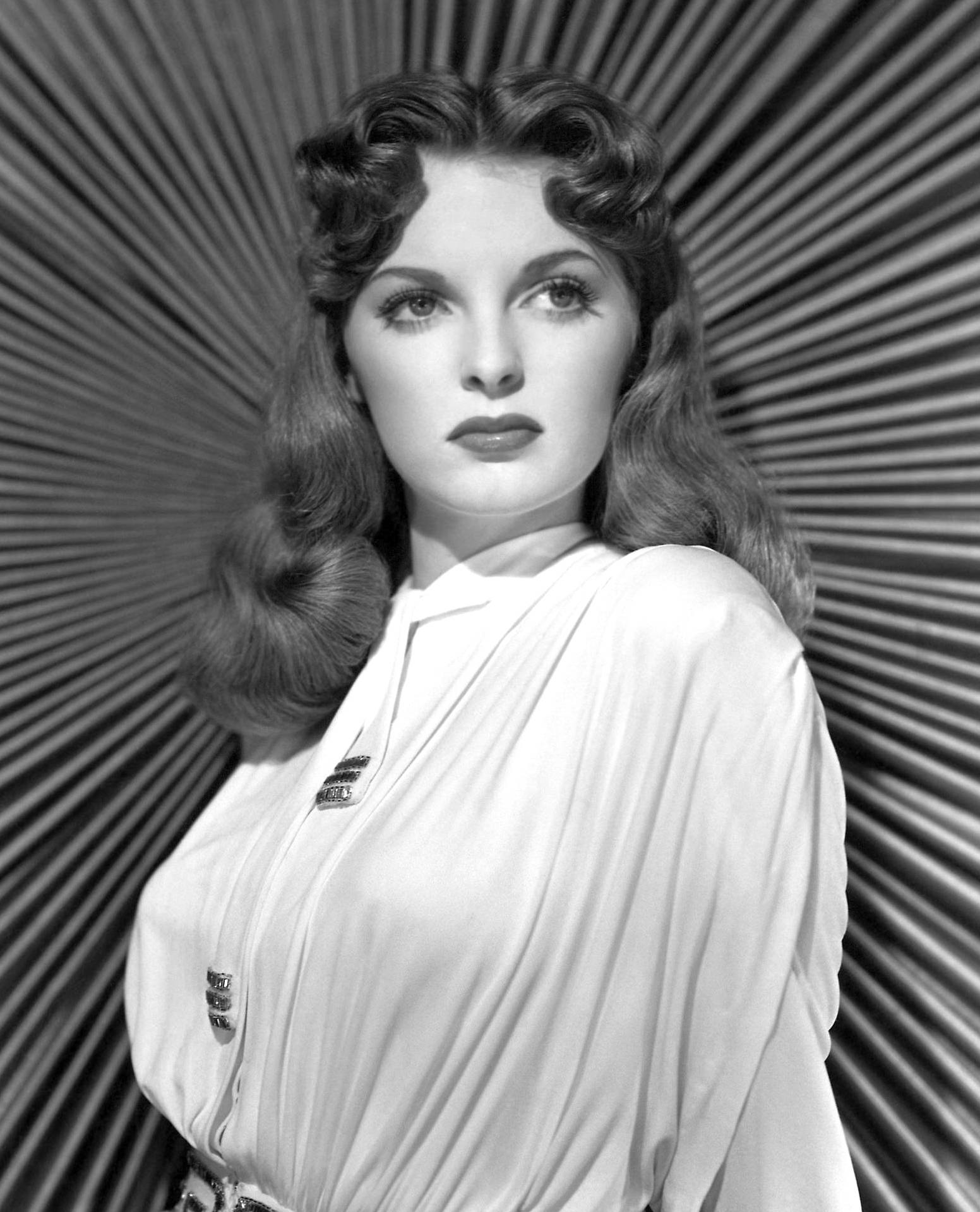
London in 1948

Julie London was an American actress and singer who began her career in film, debuting in Nabonga (1944) before having substantial roles in the horror film The Red House (1947) and the war film Task Force (1949). After beginning a professional singing career in 1955, London occasionally continued to appear in films, including The Girl Can't Help It (1956), in which she performed her signature track, "Cry Me a River". Other roles included in the Western Saddle the Wind (1958) and the drama Night of the Quarter Moon (1959).

Between 1972 and 1978, London portrayed nurse Dixie McCall in the popular NBC series Emergency!, in which she co-starred with her husband, Bobby Troup. In 1974, she received a Golden Globe Award nomination for Best Actress in a Drama Series for her performance in the series' third season. The series marked London's final screen role.

== Film ==
Year	Title	Role	Notes	Ref.
1944	Nabonga	Doreen Stockwell		
1945	Janie	Girlfriend	Uncredited	
1945	Diamond Horseshoe	Chorine	Uncredited	
1945	On Stage Everybody	Vivian Carlton		
1946	Night in Paradise	Palace Maiden	Uncredited	
1947	The Red House	Tibby		
1948	Tap Roots	Aven Dubney		
1949	Task Force	Barbara McKinney		
1950	Return of the Frontiersman	Janie Martin		
1951	The Fat Man	Pat Boyd		
1955	The Fighting Chance	Janet Wales		
1956	Crime Against Joe	Frances 'Slacks' Bennett		
1956	The Girl Can't Help It	Herself		
1956	The Great Man	Carol Larson		
1957	Drango	Shelby Ransom		
1958	Saddle the Wind	Joan Blake		
1958	A Question of Adultery	Mary Loring		
1958	Voice in the Mirror	Ellen Burton		
1958	Man of the West	Billie Ellis		
1959	Night of the Quarter Moon	Ginny O'Sullivan Nelson		
1959	The Wonderful Country	Helen Colton		
1960	The 3rd Voice	Corey Scott		
1961	The George Raft Story	Sheila Patton		
1968	The Helicopter Spies	Laurie Sebastian		

== Television ==
Year	Title	Role	Notes
1954	Armstrong Circle Theatre		Episode: "Hit a Blue Note" (5.15)
1956	The Rosemary Clooney Show		Episode 2
1957	The Ed Sullivan Show		(10.27)
1957	Zane Grey Theater	Julie	Episode: "A Time to Live" (1.25)
1957	Shower of Stars		Episode: "Jazz Time" (3.7)
1957	Playhouse 90	Angela	Episode: "Without Incident (1.36)
1957	Person to Person		Season 5 premiere
1957	The Big Record	Herself	Episode 3
1957–1961	What's My Line?	Herself – Mystery Guest	3 episodes
1959	The David Niven Show	Maggie Malone	Episode: "Maggie Malone" (1.9)
1959	Adventures in Paradise	Dalisay Lynch	Episode: "Mission to Manilla" (1.7)
1960	The Red Skelton Show	Up and Coming Vocalist	Episode: "Clem the Disc Jockey" (9.13)
1960	Laramie	June Brown	Episode: "Queen of Diamonds" (2.1)
1960	Rawhide	Anne Danvers	Episode: "Incident at Rojo Canyon" (3.1)
1960	Michael Shayne	Anita	Episode: "Die Like a Dog" (1.3)
1960	Dan Raven	June Carey	Episode: "Tinge of Red" (1.12)
1961	Hong Kong	Penny Carroll	Episode: "Suitable for Framing" (1.14)
1961	The Barbara Stanwyck Show	Julie	Episode: "Night Visitors" (1.14)
1961	Checkmate	Libby Nolan	Episode: "Goodbye, Griff" (1.28)
1961	Follow the Sun	Jill Rainey	Episode: "Night Song" (1.11)
1962	The Jack Benny Program	Herself-Singer	Episode: "March 4, 1962"
1963	The Eleventh Hour	Joan Ashmond	Episode: "Like a Diamond in the Sky" (1.19)
1963	The Dick Powell Theatre	Linda Baxter	Episode: "Charlie's Duet" (2.25)
1965	The Alfred Hitchcock Hour	Barbara	Episode: "Crimson Witness" (3.12)
1965	The Tonight Show with Johnny Carson	Herself – Singer	Episode: "October 19, 1965"
1965	I Spy	Phyllis	Episode: "Three Hours on a Sunday Night" (1.12)
1967	The Man from U.N.C.L.E.	Laura Sebastian	Episode: "The Prince of Darkness Affair: Part II" (4.5)
1968	The Hollywood Squares	Herself	5 episodes
1968	The Big Valley	Julia Saxon	Episode: "They Called Her Delilah" (4.2)
1972	Adam-12	Dixie McCall, R.N.	Episode: "Lost and Found" (5.4)
1972–1978	Emergency!	Dixie McCall, R.N.	126 episodes, (final appearance)

== Sources ==
- Owen, Michael (2017). Go Slow: The Life of Julie London. Chicago Reviews Press. ISBN 978-1-613-73859-7.
