= Melting Millions =

Melting Millions may refer to:

- Melting Millions (1927 serial), an American adventure film serial
- Melting Millions (1917 film), an American silent comedy film
