= Anna Luther =

American actress (1893–1960)

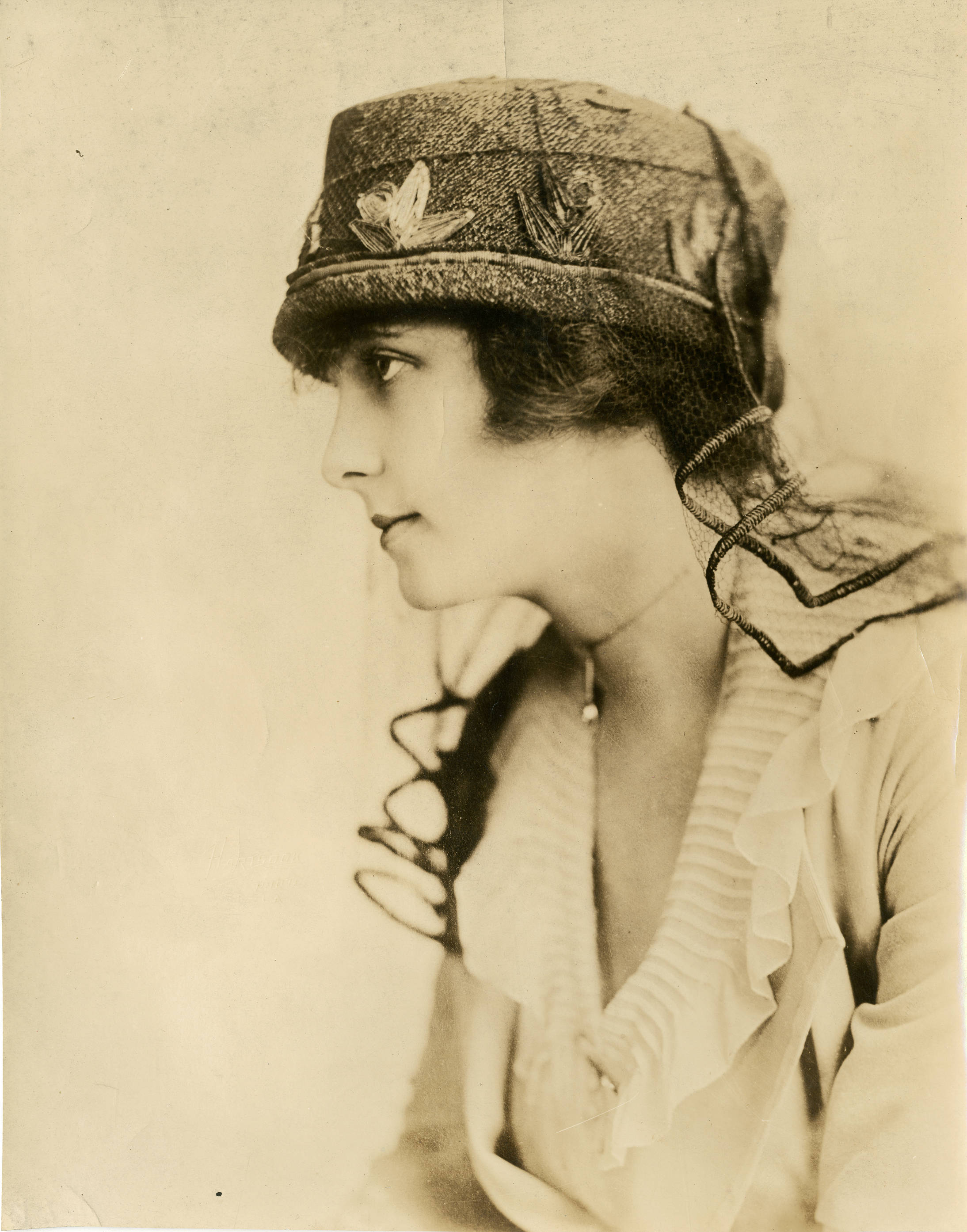
- Luther in 1919
- Born: July 7, 1893; Newark, New Jersey, U.S.
- Died: December 16, 1960 (aged 67); Woodland Hills, California, U.S.
- Resting place: Mount Sinai Memorial Park
- Other names: Ann Luther; Anne Luther
- Occupation: Actress
- Years active: 1913–1957
- Spouses: Samuel E. Dribben (m. 1913; div. 1913) Ed Gallagher (m. 1923; div. 1924): Frank Mayo

Anna Luther (July 7, 1893 – December 16, 1960), sometimes credited as Ann Luther or Anne Luther, was an American actress. She was known as "the Poster Girl".

== Early life and career ==
Anna Luther was born in Newark, New Jersey on July 7, 1893, although some sources give her birthdate as 1894 or 1897, and her burial plot gives the 1897 date. However, she appears on the 1905 census as a 12 year old. She was the youngest of four children to Jacob Luther, who was a New York sewing machine sales representative, and Sarah Limonick, a midwife. Both of her parents were Jewish immigrants from Russia who arrived in the U.S. in 1891. She had two brothers, Elan and Hyman, and a sister, Pauline. She spent her childhood in Newark and Jersey City.

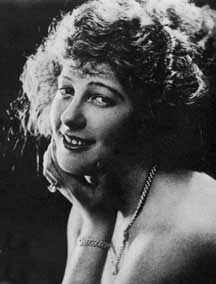
Luther in the 1910s

Luther made her film debut in the 1913 short Hearts of the Dark, followed by The Fly Leaf of Fate (1913), and The Changeling (1914). Her first feature film was The Wolf (1914), which credited her as Ann Luther. She starred with William Garwood in Her Moment (1918). Among her other film credits include roles in Melting Millions (1917), The Governor's Lady (1923), and Sinners in Silk (1924). She appeared in 48 films from 1913 to 1957, her final screen appearance being in The Wayward Bus (1957), in which she played an uncredited role.

Newspapers described her hair as having an orange hue. In 1915, Motion Picture Classic said Luther had "one of the most magnificent bungalows in California."

== Court litigation ==
Luther named Peggy Hopkins Joyce as a friend and Los Angeles, California mine operator and millionaire, Jack White, as a lover. White accompanied Luther to California as a theatrical producer. In June 1924 the actress brought a $100,000 breach of contract suit against White for allegedly promising to star her in four motion pictures. In a countersuit White demanded a $10,000 refund spent on the Luther film and charged Luther with having a bad reputation. White contended that he did not violate the Mann Act merely by sharing the same drawing room with Luther on their journey west.

Some of the witnesses anticipated for the trial were Charlie Chaplin, Evelyn Nesbit, Pearl White, and Mabel Normand. White's attorneys brought up the death of murdered silent film director William Desmond Taylor. They claimed Luther told White to pay or "watch out for what happened to Taylor."

During court proceedings Luther admitted paying $2,500 in rent for her place in Great Neck, although she possessed a bank balance of only $141 at the time. White admitted having a contract with Luther but his lawyers succeeded in getting Luther to make a number of admissions which hurt her case. The presiding judge dropped Luther's suit because of her failure to prove a legal contract between herself and White. After the trial's conclusion Luther filed notice of motion for a new trial.

== Marriages and scandals ==
Luther's first marriage was to the New York attorney Samuel E. Dribben in 1913, but it ended in divorce that same year. She next married Edward Gallagher of the Gallagher and Shean vaudeville comedy team on December 5, 1923. She and Gallagher separated in February 1924, with her husband continuing to play on the road and Luther returning to making motion pictures.

In March 1925 she was named as co-respondent in a lawsuit brought by actress Dagmar Godowsky. Godowsky began divorce proceedings after claiming to have discovered Luther with her husband, actor Frank Mayo, in Mayo's apartment. Luther and Mayo later married, and Mayo's marriage to Godowsky was annulled in 1926 because divorce decree of Frank Mayo and his first wife Joyce Eleanor Moore was never written.

Luther and Juanita Hansen were named as two co-respondents in a divorce suit brought by Evelyn Nesbit against Jack Clifford. Clifford had left Nesbit in 1918, and she divorced him in 1933.

== Death ==
Luther died at the Motion Picture Country Home in Woodland Hills in 1960 at 63 years old. Her funeral was conducted by Pierce Brothers of Hollywood at Mount Sinai Cemetery Chapel, and she was buried at Mount Sinai Memorial Park. Her burial plot gives her name as Anne Luther, and her epitaph reads "Beloved aunt".

== Selected filmography ==
- The Island of Desire (1917)
- Melting Millions (1917)
- Her Moment (1918)
- Why Women Sin (1920)
- The Woman Who Believed (1922)
- The Governor's Lady (1923)
- The Truth About Wives (1923)
- Sinners in Silk (1924)
- Ten After Ten (1924)
