= Fifi D'Orsay =

Canadian-American actress (1904–1983)

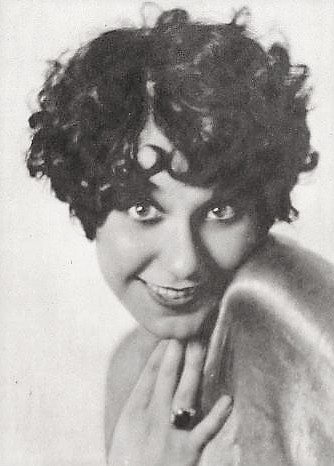
- D'Orsay in 1930
- Born: Marie-Rose Angelina Yvonne Lussier; April 16, 1904; Montreal, Quebec, Canada
- Died: December 2, 1983 (aged 79); Los Angeles, California, U.S.
- Resting place: Forest Lawn Memorial Park, Glendale, California
- Occupations: Actress, singer
- Years active: 1929–1973
- Spouses: Maurice Hill (m. 1933; div. 1939) Peter LaRicos (m. 1947; div. 1952)

Fifi D'Orsay (born Marie-Rose Angelina Yvonne Lussier; April 16, 1904 – December 2, 1983) was a Canadian and American actress and singer.

== Early life ==
Fifi D'Orsay was born Marie-Rose Angelina Yvonne Lussier in Montreal, Quebec, Canada, to a father who was a postal clerk. The Lussiers were a large family, with Fifi having 11 siblings. She was educated at the Academy of the Sacred Heart in Montreal before graduating and finding work as a secretary.

== Biography ==
As a young stenographer, she wished to become an actress, and moved to New York City. Once there she found work with the Greenwich Village Follies, after an audition in which she sang "Yes! We Have No Bananas" in French. When asked where she was from, she told the director she was from Paris, France, and that she had worked in the Folies Bergère. The impressed director hired her, billing her as "Mademoiselle Fifi".

While working in the Follies, she became involved with Ed Gallagher, a veteran actor who was half of the successful Broadway comedy team of Gallagher and Shean. Gallagher and D'Orsay put together a vaudeville act, and he coached her in the art of show business. After touring in vaudeville, she headed to Hollywood and adopted the surname "D'Orsay" (after a favorite perfume). Soon after she began working in films, often cast as the "naughty French girl" from "gay Paris".

She became a U.S. citizen in 1936, just as her career as a film star came to a sharp halt when she walked out on her contract at Fox Studios and was blacklisted.

While never becoming a major top-billing name, she found steady work, and appeared with such stalwarts as Bing Crosby and Buster Crabbe. For years she worked in both film and vaudeville; pacing her appearances in film with continued performances in vaudeville. When age put an end to the glamour roles, she took jobs in television; including two appearances each on ABC's Adventures in Paradise (as a mother superior in the episode "Castaways"), and the CBS legal drama Perry Mason (in the episodes "The Case of the Grumbling Grandfather" and "The Case of the Bountiful Beauty")—as well as appearing in the CBS sitcom Pete and Gladys. She was a contestant on Groucho Marx's You Bet Your Life (February 23, 1956), and at the age of 67 she bookended her career with a return to the Broadway stage in the Tony Award-winning musical, Follies.

== Personal life ==
D'Orsay married twice. Her first husband was Earl Hill (also billed as "Maury Hill" & "Morgan Hill"), the son of a Chicago manufacturer. She divorced Hill in 1939, and married Peter LaRicos in 1947, a restaurateur and agent.

D'Orsay died from cancer, aged 79, on December 2, 1983, at the Motion Picture & Television Country House and Hospital in Woodland Hills, Los Angeles. She was interred in the Forest Lawn Memorial Park Cemetery in Glendale, California. Survivors included a sister, Mrs. Alice Angloo of Pompano Beach, Florida.

== Legacy ==
D'Orsay was credited as the girl who made the phrase "Ooh la la" widely known.

== Partial filmography ==
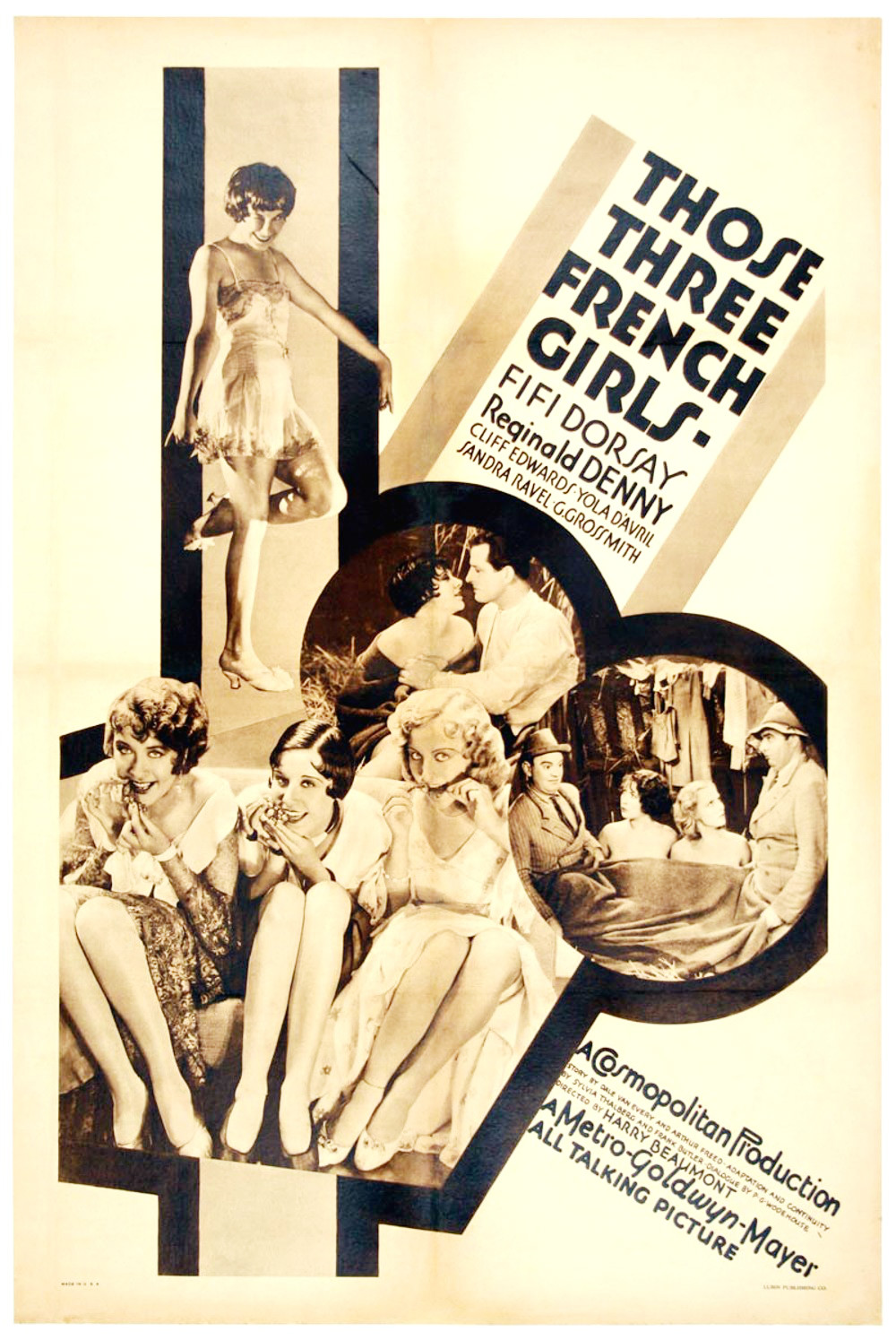
Those Three French Girls (1930)

- They Had to See Paris (1929) - Fifi
- Hot for Paris (1929) - Fifi Dupre
- On the Level (1930) - Miimi
- Women Everywhere (1930) - Lili La Fleur
- Those Three French Girls (1930) - Charmaine
- Mr. Lemon of Orange (1931) - Julie La Rue
- The Stolen Jools (1931, Short) - Fifi D'Orsay
- Women of All Nations (1931) - Fifi (uncredited)
- Young as You Feel (1931) - Fleurette
- The Girl from Calgary (1932) - Fifi Follette
- They Just Had to Get Married (1932) - Marie
- The Life of Jimmy Dolan (1933) - Budgie
- Going Hollywood (1933) - Lili Yvonne
- Wonder Bar (1934) - Mitzi
- The Merry Widow (1934) - Marcelle
- Three Legionnaires (1937) - Olga
- Submarine Base (1943) - Maria Styx
- Nabonga (1944) - Marie
- Delinquent Daughters (1944) - Mimi
- Dixie Jamboree (1945) - Yvette
- The Gangster (1947) - Mrs. Ostroleng
- Four Horsemen of the Apocalypse (1962) - French Prisoner (uncredited)
- Wild and Wonderful (1964) - Simone
- What a Way to Go! (1964) - Baroness
- The Art of Love (1965) - Fanny
- Assignment to Kill (1968) - Mrs. Hennie

== See also ==
- Other Canadian pioneers in early Hollywood
