= Her Moment =

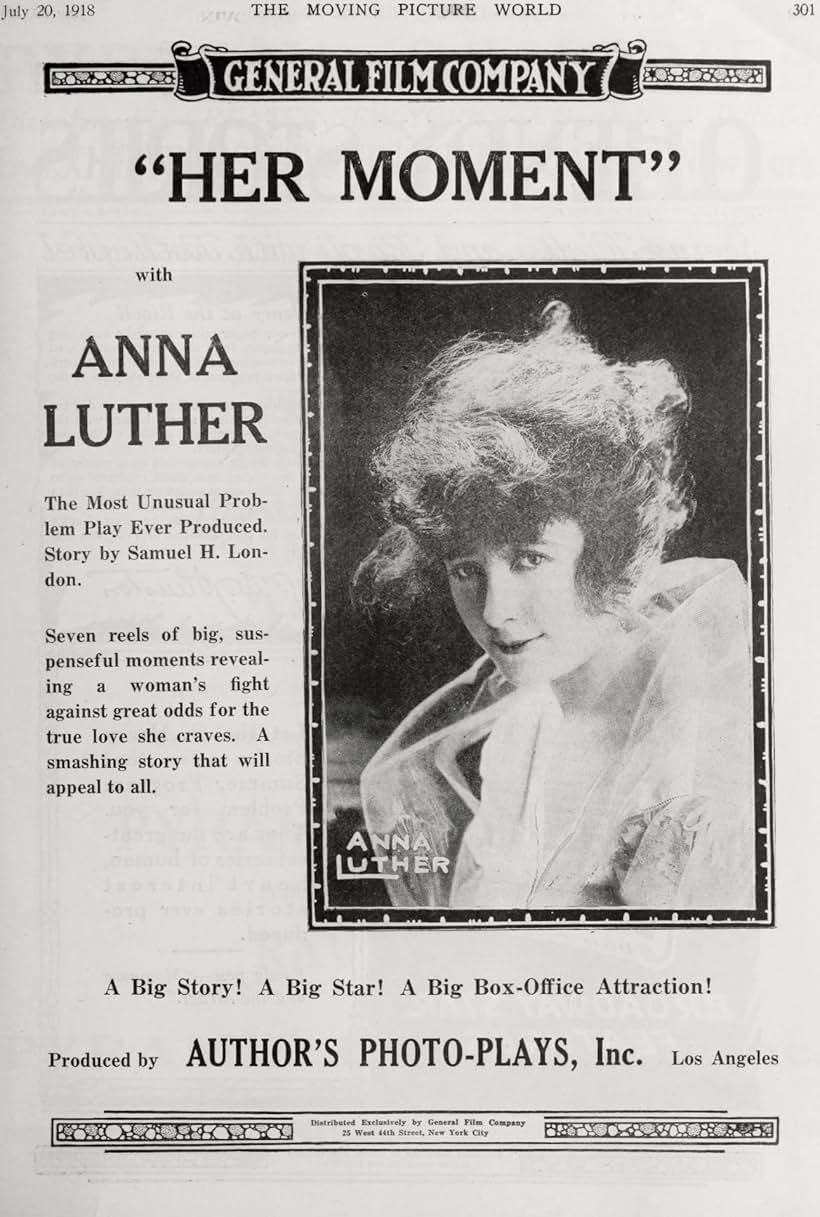
- Film ad
- Directed by: Frank Beal
- Written by: Samuel H. London
- Starring: William Garwood; Anne Luther
- Production company: Author's Photo-Plays Inc.
- Distributed by: General Film Company
- Release date: July 1918
- Running time: 7 reels
- Country: United States
- Language: Silent (English intertitles)

Her Moment is a 1918 American silent drama film directed by Frank Beal and starring William Garwood and Anne Luther. It is not known whether the film currently survives.

== Plot ==
As described in a film magazine, after her sweetheart Jan Drakachu (Garwood) emigrates to America, Katinka Veche (Luther) falls into the hands of Victor Dravich (Brownlee), a man of despicable character who takes her from one place to another before finally coming to Arizona. Jan has become a successful mining engineer and is sent to Arizona to look after the firm's mining interests. One night when he is intoxicated Jan is brought to Katinka's shack and, realizing her past, she does not reveal herself to him. Jan returns to New York City and, after the death of Dravich, is where Katinka also goes. When they meet Katinka discovers that she has nothing to fear and that Jan loves her as much as ever.

== Cast ==
- Anna Luther as Katinka Veche
- William Garwood as Jan Drakachu
- Alida B. Jones as Minka (credited as Alida Jones)
- Anne Schaefer as Jan's Mother (credited as Ann Schaeffer)
- Frank Brownlee as Victor Dravich
- Bert Hadley as Boris
- J.L. Franck as Father Benoni
- William Lowery as Ulaf (credited as William A. Lowery)
- William Bytell as Sherwin Matthews
- Leon De La Mothe as Sando Gryj (credited as Leon Kent)
- Eugene Owen as Warren McLeod
- Scott R. Beal as Roy Clint
- Murdock MacQuarrie as Mr. Johnson (credited as Murdock McQuarrie)

== Reception ==
The film industry created the National Association of the Motion Picture Industry (NAMPI) in 1916 in an effort to preempt censorship by states and municipalities, and it used a list of subjects called the "Thirteen Points" which film plots were to avoid. Her Moment, with its white slavery plot line, is an example of a film that clearly violated the Thirteen Points and yet was still distributed. Since the NAMPI was ineffective, it was replaced in 1922.

Like many American films of the time, Her Moment was also subject to restrictions and cuts by city and state film censorship boards. For example, the Chicago Board of Censors on its first review refused to issue a permit for showing the film as it features white slavery and the sale of women for immoral purposes. After a reexamination, the Chicago board issued a permit with the following cuts: Reel 4, entire incident of man going upstairs after speaking with Dravich, speaking to servant in upper hall, all scenes of encounter with Katinka and all scenes showing him with torn face after encounter with her, scene of young women at windows as Katinka is brought to whipping post, filing Katinka teeth, Reel 5, the two intertitles "Why have they brought me here?" and "Last night they lashed me" etc., Reel 6, striking of Katinka, and, Reel 7, the intertitle "And because of this you demand my name" etc.
