= Conceit (film) =

1921 film

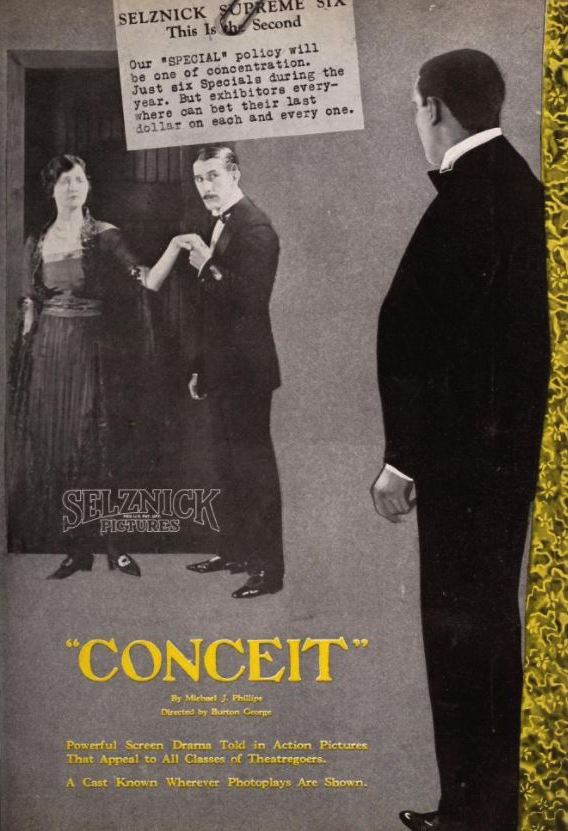
- Advertisement
- Directed by: Burton George
- Written by: Edward J. Montagne (scenario); Randolph Bartlett (intertitles)
- Story by: Michael J. Phillips
- Starring: William B. Davidson; Mrs. De Wolf Hopper
- Cinematography: Alfred Gandolfi
- Edited by: Cyril Gardner
- Production company: Selznick Pictures
- Distributed by: Select Pictures
- Release date: December 20, 1921
- Running time: 50 minutes
- Country: United States
- Language: Silent (English intertitles)

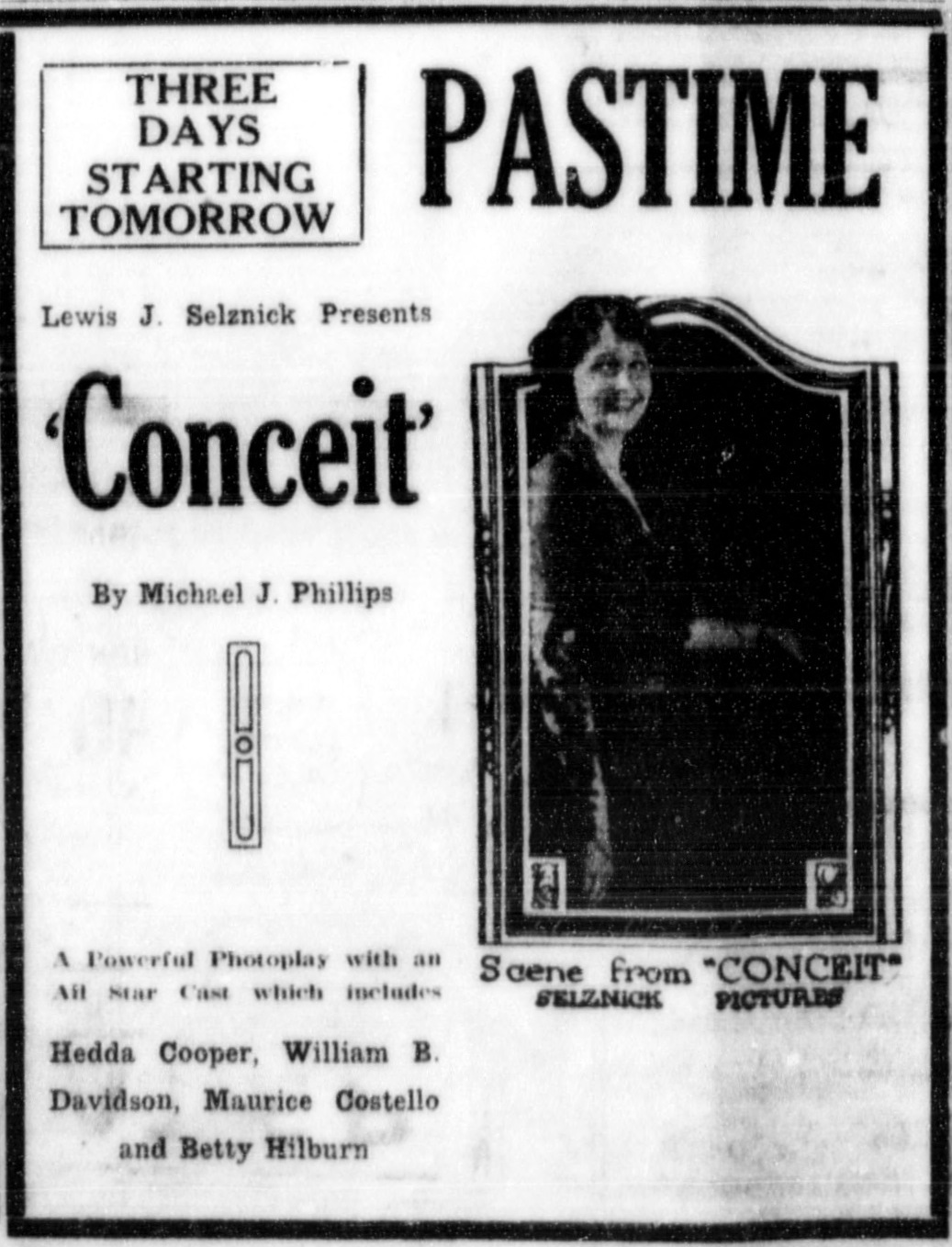
Newspaper advert.

Conceit is a 1921 American silent drama film directed by Burton George, produced by Selznick Pictures, and released by Select Pictures. The film stars William B. Davidson and Mrs. De Wolf Hopper, who later became a gossip columnist using the name "Hedda Hopper".

== Plot ==
As described in a film magazine, wealthy William Crombie (Davidson) has always been able to purchase what he wanted, including his lovely wife Agnes (Hopper). At a dinner party in his luxurious home, to the intense boredom of his guests, William tells of his hunting exploits and of having killed a wounded bear with his bare hands. When this is doubted, he invites all of the guests to a hunting trip, and they go to his palatial lodge in the Canadian Rockies. There he proposes that they each remain until he has killed a bear. There it transpires that his old guide, who had always killed the bears for William, is ill and has sent his son in his stead. Finally, all of the guests have killed a bear and left except for William, and his guide has become so disgusted with him that he leaves. William becomes lost in the wilderness and fear almost drives him insane. He is finally sheltered by a trapper, Barbe la Fleche (Costello), and, after recovering from his fright, becomes infatuated with the trapper's ward, Jean (Hilburn). Promising all the luxuries his wealth can provide her, he almost persuades her to go away with him. The trapper finds them together and suggests that he and William fight for her. When William shows his fear, the young woman calls him a coward and drives him from the camp. Returning to his city home he finds that he has been to weak to hold onto his wife and that she has been made love to by another man, Carl Richards (Gerrard). Knowing of his cowardliness, Carl laughs at him and William hangs his head and slinks away. William is then convinced by his one true friend to take boxing lessons, and after being battered by a husky trainer (Wolheim), an unsuspected fighting spirit is aroused and he knocks out the trainer. Filled with a new spirit, he returns to his home and beats up and throws Carl out of his house. William then returns to the Canadian Rockies and, after a series of adventures, rescues Barbe and Jean after a desperate battle with a half-breed and an Indian. The trapper tells him that he has won Jean fairly, but William's better spirit rules and he returns to his lodge where he finds his wife happily waiting for him.

== Cast ==
- William B. Davidson as William Crombie
- Hedda Hopper as Mrs. Agnes Crombie (credited as Mrs. De Wolf Hopper)
- Charles K. Gerrard as Carl Richards
- Betty Hilburn as Jean la Fleche
- Maurice Costello as Barbe la Fleche
- Pat Hartigan as Sam Boles (credited as Patrick Hartigan)
- Warren Cook as Alexander McBain
- Red Eagle as The Wolf, an Indian Trapper
- Louis Wolheim as Boxing Instructor (uncredited)

== Production ==
The working title for the film was You Can't Kill Love. The wilderness scenes were filmed near the city of Banff in Banff National Park, Alberta, Canada.

== Preservation ==
A copy of Conceit is preserved at the UCLA Film and Television Archive.
