= Gallagher and Shean =

Vaudevillian musical comedy double act of the early 20th century

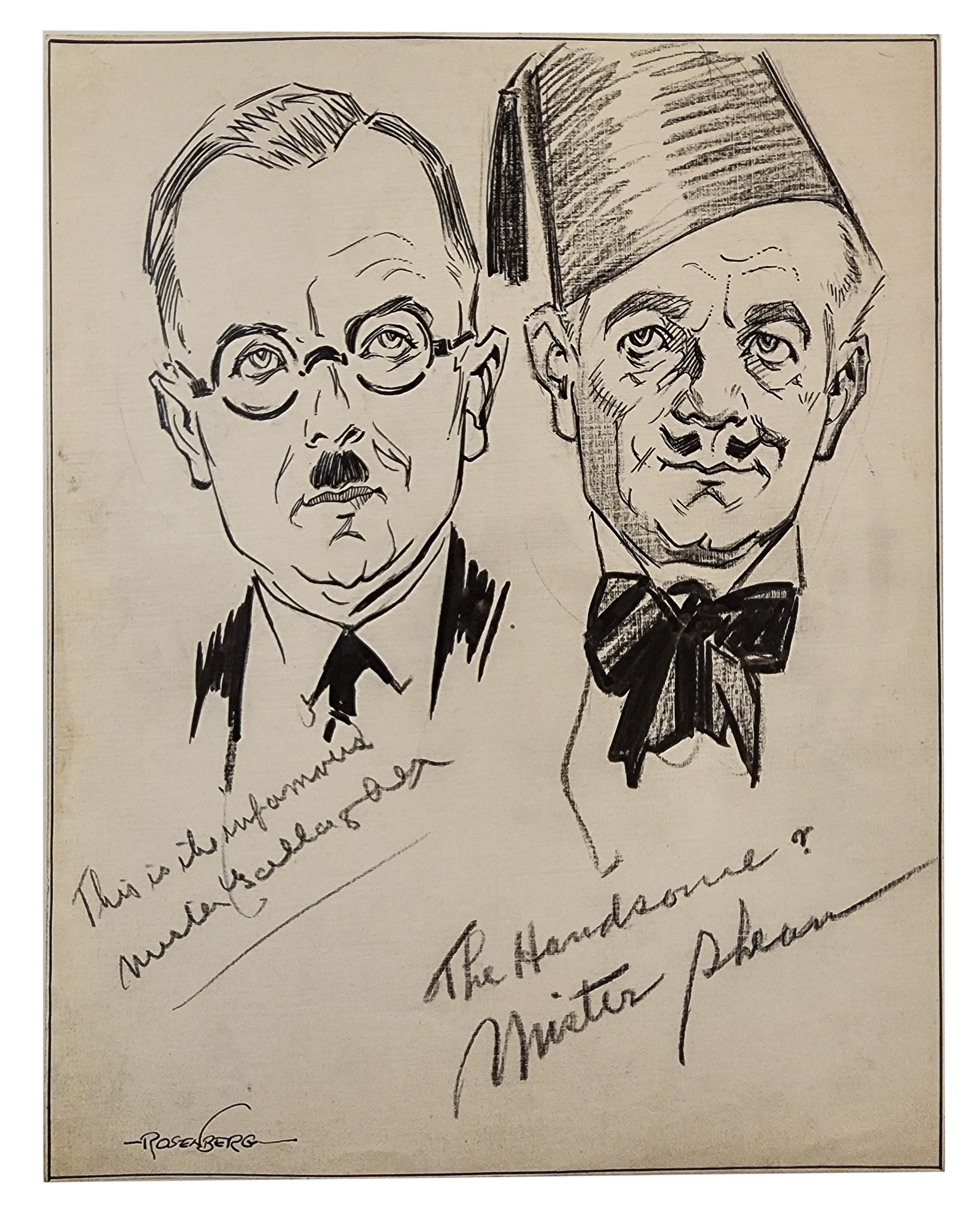
- Gallagher–Shean autographed drawing by Manuel Rosenberg for The Cincinnati Post, 1924
- Notable work: Song entitled, "Absolutely, Mr. Gallagher? Positively, Mr. Shean!"

Comedy career
- Years active: 1910–1914 and 1920–1925
- Genres: Vaudeville, comedy
- Former members: Ed Gallagher; Al Shean

Gallagher & Shean was a highly successful musical comedy double act in vaudeville and on Broadway in the 1910s and 1920s, consisting of Ed Gallagher (1873–1929) and Al Shean (1868–1949); Shean was the maternal uncle of the Marx Brothers.

== Career ==
Both comedians were relatively obscure vaudeville performers until they teamed up in 1910. Gallagher and Shean first joined forces during the tour of The Rose Maid in 1912, but they quarreled and split up two years later, in 1914. They next appeared together in 1920, to star in the Shubert Brothers' production of the highly successful Cinderella on Broadway, through the efforts of Shean's sister, Minnie Marx (mother of the Marx Brothers). This pairing lasted until 1925 and led to their fame.

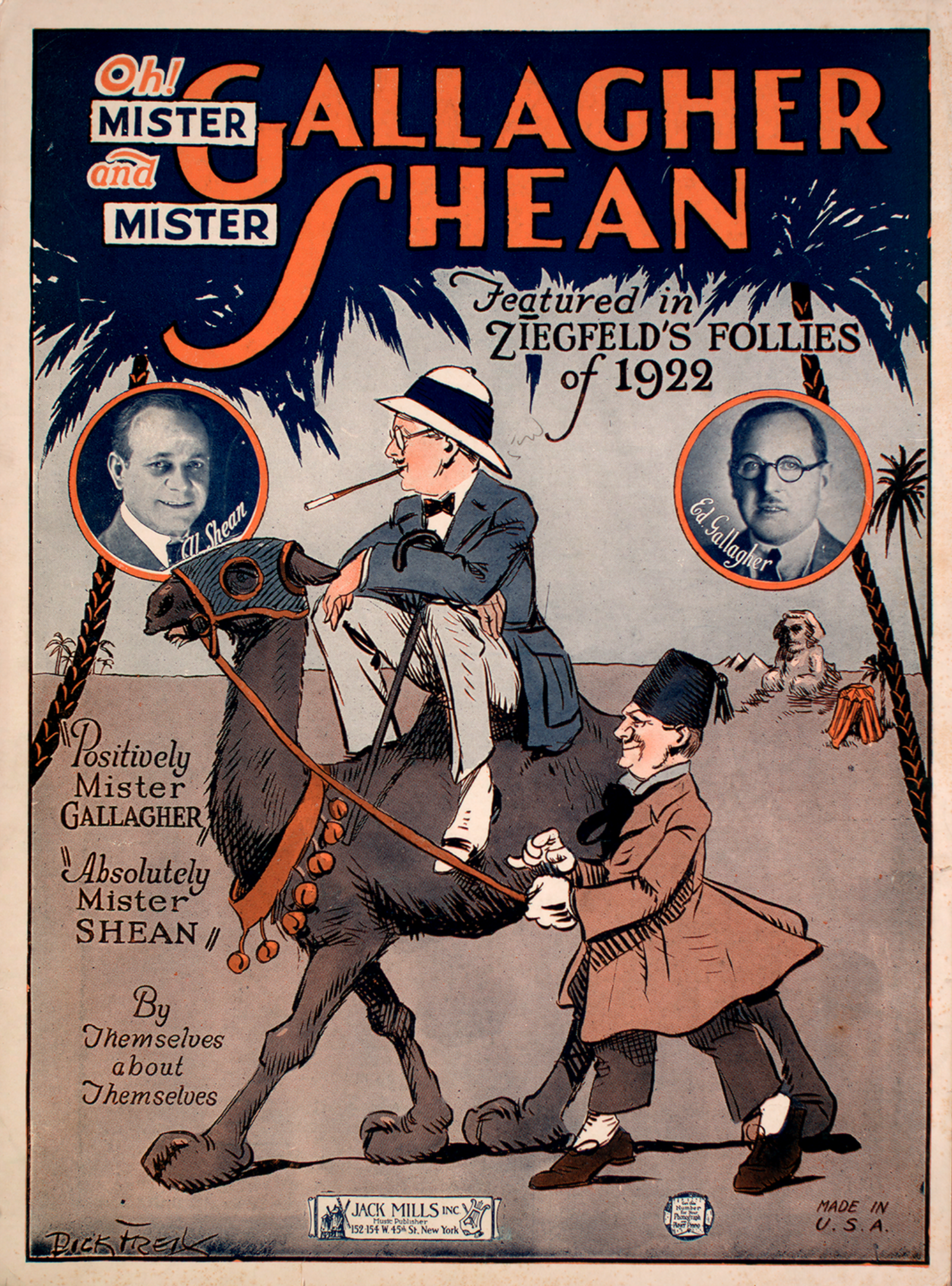
Sheet music cover for their popular titular song

Gallagher and Shean remain best known for their theme song "Mister Gallagher and Mister Shean", which was a hit in the 1922 Ziegfeld Follies. Bryan Foy, son of stage star Eddie Foy and eldest member of the "Seven Little Foys", said he had written the song, but it is officially attributed to Gallagher and Shean. The song is also sometimes called "Absolutely, Mr. Gallagher? Positively, Mr. Shean!" The song endured in popularity and was regularly tweaked and updated with additional verses; consequently, it exists in several different versions. The song was recorded by Gallagher and Shean as two sides of a 10" 78 rpm record in 1922 for Victor Records. It was also recorded on Okeh Records by The Happiness Boys (Billy Jones and Ernie Hare) and on Cameo Records by Irving and Jack Kaufman, and even in Yiddish on Banner Records, by M. Z. Feinman Brothers. When performed by other artists, it was usually preceded with this introductory lyric:

There are two funny men
The best I've ever seen
One is Mr. Gallagher
And the other Mr. Shean

When these two cronies meet
Why it surely is a treat
The things they say
And the things they do
And the funny way they greet ...

The song was extremely popular and well remembered: a pastiche was included in The Cabaret Girl, a 1922 musical produced in London; a parody of it was recorded by Bing Crosby and Johnny Mercer in the late 1930s; another parody was performed by Jackie Gleason and Groucho Marx (who was Al Shean's nephew) on television in 1967; and Lenny Bruce was able to make an offhanded reference to it in his nightclub act of the 1960s, all of them confident that audiences would recognize it right away.

Each verse ended with a question-and-answer refrain, one of which—Shean singing "Absolutely, Mister Gallagher?" and Gallagher replying "Positively, Mister Shean!"—became their tagline. This cross-talk format continues to be imitated, parodied, and referenced for audiences who may have no knowledge of the original. Cartoonist Bobby London depicted his characters Dirty Duck and Weevil telling each other "Posilutely, Weevil!" "Absotively, Mr. Duck!" In the 1960s, an Australian cleaning product "Mister Sheen" launched a successful TV campaign using the original tune with new lyrics ("Oh, Mr. Sheen, Oh, Mr. Sheen"), as did several 1980s radio commercials for Pitney Bowes office equipment: "Absolutely, Mister Pitney!" "Positively, Mister Bowes!"

Capitalizing on the post-King Tut craze for everything Egyptian, Gallagher and Shean appeared in Egyptian dress (Gallagher in the pith helmet and white suit of the tourist, Shean in the fez and oddly skirted jacket of a "native" Egyptian colonial).

== Later life and career ==
In 1921, they were sued by The Shubert Organization for breach of contract. According to Shubert, they could not perform for the competing Ziegfeld Follies. The plaintiff claimed that Gallagher and Shean's act was "unique and irreplaceable". The comedians' defense was that their act was mediocre, and the judge initially found in their favor, although the decision was later reversed.

For a time in the 1920s, Gallagher was involved with his protegee, vivacious French-Canadian dancer Fifi D'Orsay. In 1925, inventor Theodore Case made a short film of them in his sound-on-film process at his Auburn, New York, studio; however, the film was lost in a fire at the Auburn studio in the mid-1950s, and only outtakes of the film now exist. In August 1931, Fleischer Studios released a short cartoon, Mr. Gallagher and Mr. Shean, as part of the Fleischer Screen Songs series. In this short, Jack Kenny (1886–1964) did the voice of Gallagher.

Gallagher and Shean often had personal differences during their partnership. The constant backstage hostilities inspired Neil Simon to incorporate them into his successful show business-themed comedy The Sunshine Boys.

Ed Gallagher suffered a nervous breakdown after the partnership ended in 1925 and died in 1929; Al Shean worked occasionally thereafter as a solo character actor. The Metro-Goldwyn-Mayer musical Ziegfeld Girl (1941) features a recreation of Gallagher and Shean's act with Al Shean in his familiar role and costume and character actor Charles Winninger portraying Gallagher. Also The Republic Pictures musical Atlantic City (1944) features a recreation of Gallagher and Shean's act with Al Shean and character actor Jack Kenney portraying Gallagher.

Ed Gallagher's wife, Helen, became a partner in Gallagher's Steak House in New York City and the restaurant was named after her. After Ed's death, she married her partner, Jack Solomon.
