= Dean Poll =

American restaurateur

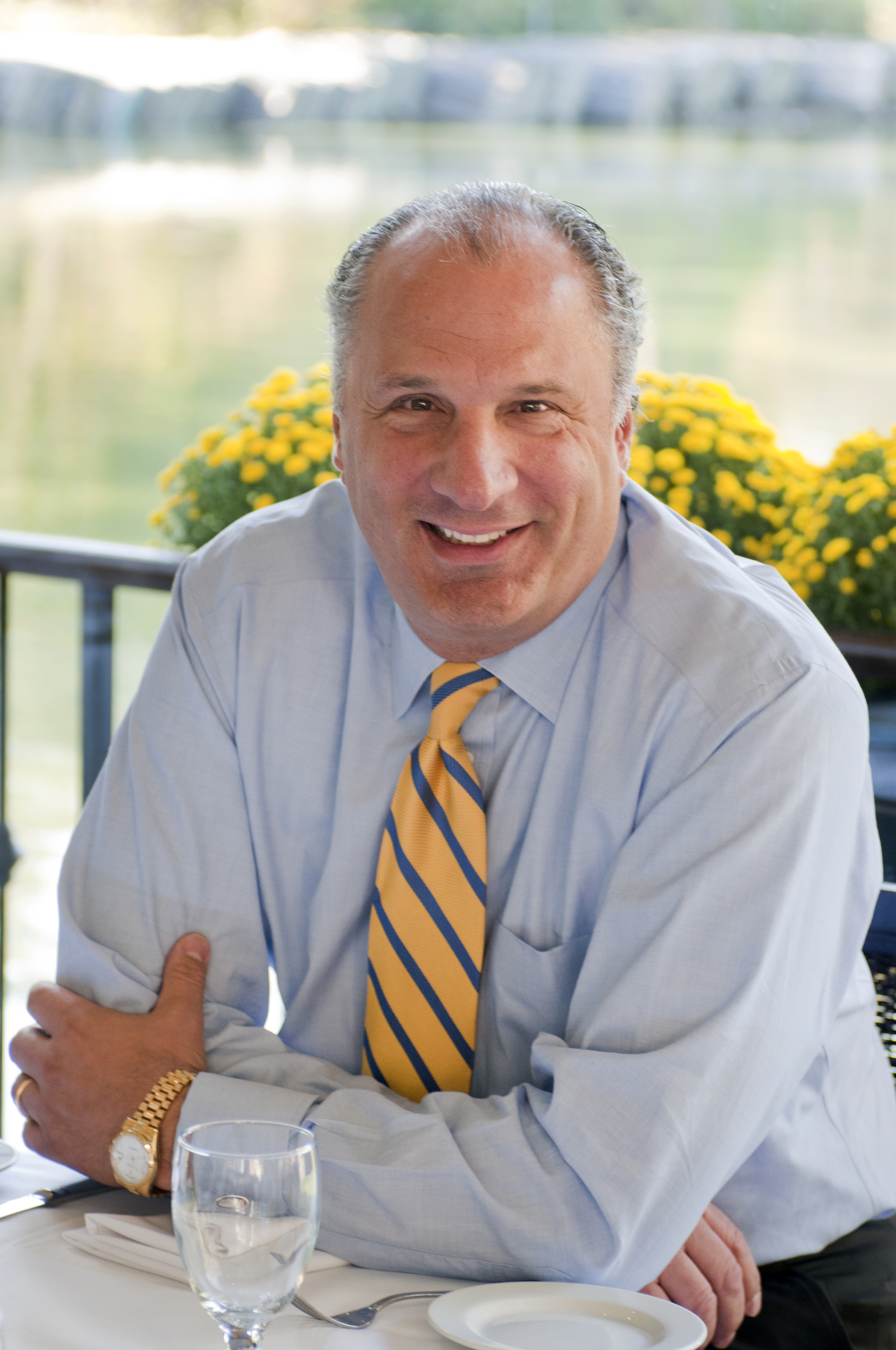

Dean J. Poll (born April 18, 1957) is an American restaurateur based in New York and the founder of the Poll Group, former operator of Manhattan's Loeb Central Park Boathouse and owner of Gallagher's Steakhouse.

== Background and early career ==
Born in Manhasset, on Long Island's North Shore, Dean Poll is the second of three sons of Alexandra and Dimitri Poll. He played center on the Paul D. Schreiber High School basketball team in Port Washington. On weekends and during school breaks he worked as a "water boy" in Pappas Restaurant, his family's high-volume, 250-seat seafood restaurant in Sheepshead Bay, Brooklyn.

Poll started working full-time after high school when he became the purchasing manager for the family's newest property, a 14,000 sq ft. food complex in Midtown Manhattan's Time & Life Building. It comprised Dawson's Pub, La Petite Brassiere, Bon Jour coffee shop and Southampton Caterers that served the office building-dense Rockefeller Center neighbourhood.

Working in the restaurant's back-of-house trenches, Poll excelled at inspecting seafood in the legendary Fulton Fish Market, negotiating with meat brokers in Manhattan's Meatpacking District, and sourcing vegetables in the South Bronx's Hunts Point, the largest produce market in the world.

== The Long Island years ==
In 1980, Dean Poll and his brothers, Gillis and George, recreated Pappas Restaurant in Williston Park, renaming it Riverbay Seafood Bar & Grill in 1989. In 1986, they opened Bryant & Cooper Steak House and butcher shop in Roslyn. By 1997, The New York Times called Bryant & Cooper "arguably the best steakhouse on Long Island" and Riverbay, "Nassau-Suffolk's No. 1 seafood restaurant."

== Entering Manhattan market ==
Interested in expanding into Manhattan, Dean Poll dissolved his partnership with his brothers in 1998–1999. Dividing the assets, he retained ownership of Riverbay, while setting his sights on the Central Park Boathouse, a city-owned concession that was requesting proposals.

== Central Park Boathouse ==
In June 2000, New York City's Department of Parks and Recreation awarded Dean Poll the concession for the Loeb Boathouse restaurant. The restaurant closed in October 2022.

== Tavern on the Green ==
In August 2009, the Parks Department granted Dean Poll the concession for Tavern on the Green, the second of two restaurants in Manhattan's iconic Central Park. A major labor dispute erupted between Dean Poll and the union representing Tavern workers. The dispute resulted in Poll backing out of the deal and the union organizing a 44-day strike [11] at the Boathouse. Ultimately the two sides came to terms.

== Gallagher's Steakhouse ==
In January 2013, Dean Poll bought legendary Gallagher's Steakhouse from longtime owner Marlene Brody. Rescuing the 200-seat, Prohibition-era restaurant 14 days before it was scheduled to close, Poll began a strategic 7-month renovation that the New York Post's Steve Cuozzo likened to "stirring the resurrection of a classic." In April 2014, Gallaghers reopened to rave reviews that celebrated Poll's success restoring its vintage horseshoe bar, iconic glass-encased meat locker.

In December 2017, Poll's resurrection of Gallagher's was the subject of a New York Times article by James Barron.

Since Poll took ownership, Gallaghers has undergone significant changes and has continued to receive recognition from various publications and rankings as a notable steakhouse in New York and internationally

In 2023, Poll opened Gallaghers Steakhouse Boca Raton in South Florida, marking the legendary restaurant's first expansion under his direction outside of the historic Manhattan location.

== Personal life ==
Dean Poll and his wife Linda, whom he met in 1980, are parents of two sons. He is on the Board of the Boys' Club of New York and has served on the board of the New York Athletic Club.

An active member of New York's Greek-American community, Poll served as parish council president of the Archdiocesan Cathedral of the Holy Trinity from 2013 - 2016. The Greek Orthodox Ecumenical Patriarch named Dean Poll an Archon, [17] Nomophylax, one of the highest civilian honors given by the Greek Orthodox Church.
