= Ed Gallagher (actor) =

American vaudeville actor

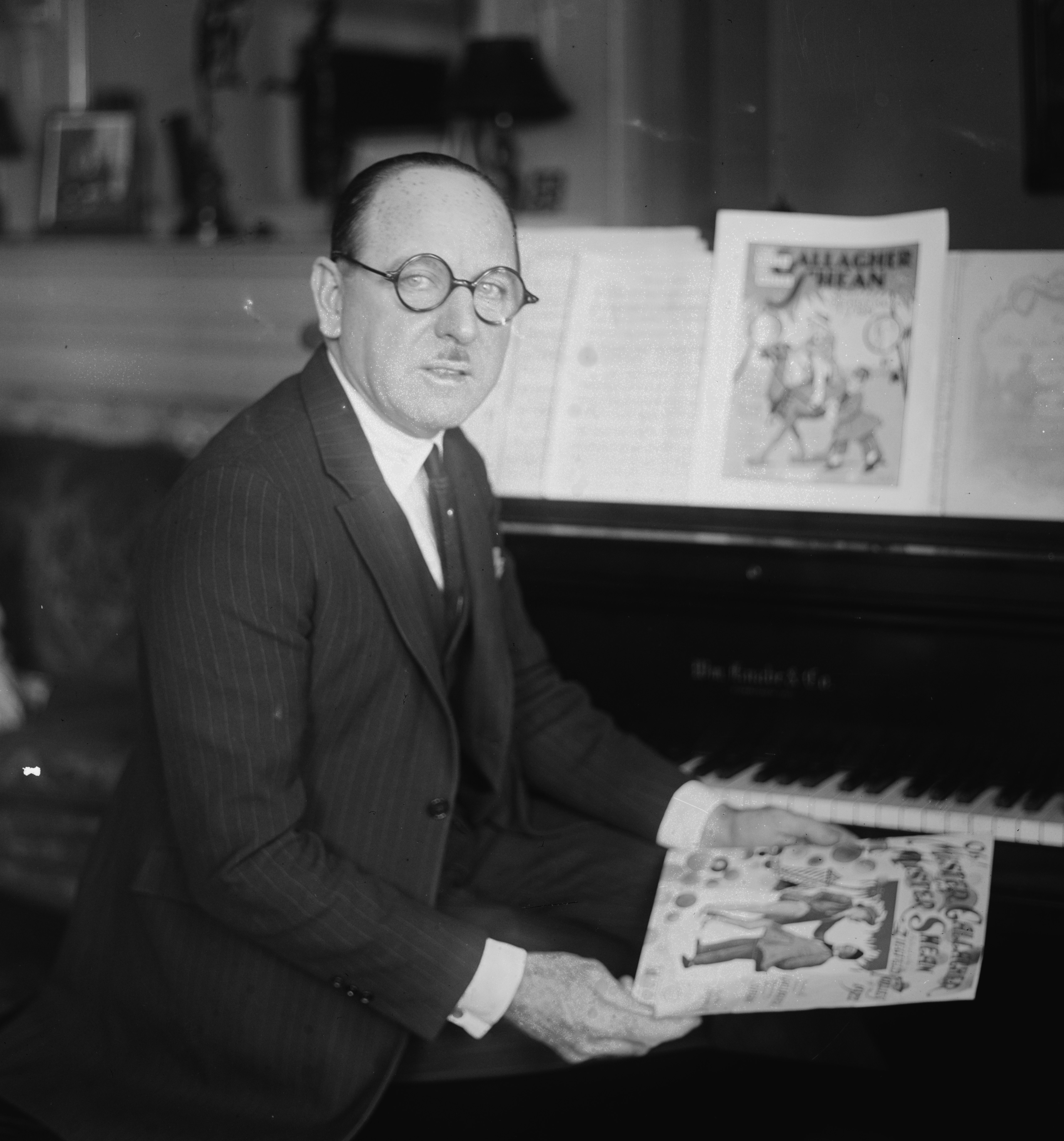
- Gallagher in 1924
- Born: Edward Francis Gallagher; 1873; San Francisco, California, U.S.
- Died: May 28, 1929 (aged 55-56); River Crest Sanitarium, Astoria, Queens, New York, U.S.
- Occupation: Stage actor
- Spouse(s): Helen Gallagher (divorced) Anna Luther (m. 1923–1924)

Edward Francis Gallagher (1873 – May 28, 1929) was a vaudeville actor and half of the comedy act Gallagher and Shean. Their story was told in an animated movie Mr. Gallagher and Mr. Shean (1931) by Max Fleischer and Dave Fleischer, who also created Koko the Clown and Betty Boop. Gallagher and Shean also reportedly made an early sound film at the Theodore Case studio in Auburn, New York, in 1925.

== Biography ==
Gallagher was born in 1873 in San Francisco, California.

For fifteen years, Gallagher partnered with Joe Barrett in a comedy act that was best known for military burlesques, particularly "The Battle of Too Soon." Gallagher subsequently teamed with Al Shean to create the act Gallagher and Shean. While the act was successful, the men apparently did not like each other much.

Gallagher first performed with Shean in 1912 in the operetta The Rose Maid, which ran for 176 performances at the Globe Theatre in New York. The duo broke up in 1914, not performing again until 1920 and then stayed together until 1925. They had a featured part in the 1922 Ziegfeld Follies, earning a salary of US$1500 a week (approximately $29,000 today).

His fourth wife was actress Anne Luther.

He had a nervous breakdown in 1925 and in 1926 was institutionalized at the River Crest Sanitarium in Astoria, New York, where he died on May 28, 1929.

== Legacy ==
Helen Gallagher, his third wife, a former Ziegfeld girl, and Jack Solomon launched what would become Gallagher's Steak House in November 1927. She married Solomon after Gallagher's death.
