= The Governor's Lady (1923 film) =

1923 film by Harry F. Millarde

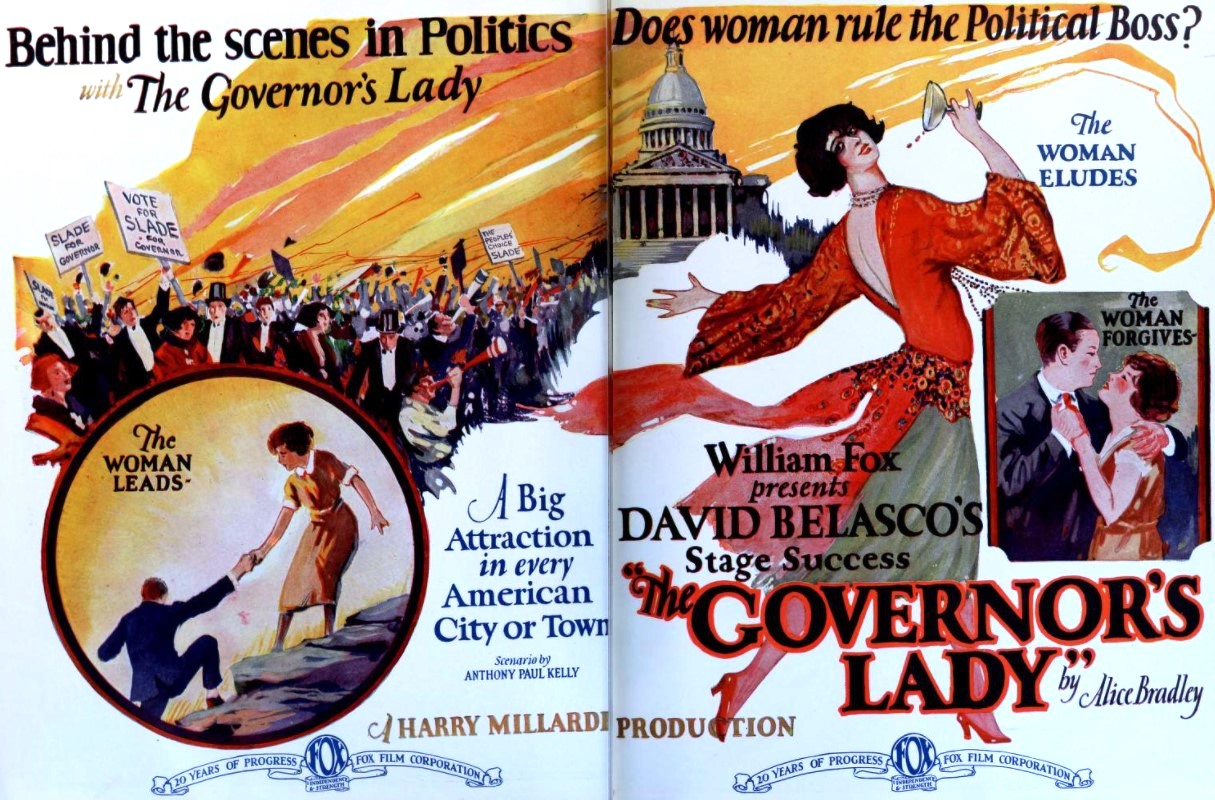
- Advertisement
- Directed by: Harry Millarde
- Written by: Anthony Paul Kelly
- Produced by: William Fox
- Starring: Robert T. Haines; Jane Grey; Anna Luther
- Distributed by: Fox Film Corporation
- Release date: October 28, 1923
- Running time: 8 reels
- Country: United States
- Language: Silent (English intertitles)

The Governor's Lady is a lost 1923 American silent drama film directed by Harry Millarde. It was produced and distributed by Fox Film Corporation.

== Plot ==
As described in a film magazine review, Daniel Slade is an energetic and home loving miner who, through some careful real estate transactions, amasses a fortune. When he decides to splurge and run for governor, his wife Mary cannot revert from the petty cares of leaner days. Then a triangle develops through Katherine Strickland desire for power and wealth that Slade could give her, if only he were free. She tells Mrs. Slade that she should leave this part of the country so that no scandal should attach to Daniel while he runs for office. Mary agrees at first, but then realizes that she is being put aside for a younger woman. With this last minute change of heart, even though the divorce has gone through, it is not long before Daniel and Mary are reunited.

== Cast ==
- Robert T. Haines as Daniel Slade
- Jane Grey as Mrs. Mary Slade
- Anna Luther as Katherine Strickland
- Frazer Coulter as George Strickland
- Leslie Austin as Robert Hayes

== Preservation ==
With no prints of The Governor's Lady located in any film archives, it is a lost film.

== See also ==
- 1937 Fox vault fire
