= Charles K. Gerrard =

Irish-American actor (1883–1969)

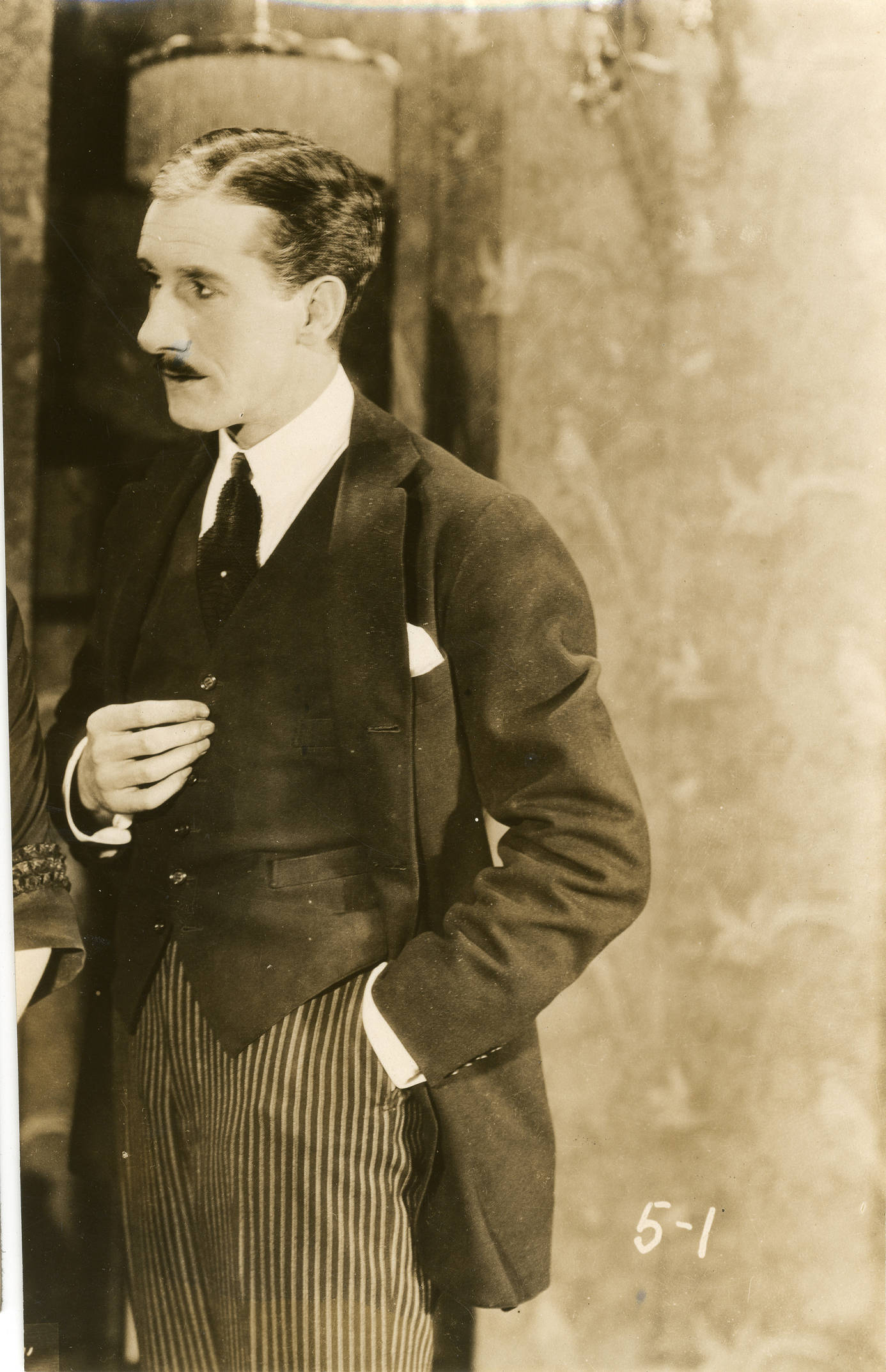
- Gerrard in 1922
- Born: Charles Kavanagh; 20 December 1883; Carlow, County Carlow, Ireland, United Kingdom
- Died: 1 January 1969 (aged 85); New York City, New York, U.S.
- Occupation: Actor
- Years active: 1916–1934

Charles K. Gerrard (20 December 1883 – 1 January 1969), also known as Charles Kavanagh, was an Irish-American motion-picture actor, and the elder brother of actor and film director Douglas Gerrard.

== Selected filmography ==
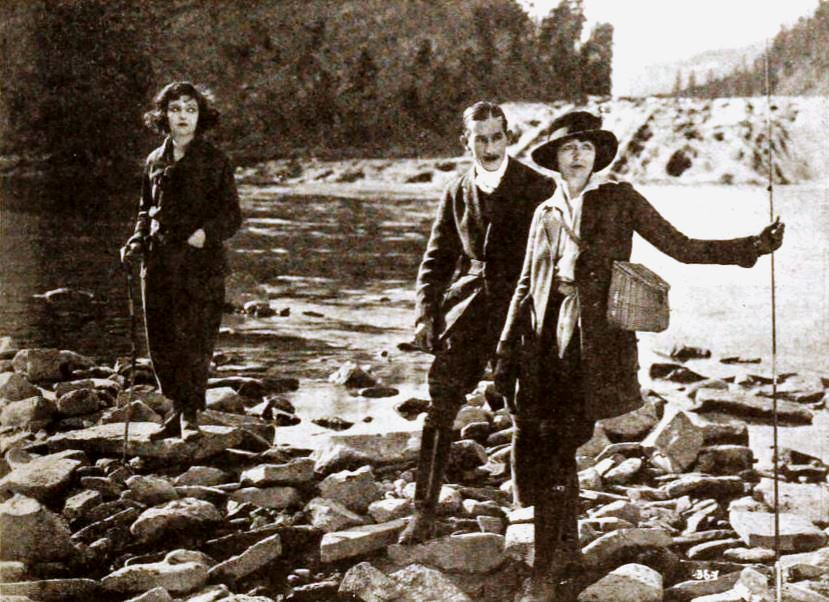
Still showing Gerrard (center) in Conceit, 1921

- His Brother's Wife (1916)
- The Prince Chap (1916) - Jack Rodney, Earl of Huntington
- Miss Petticoats (1916) - Count Renier
- The Country That God Forgot (1916) - Craig Wells
- The Plow Girl (1916) - Lord Percy Brentwood
- The Heart of Texas Ryan (1917) - Sen. J. Murray Allison (uncredited)
- Melting Millions (1917) - Hamilton
- A Woman's Awakening (1917) - Lawrence Topham
- Down to Earth (1917) - Charles Riddles - Ethel's Lover
- Little Miss Optimist (1917) - Samuel Winter
- The Fair Barbarian (1917) - Capt. Francis Barold
- The Legion of Death (1918) - Grand Duke Orlof
- The Demon (1918) - Tom Rearrdon
- Playthings (1918) - Gordon Trenwith
- The Hun Within (1918) - Karl Wagner
- Beans (1918) - Wingate
- She Hired a Husband (1918) - Gerald Grant
- Venus in the East (1919) - Maddie Knox
- Pettigrew's Girl (1919) - Hugh Varick
- Something to Do (1919) - Thompson
- The Pest (1919) - John Harland
- The New Moon (1919) - Theo Kameneff
- The Isle of Conquest (1919) - Van Surdam
- The Teeth of the Tiger (1919) - Gordon Savage
- Counterfeit (1919) - Vincent Cortez
- Mary Ellen Comes to Town (1920) - William Gurson, aka 'Will the Weasel'
- Why Women Sin (1920) - Baron de Ville
- Whispers (1920) - J. Dyke Summers
- The World and His Wife (1920) - Don Alvarez
- Blackbirds (1920) - Duval
- The Passionate Pilgrim (1921) - Qualters
- Out of the Chorus (1921) - Ned Ormsby
- The Gilded Lily (1921) - John Stewart
- Sheltered Daughters (1921) - French Pete
- Conceit (1921) - Carl Richards
- French Heels (1922) - Keith Merwyn
- Heroes and Husbands (1922) - Martin Tancray
- Sure Fire Flint (1922) - Dipley Poole
- When Knighthood Was in Flower (1922) - Sir Adam Judson
- The Lights of New York (1922) - Jim Slade
- Pawned (1922) - Dr. Crang
- Anna Ascends (1922) - Count Rostoff
- The Darling of the Rich (1922) - Torrence Welch
- The Glimpses of the Moon (1923) - 'Streffy' (Lord Altringham)
- Richard the Lion-Hearted (1923) - Sultan Saladin
- The Dangerous Maid (1923) - Sir Peter Dare
- Her Temporary Husband (1923) - Clarence Topping
- Loving Lies (1924) - Tom Hayden
- Lilies of the Field (1924) - Ted Conroy
- Circe, the Enchantress (1924) - Ballard 'Bal' Barrett
- Off the Highway (1925) - Hector Kindon
- California Straight Ahead (1925) - Creighton Deane
- The Man on the Box (1925) - Count Karaloff
- The Wedding Song (1925) - Paul Glynn
- Accused (1925) - Lait Rodman
- The Better 'Ole (1926) - Maj. Russett
- The Nervous Wreck (1926) - Reggie De Vere
- For Wives Only (1926) - Dr. Carl Tanzer
- The Cheerful Fraud (1926) - Steve
- Play Safe (1927) - Scott's son
- The Heart Thief (1927) - Count Lazlos
- Framed (1927) - Arthur Remsen
- Painting the Town (1927) - Raymond Tyson
- Home Made (1927) - Robert Van Dorn
- The Port of Missing Girls (1928) - DeLeon
- Ladies of the Night Club (1928)
- The Wright Idea (1928) - Mr. Roberts
- Caught in the Fog (1928) - Crook
- Romance of a Rogue (1928) - Leonard Hardingham
- The Lone Wolf's Daughter (1929) - Count Polinac
- Circumstantial Evidence (1929) - Henry Lord
- Light Fingers (1929) - London Tower
- Men Without Women (1930) - Cmdr. Weymouth
- Journey's End (1930) - Pvt. Mason
- Anybody's Woman (1930) - Walter Harvey
- Another Fine Mess (1930, Short) - Lord Leopold Ambrose Plumtree (uncredited)
- The Lion and the Lamb (1931) - Bert
- The Man Who Came Back (1931) - Gibson (uncredited)
- Dracula (1931) - Martin
- Always Goodbye (1931) - Bit Role (uncredited)
- The Big Gamble (1931)
- The Menace (1932) - Bailiff
- Devil's Lottery (1932) - Toaster (uncredited)
- Man About Town (1932) - Minor Role
- If I Were Free (1933) - Minor Role (uncredited)
- Facing the Music (1933) - (uncredited)
- A Political Party (1934) - Mr. Whitman (final film role)
