= Delinquent Daughters =

1944 film by Albert Herman

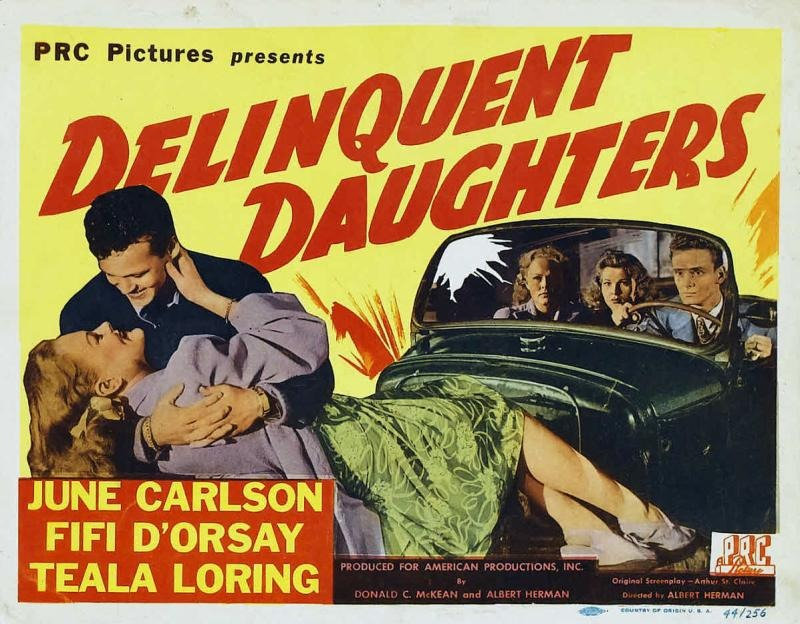
- Directed by: Albert Herman
- Written by: Arthur St. Claire
- Produced by: Albert Herman; Donald C. McKean
- Starring: June Carlson; Fifi D'Orsay; Teala Loring
- Cinematography: Ira H. Morgan
- Edited by: George M. Merrick
- Music by: Lee Zahler
- Production company: American Productions
- Distributed by: Producers Releasing Corporation
- Release date: July 15, 1944
- Running time: 72 minutes
- Country: United States
- Language: English

Delinquent Daughters, or Accent on Crime, is a 1944 American teenage drama/exploitation film starring June Carlson, Fifi D'Orsay and Teala Loring. Directed by Albert Herman, the PRC "Poverty Row" release is about a police investigation into the suicide death of a high school girl, and the local hard-partying, petty criming teenagers afterwards.

== Plot ==
Both friends and community are shaken by the suicide of teenage Lucille Dillerton. Schoolmates June Thompson, Francine Van Pelt, and Sally Higgins, reflect on her throwing herself in the ocean. June and Francine are saddened; the calloused Sally just wants everybody to shut up. The local police have ruled out accident and murder and treat suicide as a foregone conclusion; the implication is given that the unmarried Lucille was pregnant, perhaps by the older Nick Gordon, and at the end of her rope.

Lt. Hanahan arrives at the school and has Lucille's friends called into the principal's office for questioning. It goes the same as outside, except for Sally being even more impudent and taunting to the investigators.

Sally and June get a late ride home with Sally's boyfriend Jerry Sykes in his hopped-up roadster (which can top 100 mph, easily outrunning the local police). They stop at a candy store, and without the slightest forewarning Jerry robs it, netting a measly $2.80. The police radio identifies a car like his, and soon Hanahan is on his tail. Jerry hits a pedestrian outside the Merry-Go-Round, a notorious nightspot and teenage hangout owned by "cool customer" Nick, and run with his middle-aged French lover Mimi. Nick, who appears to be orchestrating the robberies, tells Jerry to ditch the car and part it out so it cannot be traced to a sure manslaughter.

To cover for June being out so late Sally impersonates Mrs. Higgins on the phone to June's father, a violent tempered widower, inventing - without June's knowledge or permission - the fabrication that June is spending the night at their home. Hanahan arrives looking for Jerry, who sneaks out the back. Hanahan chats up the town's news reporter, Steve Cronin, proffering his hard-line law and order stance; surprisingly, Cronin is thoughtful, and argues that better recreational opportunities for the kids will keep them out of trouble. Local headlines soon blare that juvenile delinquency is running amok, caused by the erosion of family bonds.

Other members of the local clique arrive. A while later June's boyfriend, Rocky Webster, sneaks into Nick's office and pawns his father's revolver for three dollars to get some cash to hang with the crowd. Hanrahan orders the joint closed down for the night. Nick offers to drive June and Sally home. June's father is still up in spite of the wee hour, spoiling. Skeptical, he'd called the real Mrs. Higgins and learned the truth. He tonguelashes June, slaps her, and chases her out with his cane, shouting to never come back with her lies.

Dazed, June wanders to the ocean and is ready to throw herself in when Rocky shows up. Desperate himself, he proposes marriage. They devise a plan to lie their way to underage wedlock in another state, but before they can act Hanahan appears and detains them. Sally and Jerry arrive, and Jerry shoves Hanahan off the pier. Jerry invites June and Rocky to join in robbing a nearby gas station, but they decline. Jerry distracts the attendant while Sally rifles the register, netting just $6.30. Immediately after they rob a lunch counter of $13.00. Jerry asks Sally to hop a freight with him for the bright lights of the city. With only $20 bucks to show from all their hauls Sally calls Jerry a small-timer and dumps him. Hitchhiking home, she picked up by a Good Samaritan, only to pull an automatic and rob him of a huge pile of cash.

The next night Hanahan rounds up Rocky and June, and takes them into custody. The pair, Francine, Roy Ford, and their parents are placed in front of local Judge Craig. Instead of punishment he counsels the kids and upbraids the parents for failing to invest enough of themselves in their children to steer them right.

June's father tries to be more patient, and Rocky gets a job after school and starts saving his money. Proving himself a small-timer, Jerry accepts Nick's offer to back him up in a big payroll heist for just 10% of the cut, which he jumps at. The robbery goes sideways, Jerry seriously wounds the guard with the pawned revolver, and is slain in return.

The gun is traced back to Mr. Webster, then to Rocky's pawn. Hanahan leaves him in the clear.

Hanahan brings Mimi in for questioning. She protects Nick, but is starched to learn Sally was the getaway driver. She goes to the club after Nick, ends up in a vicious catfight with Sally, then slugged unconscious by him. Nick and Sally flee together. When police arrive Mimi rats them both out.

The town squad car takes off in hot pursuit after the speeding crooks. Rocky and June trail in his jalopy, but can't keep up...nor can the police. Rocky takes a shortcut spilling him out right in front of Nick's car, which swerves and cartwheels over an enormous cliff.

Cronin, Hanrahan, and Judge Craig spearhead turning the Merry-Go-Round into a wholesome teenage nightspot. Everyone is dancing and having a ball, including the threesome operating it.

== Cast ==
- June Carlson as June Thompson
- Mary Bovard as Betty
- Joe Devlin as Lt. Hanahan
- Fifi D'Orsay as Mimi
- Teala Loring as Sally
- Margia Dean as Francine Van Pelt
- Johnny Duncan as Rocky Webster
- Jimmy Zaner as Jerry
- Joe Dawson as Nick Gordon
- Frank McGlynn, Sr. as Judge Craig
- Parker Gee as Steve Cronin
- Warren Mills as Roy Ford

== See also ==
- List of films in the public domain in the United States

== Bibliography ==
- Fetrow, Alan G. Feature Films, 1940-1949: a United States Filmography. McFarland, 1994.
