= The Woman Who Believed =

1922 film

- Directed by: Jack Harvey
- Starring: Walter Miller and Anna Luther
- Release date: 1922
- Country: United States
- Language: Silent

The Woman Who Believed is a 1922 American silent drama film, directed by Jack Harvey. It stars Walter Miller and Anna Luther.
