= Why Women Sin =

1920 silent film

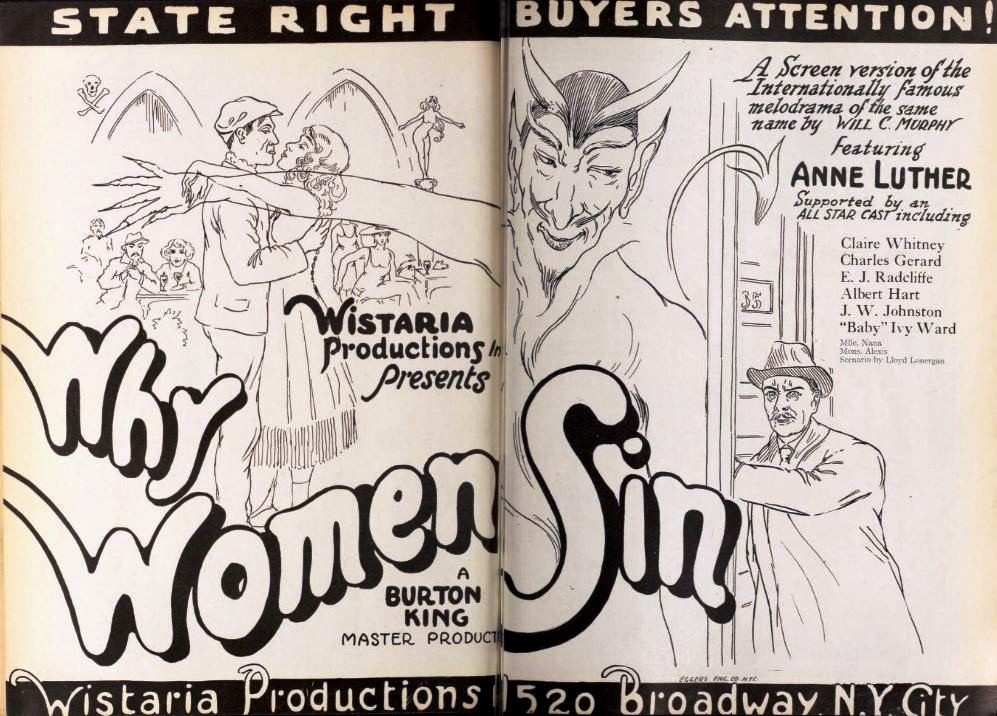
- Directed by: Burton L. King
- Written by: Will C. Murphy (play); Lloyd Lonergan
- Produced by: Burton L. King
- Starring: Anna Luther; Charles K. Gerrard; Claire Whitney
- Cinematography: Ernest Haller
- Production companies: Burton King Productions; Wisteria Productions
- Distributed by: States Rights
- Release date: April 1920
- Running time: 60 minutes
- Country: United States
- Languages: Silent; English intertitles

Why Women Sin is a 1920 American silent drama film directed by Burton L. King and starring Anna Luther, Charles K. Gerrard and Claire Whitney.

== Cast ==
- Anna Luther as Dorothy Pemberton
- E. J. Ratcliffe as Philip Pemberton
- Baby Ivy Ward as Little Grace
- Claire Whitney as Baroness de Ville
- Charles K. Gerrard as Baron de Ville
- Al Hart as Horton
- Jack W. Johnston as Captain Morelake

== Bibliography ==
- Munden, Kenneth White. The American Film Institute Catalog of Motion Pictures Produced in the United States, Part 1. University of California Press, 1997.
