= Sinners in Silk =

1924 film by Hobart Henley

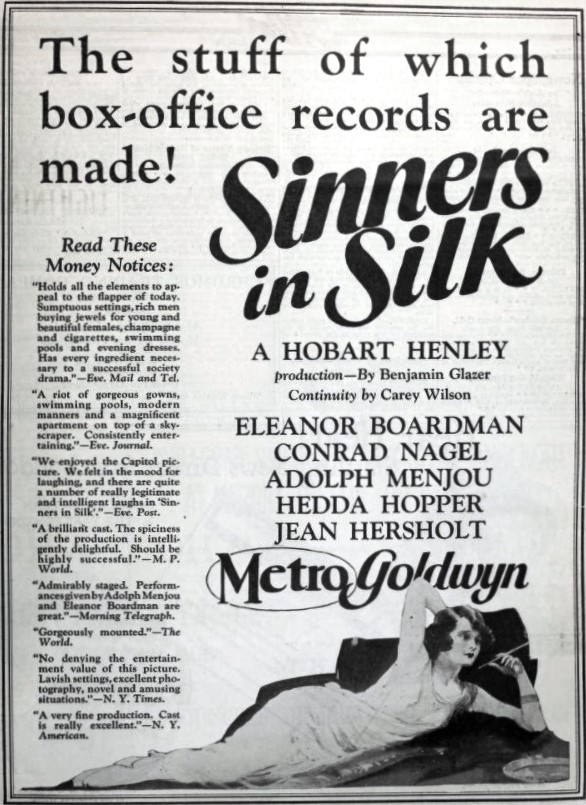
- Advertisement
- Directed by: Hobart Henley
- Written by: Benjamin Glazer and Carey Wilson
- Starring: Eleanor Boardman; Adolphe Menjou; Hedda Hopper; Conrad Nagel; Jean Hersholt
- Cinematography: John Arnold
- Distributed by: Metro-Goldwyn-Mayer
- Release date: September 1, 1924
- Running time: 60 minutes
- Country: United States
- Language: Silent (English intertitles)

Sinners in Silk is a 1924 silent romantic drama film directed by Hobart Henley. The film stars Eleanor Boardman, Adolphe Menjou, Hedda Hopper, Conrad Nagel, and Jean Hersholt. It was written by Benjamin Glazer and Carey Wilson.

The film at some point may have been under the working title Free Love.

== Plot ==
Arthur Merrill is a roué who continues to celebrate his rejuvenation surgery by taking a girl home - but she turns out to be the sweetheart of his son.

== Cast ==
- Adolphe Menjou as Arthur Merrill
- Eleanor Boardman as Penelope Stevens
- Conrad Nagel as Brock Farley
- Jean Hersholt as Dr. Eustace
- Edward Connelly as Bates
- Jerome Patrick as Jerry Hall
- John Patrick as Bowers
- Hedda Hopper as Mrs. Stevens
- Miss DuPont as Ynez
- Virginia Lee Corbin as Flapper
- Bradley Ward as Ted
- Dorothy Dwan as Rita
- Frank Elliott as Sir Donald Ramsey
- Anna Luther as Mimi (credited as Anne Luther)
- Peggy Elinor as Estelle
- Eugenia Gilbert as Chérie (credited as Eugenie Gilbert)
- Mary Akin as Peggy
- Estelle Clark as Carmelita

== Preservation ==
With no copies of Sinners in Silk located in any film archives, it is a lost film.
