= River Crest Sanitarium =

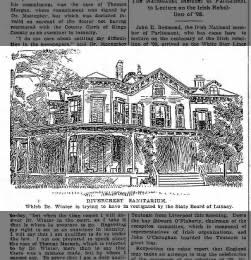
- Marketing post card issued by the hospital

Geography
- Location: Astoria,_Queens, New York, United States
- Coordinates: 40°46′45″N 73°54′48″W

Organization
- Care system: NY State Licensed
- Type: Specialist

Services
- Beds: 500
- Speciality: Disorders of the nervous system

Helipads
- Helipad: No

History
- Founded: 1896
- Closed: 1961
- Demolished: 1962

Links
- Lists: Hospitals in New York State

River Crest Sanitarium was a New York State licensed mental hospital located in Astoria, Queens. River Crest was founded in 1896 by John J. Kindred (1864-1937), a Virginia native who moved to Queens and was elected to the House of Representatives, serving from 1911 to 1913 and 1921 to 1929.

== History ==
The institution went out of business in 1961. "A high school now occupies the rear of the site," and a local restaurant is "named after the Sanitarium."

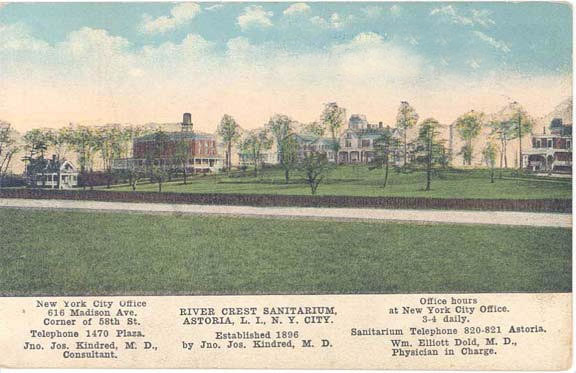
Brochure Postcard

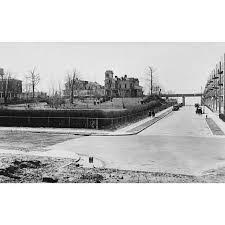
rear image

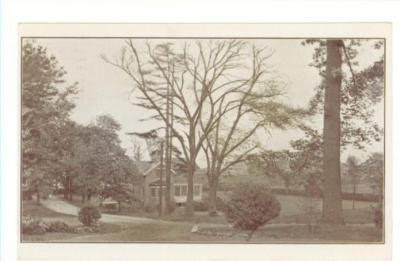
postcard image

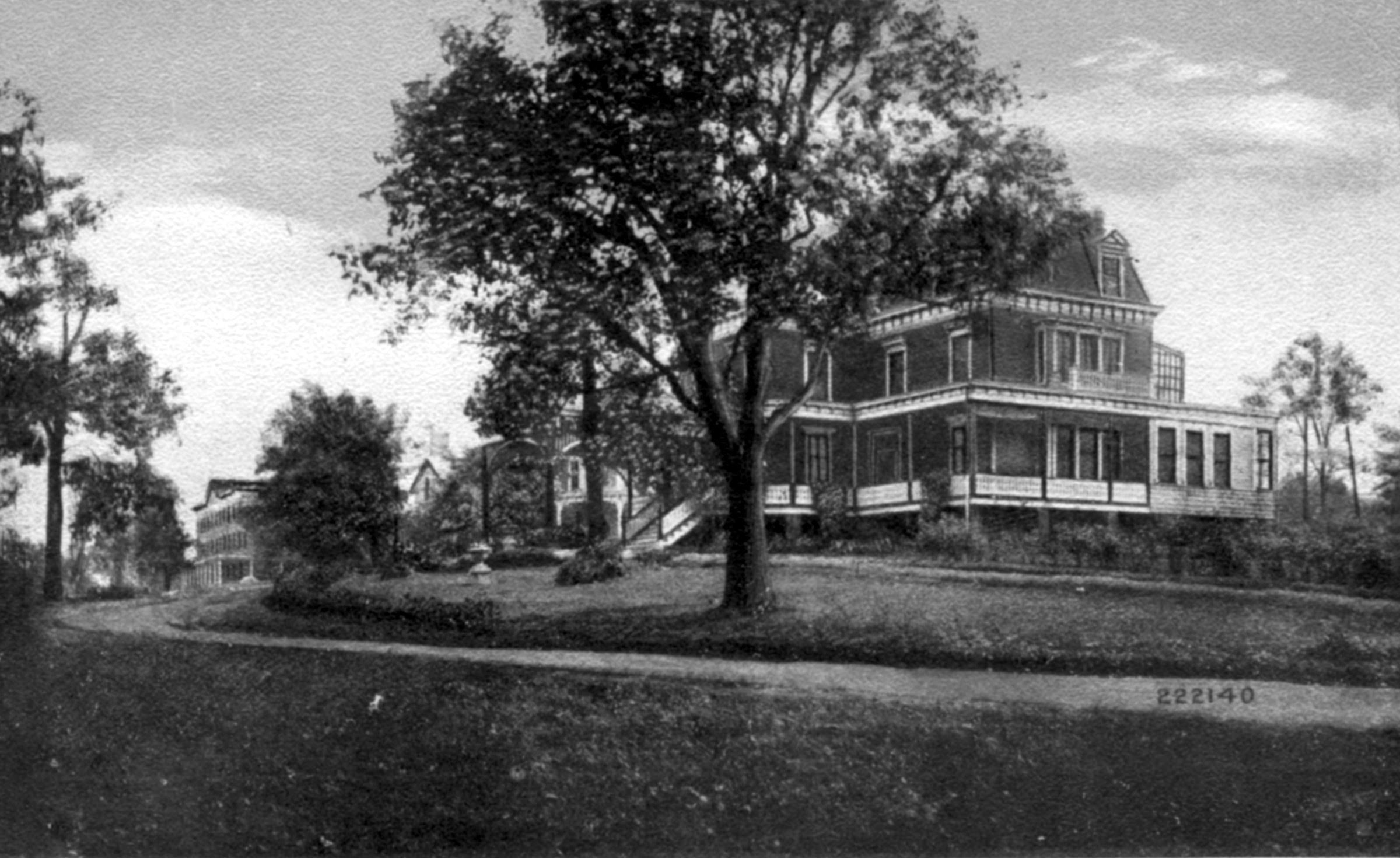
postcard image

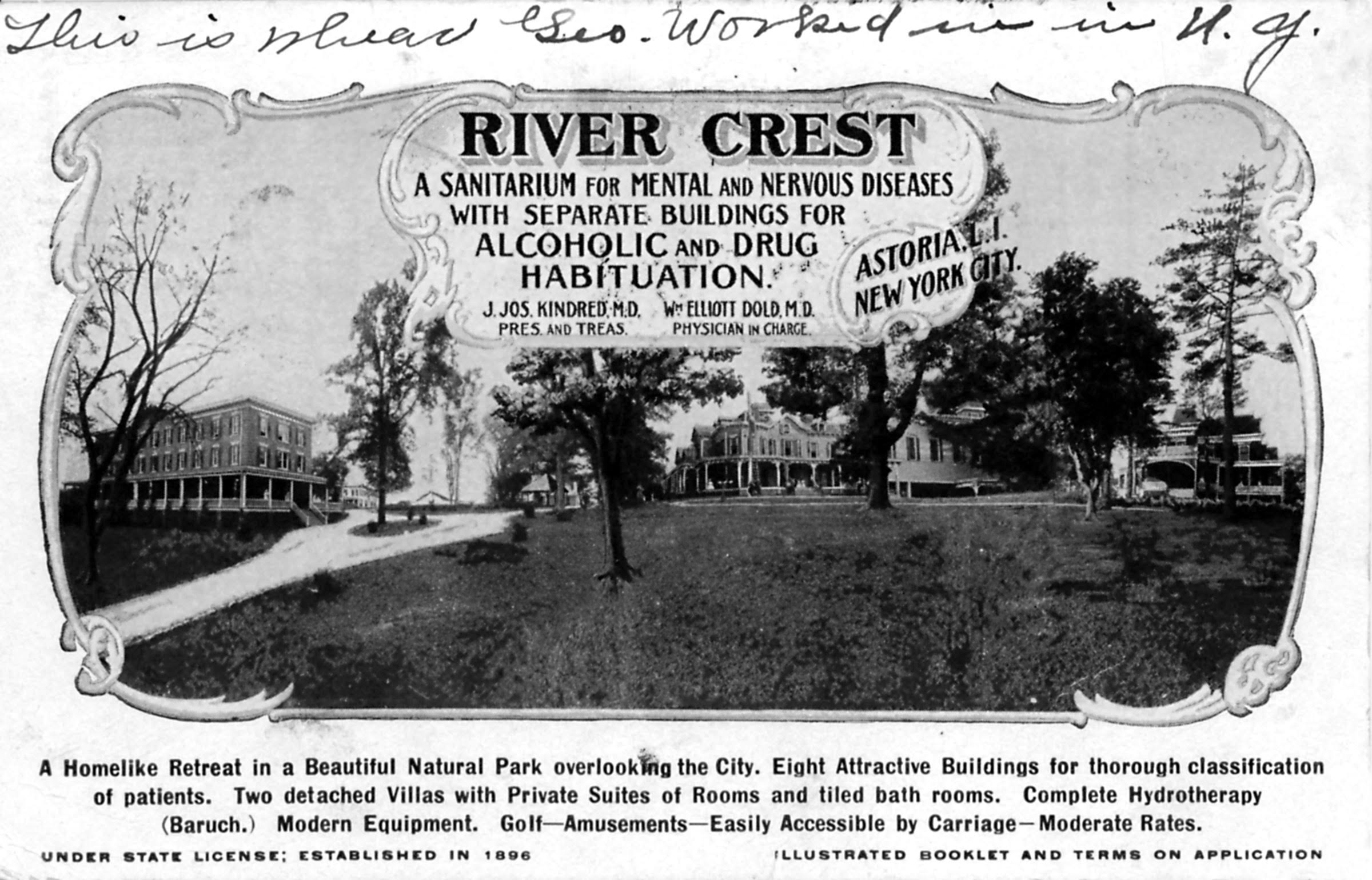
marketing brochure

== Notable patients ==
- Wilhelm Steinitz – World Chess Champion, 1900
- Thomas J. Callan – United States Army soldier, 1900
- Caitlin Thomas – wife of poet Dylan Thomas, after having come to see her dying husband at St Vincent's Hospital, in November 1953
