= Helen Gallagher Solomon =

Ziegfeld girl and restaurateur

Helen Gallagher
- Died: 1943
- Occupations: Ziegfeld girl, restaurateur
- Spouse(s): Ed Gallagher (m. ?–1929; his death) Jack Solomon (m. 1929)

Helen Gallagher Solomon (died 1943) was an American Ziegfeld girl and restaurateur who co-founded Gallagher's Steak House. She was the wife of Ed Gallagher (1873–1929), of the Gallagher and Shean comedy team.

She had been a Ziegfeld Girl until the mid-1920s and the wife of Ed Gallagher, who with Al Shean made up the comedy team of Gallagher and Shean. In November 1927 she and Jack Solomon, a colorful gambler with a large loyal following from the sporting element, opened Gallagher's at 228 West 52nd Street next door to the Alvin Theater. These were the days of Prohibition and Gallagher's was one of the first speakeasy gathering places for gamblers, sports figures, and stars of Broadway.

After Ed Gallagher's death, Helen remarried to Jack Solomon. She died from cancer in 1943 and her widower established the Helen Gallagher Cancer Fund to aid research.
