= Gallagher's Steakhouse =

Coordinates: 40°45′46.05″N 73°59′1.55″W

Gallaghers Steakhouse
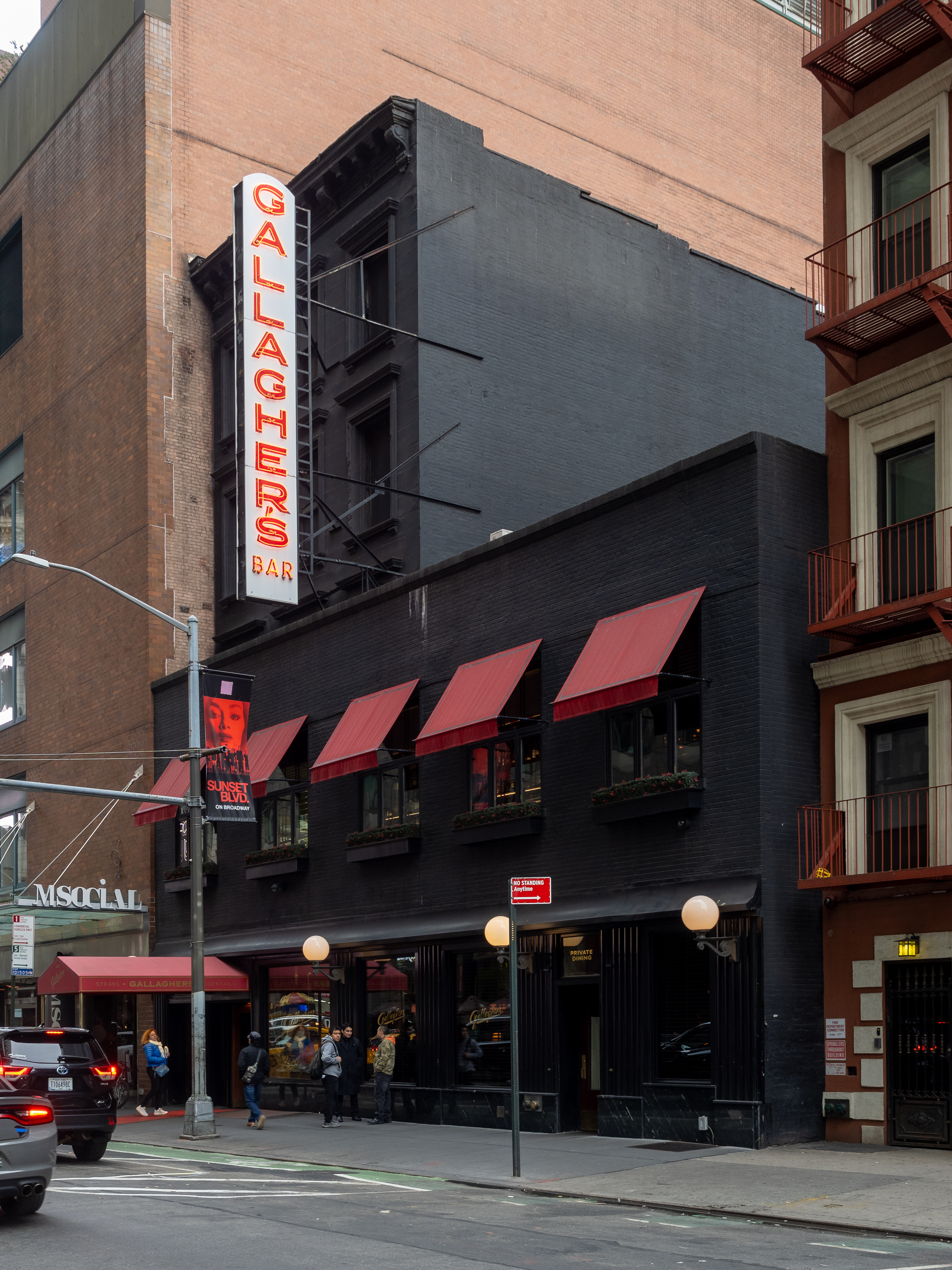
- Interactive map of Gallaghers Steakhouse

Restaurant information
- Established: November 1927; 98 years ago
- Owner: Dean Poll
- Food type: Steak
- Location: 228 West 52nd Street, in the Theater District, Manhattan, New York City, New York, United States

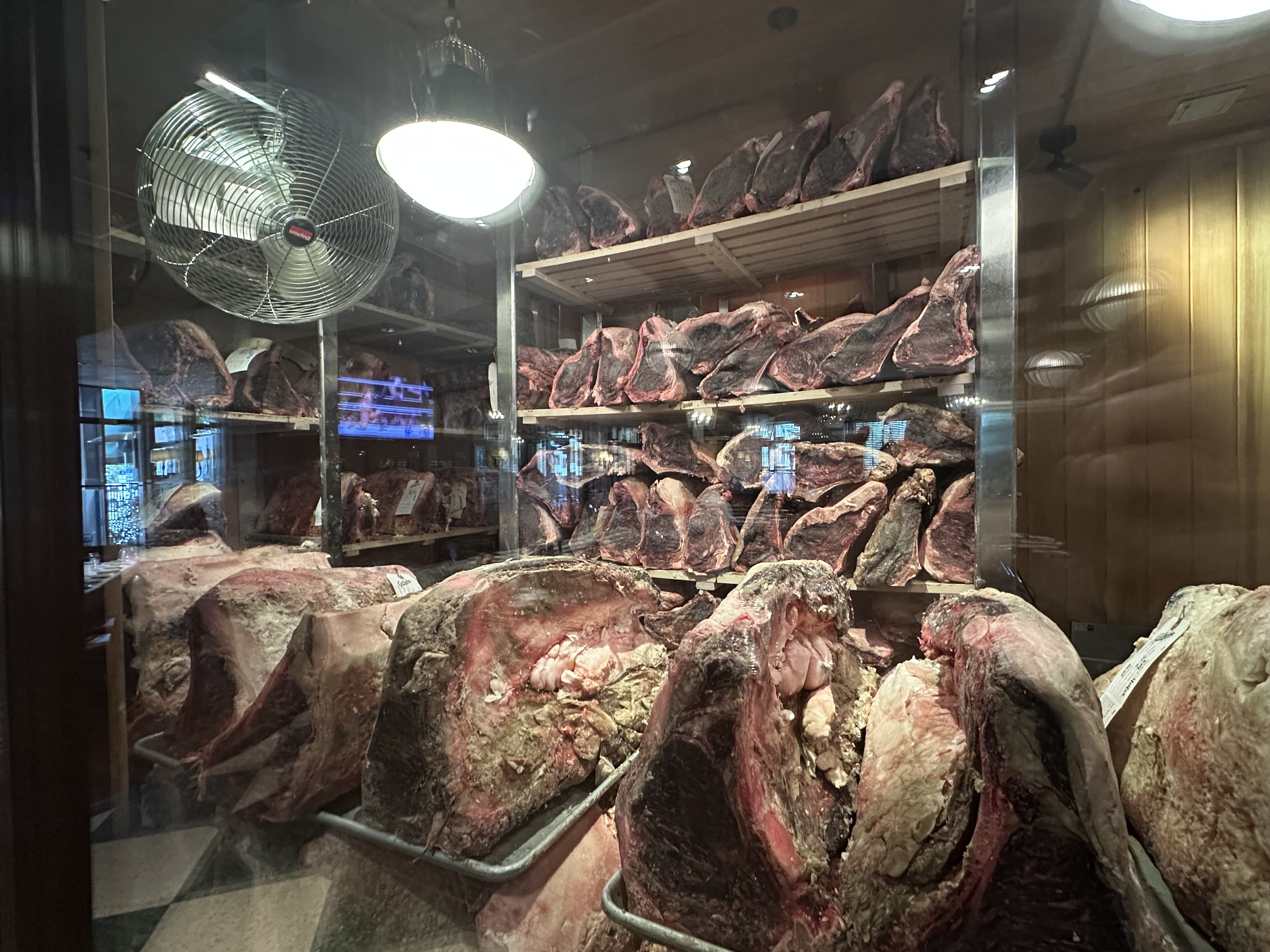
Dry age room at Gallagher's Steakhouse in Boca Raton, Florida

Gallagher's Steakhouse is a steakhouse restaurant at 228 West 52nd Street in the Theater District in Manhattan, New York City. It was founded in November 1927 by Helen Gallagher, a former Ziegfeld girl, and wife of Edward Gallagher (1873–1929), and Jack Solomon, a colorful gambler with a large loyal following from the sporting element. These were the days of Prohibition and Gallagher's was one of the first speakeasy gathering places for gamblers, sports figures, and stars of Broadway. There is now a location in the New York-New York Hotel & Casino in Las Vegas.

The restaurant opened on the same block as the Alvin Theatre (renamed Neil Simon Theatre in 1983), which opened a few days afterward.

== History ==
In 1933, President Franklin D. Roosevelt fulfilled his campaign promise to end Prohibition. With liquor now legal, Gallagher and Solomon brought a new style of steakhouse to Broadway. The establishment was basic and had the informal atmosphere of a speakeasy mixed with an American country inn. The walls were covered with photos of the stars of Broadway, Hollywood, business, politics, and athletes past and present. Even the stars of Belmont Park and Aqueduct Racetrack at Jamaica are honored.

When Helen died, Jack Solomon married Irene Hayes, who was also a former Ziegfeld girl and one of the top florists in Manhattan. Irene inherited the restaurant when Solomon died in 1963. She sold it not long after to Jeff Brody in 1964. Brody was the restaurateur responsible for the Rainbow Room and the Four Seasons.

== Contemporary times ==
In 2008, the menu at Gallagher's was changed by the new management. Most important among the changes was the removal and exclusion of Porterhouse steak, which once 'graced' the frozen windows of the meat locker that greets customers as they enter the restaurant. This caused some of Gallagher's old customers to complain about the removal of the Porterhouse, which some believe originated in New York.

Gallagher's Steakhouse was featured in the 2002 movie Monday Night Mayhem.

The Trophy Room is a space for business meetings, private dining or events. Located on the second floor it features a bar, real wood-paneled walls and an extensive photo collection. The Trophy Room accommodates 110 seated, 200 reception style, 100 theater style, and the entire restaurant 400 seated.

In January 2013, Gallagher's was purchased by Long Island restaurateur Dean Poll, who also owns Central Park's Loeb Boathouse. Gallagher's closed for renovations in July 2013.

Gallagher's Steakhouse re-opened in early February 2014 with a new menu, which includes the porterhouse, and renovated interior.

Staff at Gallagher's are represented by UNITE HERE Local 100.

== Franchise locations ==
- Gallaghers Steakhouse, New York City
- Gallagher's Steak House, Las Vegas
- Gallagher's Steak House, Atlantic City's Resorts International Hotel & Casino
- Gallagher's Steak House, Boca Raton

== See also ==
- List of restaurants in New York City
- List of steakhouses
