= Melting Millions (1917 film) =

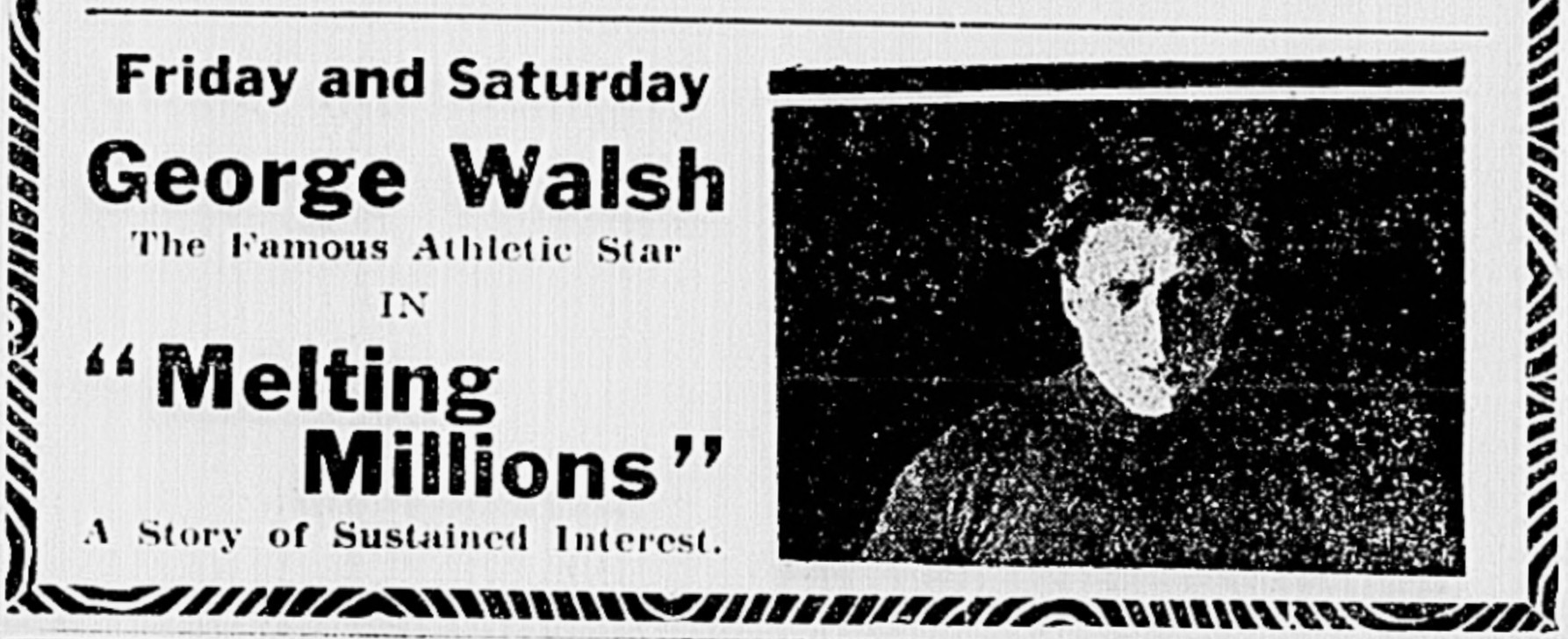
- Newspaper advertisement
- Directed by: Otis Turner
- Story by: Joseph Anthony Roach
- Starring: Sydney Deane; Cecil Holland; Velma Whitman; George Walsh; Frank Alexander
- Production company: Fox Film Corporation
- Distributed by: Fox Film Corporation
- Release date: February 19, 1917
- Running time: 5 reels
- Country: United States
- Languages: Silent film (English intertitles)

Melting Millions is a 1917 American silent comedy film directed by Otis Turner and starring Sydney Deane, Cecil Holland, Velma Whitman, George Walsh, and Frank Alexander. The film was released by Fox Film Corporation on February 19, 1917.

== Plot ==
Jack Ballentine, young and irresponsible, discovers that in order to inherit his uncle's fortune, he must prove to Mrs. Walton, his guardian, that he is a competent businessman. Jack, totally devoid of any business acumen, doesn't hit one. Escaped to the West, he saves a girl and her father from a gang of robbers, while Mrs. Walton freezes his bank accounts, leaving him penniless. The young man proves brave, however, when he saves Jane, the girl, from being kidnapped by her father's former secretary, thus finally winning the approval of Mrs. Walton.

== Cast ==
- Sydney Deane as Uncle Peter
- Cecil Holland as Casey
- Velma Whitman as Mrs. Wilson
- George Walsh as Jack Ballentine
- Frank Alexander as Bailey
- Anna Luther as Jane
- Charles K. Gerrard as Hamilton

== Preservation ==
The film is now considered lost.
