= Nabonga =

1944 film by Sam Newfield

- Original film poster
- Directed by: Sam Newfield
- Written by: Fred Myton
- Produced by: Sigmund Newfield
- Starring: Buster Crabbe; Julie London; Barton MacLane; Fifi D'Orsay; Prince Modupe
- Cinematography: Robert E. Cline
- Music by: Willy Stahl
- Distributed by: PRC
- Release date: January 25, 1944
- Running time: 75 minutes
- Country: United States
- Language: English

Nabonga is a 1944 PRC film starring Buster Crabbe and Julie London (in her film debut). It was retitled Jungle Woman in the British Empire.

== Plot ==
T. F. Stockwell steals the money and jewelry contents of safe deposit boxes of the Cairo bank in which he works. After fleeing south in a private plane with his young daughter Doreen and the pilot, they're brought down in the jungle during a storm. The three survive the crash but Stockwell murders the pilot when he sees the stolen loot. Whilst exploring the surroundings, Doreen finds a gorilla wounded and left for dead by members of a safari.

Years pass when Ray Gorman comes to the area on the fringes of the jungle where the plane crashed. Bar owner Carl Hurst and his female associate Marie spy on Gorman to see what he's up to.

Gorman's father was head of the bank that Stockwell worked for and robbed; when Gorman's father was blamed for the theft he committed suicide. Gorman is out to recover the loot from the plane crash to clear his father's name. When Gorman saves Hurst's servant Tobo from being murdered by another African, Tobo confides in Gorman that there is a white witch in the jungle who legend has it came from the sky. Gorman realises that this could be a reference to Stockwell's plane crash and disappearance. Tobo offers to lead Gorman to the area whilst Hurst and Marie secretly follow.

The "white witch" is the grown up Doreen living with her gorilla named Samson who protects her; her father having long ago disappeared in the jungle.

== Cast ==
=== Main ===
- Buster Crabbe as Ray Gorman
- Julie London as Doreen Stockwell
- Barton MacLane as Carl Hurst
- Fifi D'Orsay as Marie
- Bryant Washburn as White Hunter
- Herbert Rawlinson as T.F. Stockwell

=== Supporting ===
- Prince Modupe as Tobo
- Jackie Newfield as Doreen Stockwell, as a child
- Ray Corrigan as Samson the Gorilla (as Nbongo)

=== Cameo/Uncredited ===
- Jack Gardner as Pilot
- I. Stanford Jolley as Policeman
- Edmund Mortimer as Trader
- Fred 'Snowflake' Toones as Native Attacking Tobo

== Production ==
French West Africa-born Prince Modupe, according to his autobiography, was a Hollywood technical advisor on African films such as Sundown and The Snows of Kilimanjaro. He gives not only a highly sympathetic portrayal of an African, but one who is a friend rather than a servant of Crabbe. In addition to fighting men and a crocodile, Crabbe displays amusing Bob Hope-type comedy when frightened by Julie London's killer gorilla.
