= Anthony Devas =

British painter (1911–1958)

- Devas in 1957
- Born: Anthony Devas; 8 January 1911; Bromley, Kent, England
- Died: 21 December 1958 (aged 47); London, England
- Education: Slade School of Fine Art
- Known for: Portrait painting
- Spouse: Nicolette Macnamara (m. 1931)
- Relatives: Caitlin Thomas (sister-in-law)

Thomas Anthony Devas (8 January 1911 – 21 December 1958) was a British portrait painter who was associated with members of the Euston Road School.

== Early life ==
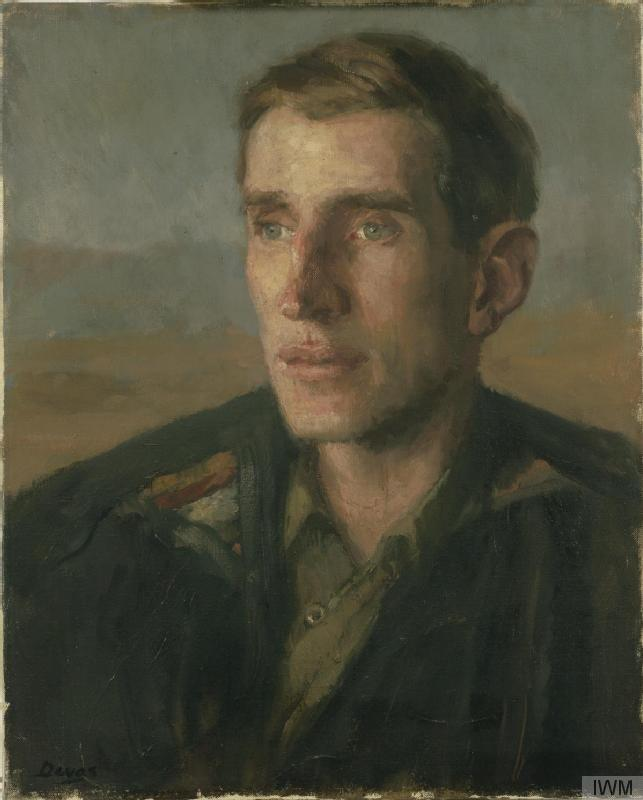
Major Wilfred Thesiger, (1944), (Imperial War Museum)

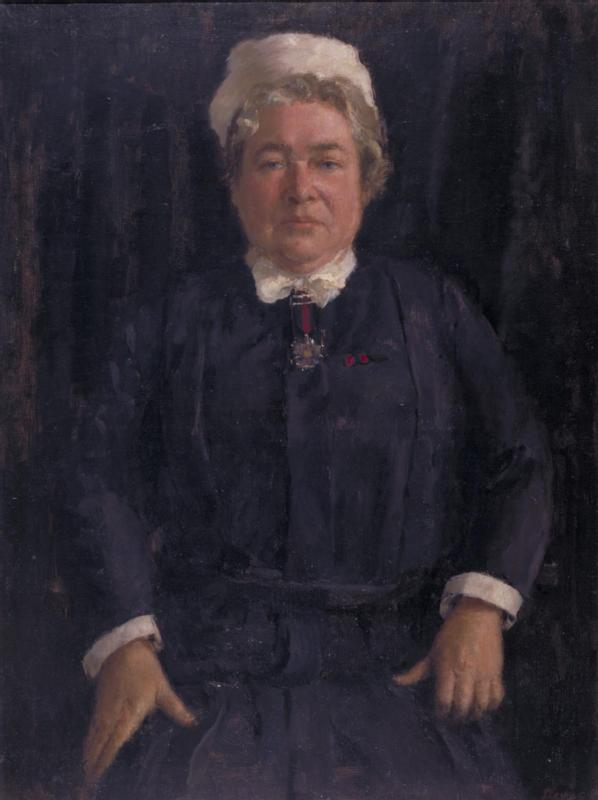
Miss M S Cochrane, RRC, SRN, Matron, Charing Cross Hospital (Art.IWM ART LD1472)

Thomas Anthony Devas, known as Anthony, was born in Bromley in Kent, on 8 January 1911, the second of four children to Thomas Gronow Devas, the chairman of the Devas Routledge textile firm, and Marjorie Cecilia Watson. Devas attended Repton School and entered the Slade School of Fine Art in 1927, aged 16. At the Slade he studied alongside Rodrigo Moynihan, William Coldstream and Robin Darwin. In 1931 Devas married his fellow Slade student Nicolette Macnamara, whose sister Caitlin would later marry Dylan Thomas. Through the Macnamara sisters Devas met, and was influenced in his portrait painting by, Augustus John.

== World War II ==
During the Second World War, Devas served as an air raid warden in London as his persistent ill-health had excluded him from military service. Devas held his first major solo exhibition at the Agnew's Gallery in 1941 and he continued with his portrait painting, most notably with portraits of both Nicolette and Caitlin and also his friend Laurie Lee. The War Artists' Advisory Committee, WAAC, commissioned several portraits from Devas of individuals who had distinguished themselves in the conflict, including Wilfred Thesiger, Captain George Hunt and dispatch rider Pamela McGeorge, At other points in the war WAAC purchased a number of portraits from Devas, including one of the Matron of Charing Cross Hospital.

== Later life ==
After the war Devas's reputation as a society portrait painter continued to grow. In 1943 he became a member of the New English Art Club and in 1945 he was elected to the Royal Society of Portrait Painters. Devas was elected an Associate member of the Royal Academy in 1953. He lived and worked at the Rossetti Studios in Chelsea and at one time shared studio space with the artist Norman Hepple.

During the 1950s Devas produced at least nine portraits of young women for the Aero Girls advertising campaign run by J Walter Thompson for Rowntree's chocolate. Other commissions included a portrait of Sir George Dyson for the Royal College of Music in 1952 and a portrait of Elizabeth II in 1957. Devas's final public commission was of Peggy Ashcroft for the Royal Shakespeare Theatre and was first shown, posthumously, at the Royal Academy in 1959.

After a prolonged period of heart troubles Devas died of a stroke at his home in December 1958. He is buried at Putney Vale Cemetery in London. His epitaph reads "He was a rare man". A memorial exhibition was held at the Agnew's Gallery in 1959. Several years later, his widow Nicolette married the artist Rupert Shephard.
