= Aeronwy Thomas =

English translator (1943–2009)

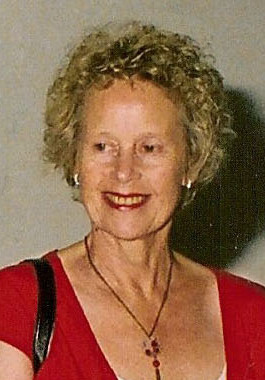
- Thomas in 2006
- Born: Aeronwy Bryn Thomas; 3 March 1943; London, England
- Died: 27 July 2009 (aged 66); New Malden, London, England
- Other name: Aeronwy Ellis
- Education: Isleworth College (BA)
- Occupations: Poet, writer and poetry translator
- Spouse: Trefor Ellis
- Children: 2
- Parent(s): Dylan Thomas; Caitlin Macnamara
- Relatives: Nicolette Macnamara (maternal aunt); Gwilym Marles (paternal great-granduncle)

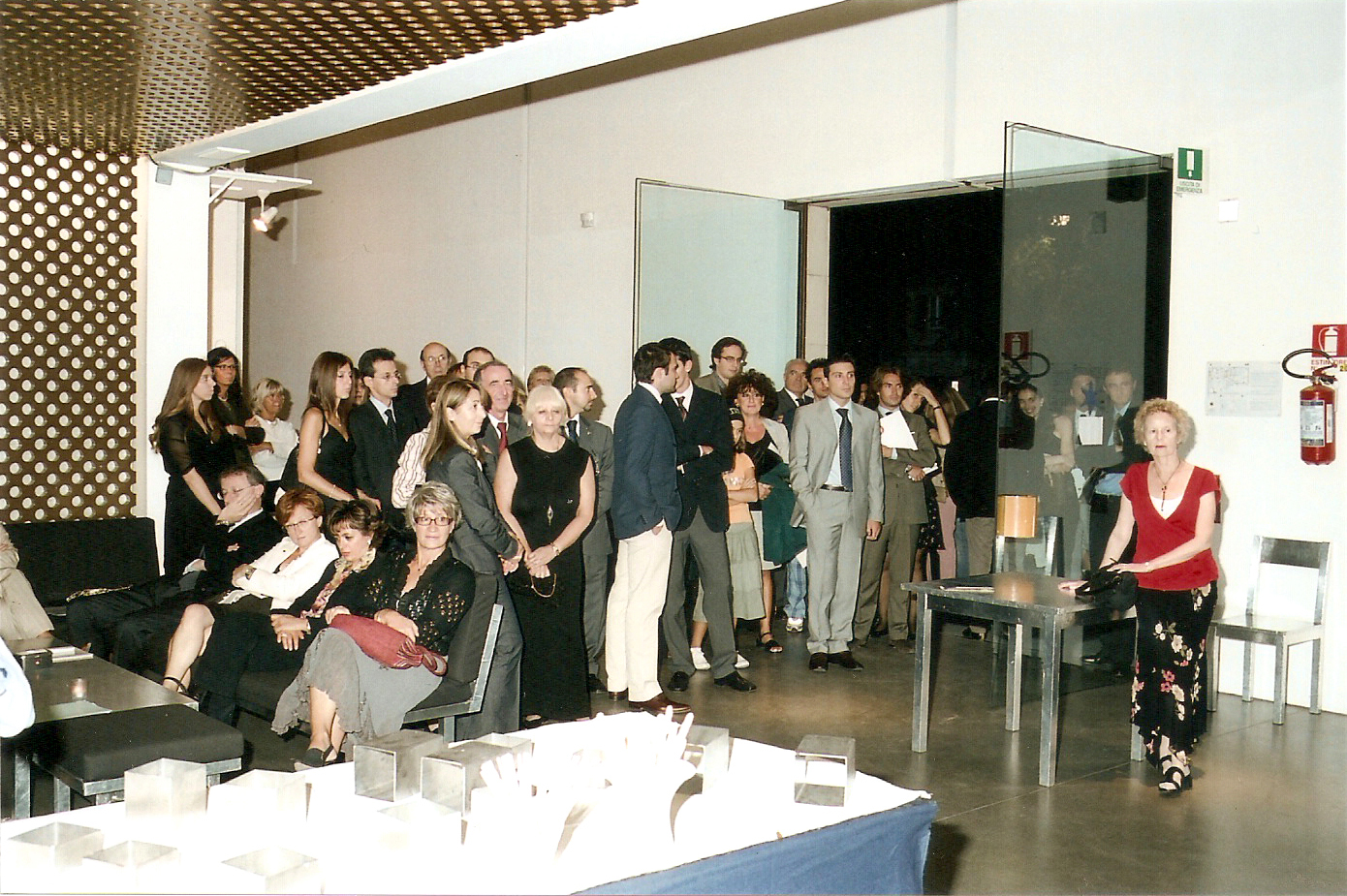
Aeronwy Thomas' Poetry Reading in Turin, Italy, 2006

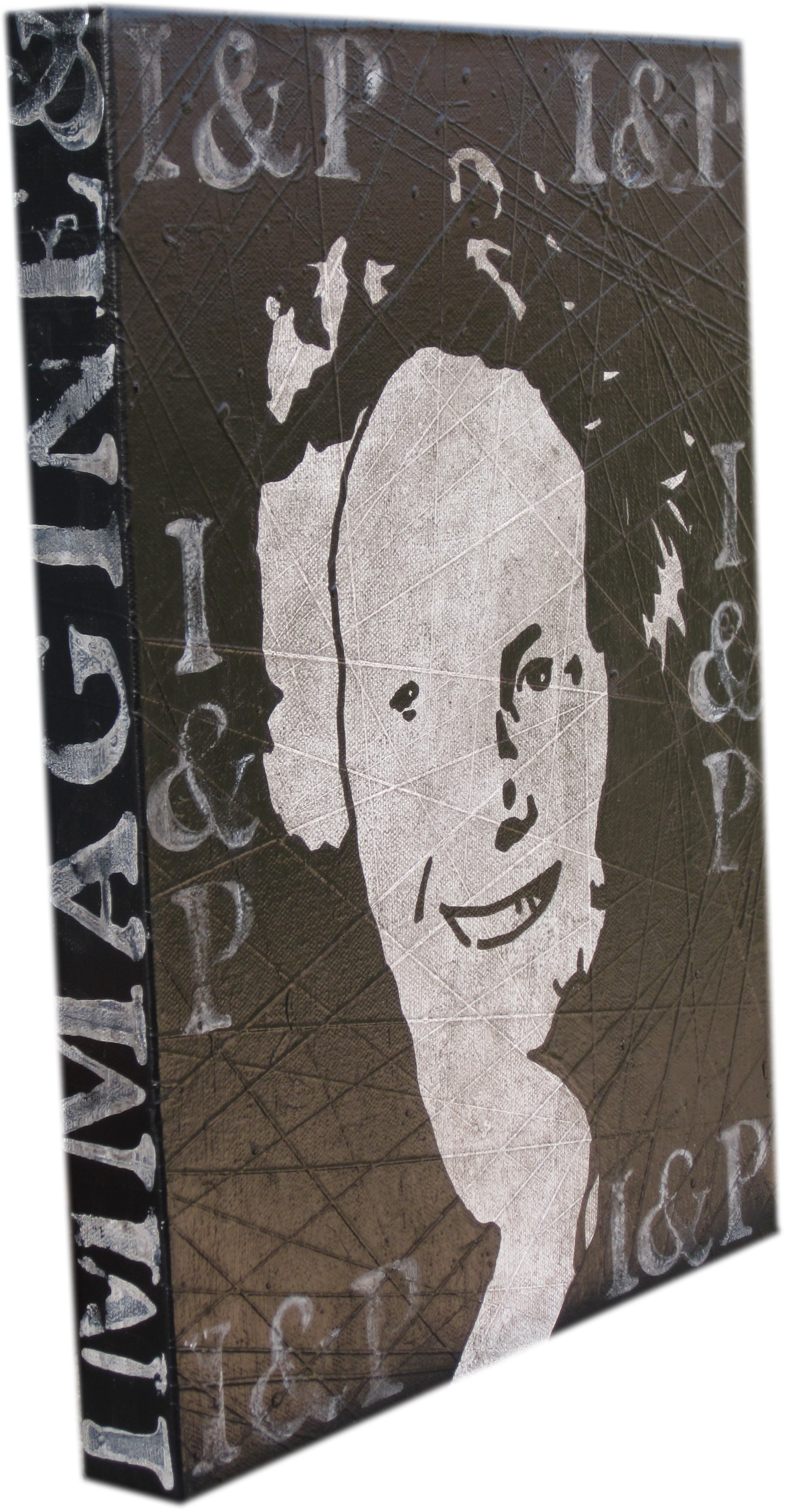
Homage to Aeronwy Thomas, painting by Davide Binello, 2011

Aeronwy Bryn Thomas-Ellis (/ˈaɪrɒnwi/; 3 March 1943 – 27 July 2009) was a poet, writer and translator of Italian poetry. She was the second child and only daughter of the Welsh poet Dylan Thomas and his wife, Caitlin Macnamara.

== Life ==
Born in London, Thomas was named after the River Aeron in Cardiganshire, Wales, the banks of which are near the home of her parents. She had two brothers, Llewelyn and Colm. In 1942 and 1943, they lived intermittently in Plas Gelli, Talsarn. Between September 1944 and July 1945, Thomas lived with her parents in a bungalow called Majoda, which overlooks the sea in New Quay, Cardiganshire.

In May 1949, the family moved to the Boat House, Laugharne, Carmarthenshire, Wales. At the age of 10, Thomas was enrolled by her mother at the Arts Educational School in Tring, Hertfordshire which is now Tring Park School for the Performing Arts. She was at Dartington Hall School in Devon for one year in 1958. After her father's death in 1953, she and her mother went to Rome, later moving to Sicily after her mother began a relationship with her long-term partner Giuseppe Fazio.

Thomas earned a bachelor's degree in English and comparative religion at Isleworth College, as well as a TEFL diploma at Woking Adult Education College. In 2003 she was awarded an honorary fellowship from the University of Wales, Swansea.

=== Career ===
After learning Italian, she became a translator of Italian poetry. She was also known for being an ambassador for her father's work, and as a patron of the Dylan Thomas Society. She was the President of the Alliance of Literary Societies.

A much sought-after visiting professor in schools and universities in the UK and abroad, in the late 1990s she was highly popular with the students of Giuseppe Perotti School in Turin, Italy, for her distance-learning "creative writing" courses. In 2007 she became President of Immagine & Poesia (Image and Poetry), an artistic literary movement founded at Teatro Alfa in Turin.

=== Personal life ===
She and her husband Trefor Ellis had two children: a son, Huw Dylan, and a daughter, Hannah.

=== Death ===
Aeronwy Thomas died of cancer on 27 July 2009 in New Malden, London, aged 66.

== Works ==
- Later than Laugharne (Celtion, 1976)
- Christmas and Other Memories (Amwy Press, 1978)
- Poems and Memories (Pedrini, Turin)
- Christmas in the Boathouse (2003)
- Rooks and Poems (Poetry Monthly Press, 2004)
- A daughter remembers Dylan (Merton Books, 2006) – an expanded version of the booklet Christmas and Other Memories
- I Colori Delle Parole (Rotaract, 2007) – includes poems by Aeronwy Thomas and paintings by Gianpiero Actis (in Italian and English)
- Away With Words – an anthology of poetry – includes poems by Aeronwy Thomas, Beryl Myers, Anne Taylor, Frances White (Poetry Monthly Press, 2007)
- Burning Bridges (Cross-Cultural Communications, Merrick, New York, 2008)
- Shadows and Shades – Selected Poems (Poetry Monthly Press, 2009)
- My Father's Places (Constable, 2009)
- Nightwatch (17 poems) in Poet to Poet #3 (The Seventh Quarry, 2010)
