= Left Over Life to Kill =

Left Over Life To Kill

EP by The Paradise Motel
- Released: 1996 (Australia); 1997 (UK)
- Recorded: Seneca Studio, Melbourne, Australia
- Genres: Dream pop, acoustic, indie, noir
- Length: 25:10 and 50:44
- Labels: Mushroom Records, Infectious Records
- Producer: The Paradise Motel

The Paradise Motel chronology
Left Over Life To Kill (1996)	Still Life (1997)

Left Over Life To Kill is both an EP and an album released by the Australian band The Paradise Motel, released in 1996 and 1997 respectively. Lyrics and most music was written by Charles Bickford with arrangements by Matt Aulich. These were the band's debut. The title comes from Caitlin Thomas autobiography.

== EP ==
The EP was released by Mushroom Records in Australia in 1996 on both CD and 10-inch vinyl.

The EP reached number 2 on the Australian Alternative Charts and became the third highest selling alternative release of 1996.

=== Track listing ===
Left Over Life To Kill
No.	Title	Length
1.	"Jack Star"	4:46
2.	"Serpent Intro"	1:25
3.	"German Girl"	4:25
4.	"Ashes"	6:09
5.	"Un Tombé Mauvais"	0.58
6.	"Never Beautiful"	4:52

This was soon followed by a remix EP, entitled 'Some Deaths Take Forever', which consisted of experimental remixes of tracks and outtakes from Left Over Life To Kill, an interpretation of The Triffids' song Raining Pleasure and was also produced by the band themselves. 2,000 hand-numbered copies were produced and soon sold out. These and many subsequent releases by The Paradise Motel were noted for their stylistic uniformity, reminiscent of Penguin Books' Penguin Classics series.

== LP ==
Also released on Mushroom/Infectious this release accompanied the band's relocation to the UK the following year. It contains four songs from their earlier EP (Please Keep Me Safe), Ashes from their first EP and five songs from their Australian album Still Life. Following positive praise from the UK press, the band accompanied its release with a promotional tour of mainland Europe and the UK.

=== Track listing ===
Left Over Life To Kill
No.	Title	Length
1.	"Calling You"	4:35
2.	"Dead Skin"	5:31
3.	"Men Who Loved Her (Grew Sadder)"	6:43
4.	"Watch Illuminum"	4:34
5.	"Skip Bins"	3:04
6.	"Desperate Plan"	4:52
7.	"Bad Light"	5:17
8.	"German Girl"	4:25
9.	"Ashes"	6:09
10.	"Stones"	6:31
