= Pamela McGeorge =

Women's Royal Naval Service motorcycle dispatch rider during World War II

Pamela Betty McGeorge BEM was a Women's Royal Naval Service motorcycle dispatch rider during World War II.

== Early life ==
Pamela Betty McGeorge was born on 29 October 1918, in Edgebaston, to Mabel Maud (née Cooper) and John McGeorge. She was baptised at St Bartholomew's Church, Edgbaston on 30 November 1918. Her father was a surveyor of taxes.

== Second World War ==
McGeorge initially joined the Women's Land Army aged 20, in 1939, having been at physical training college. She resigned to join the Women's Royal Naval Service.

On 30 September 1941, when a WREN third officer, she received the British Empire Medal, for bravery in carrying urgent despatches on foot in an air raid. She delivered a despatch to a command post at the naval shipyards in Devonport, Plymouth on 22 April 1940, after being thrown from her motorcycle by a German bomb during the air raid, then volunteering for more despatch duty. McGeorge had been a Sea Ranger. She underwent training WREN's officer training at Greenwich and was promoted to acting second officer on 29 January 1944 and was listed as a second officer in the Women's Royal Navy (Supplementary) Reserve in 1960.

A portrait of McGeorge by British painter Anthony Devas is in the collection of The Hepworth Wakefield.

== Later life ==
McGeorge settled in the family home in Cheltenham after the war.

== Sources ==
- Woodward, Lyn (June 2019), "War birds: the female dispatch riders of wartime England", Motorcyclist, Bonnier Corporation, ISSN 0027-2205
- Costello, J. (1987). Virtue Under Fire: How World War II Changed Our Social and Sexual Attitudes. Fromm International Publishing Corporation. ISBN 978-0-88064-070-1.
- Roberts, H. (2017). The WRNS in Wartime: The Women's Royal Naval Service 1917-1955. I.B.Tauris. ISBN 978-1-78672-325-3.
- Wadge, D.C. (2003). Women in Uniform. Women in wartime series. Imperial War Museum, Department of Printed Books. ISBN 978-1-901623-61-1.
- Imperial War Museum (1989). Union Jack: a scrapbook : British forces' newspapers 1939-1945. Her Majesty's Stationery Office in association with the Imperial War Museum. ISBN 978-0-11-772628-4.
- Pamela McGeorge, BEM, of the Women's Royal Naval Service by Anthony Devas (Artworks database), Art UK
