= Blashford =

Village in Hampshire, England

Coordinates: 50.860877°N 1.788874°W

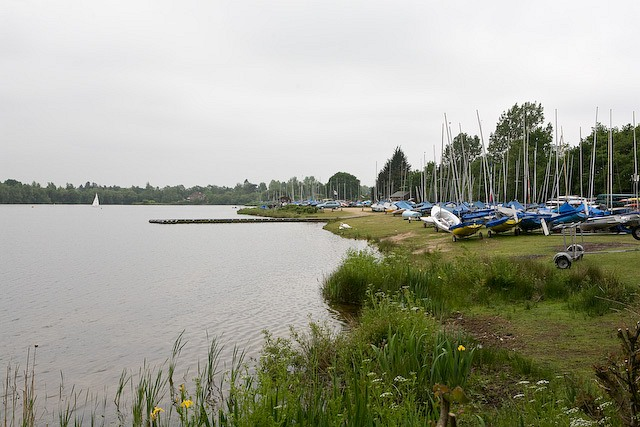
- Spinnaker Sailing Club on Blashford Lake.

- Location within Hampshire
- OS grid reference: SU1495606840
- District: New Forest
- Shire county: Hampshire
- Region: South East
- Country: England
- Sovereign state: United Kingdom
- Post town: RINGWOOD
- Postcode district: BH24
- Dialling code: 01425
- Police: Hampshire and Isle of Wight
- Fire: Hampshire and Isle of Wight
- Ambulance: South Central
- UK Parliament: New Forest West

Blashford is a small hamlet of approx. 65 dwellings situated close to the New Forest National Park in Hampshire, England. Its nearest town is Ringwood, which lies approximately 1 mile (1.6 km) south from the village. It is in the civil parish of Ellingham, Harbridge and Ibsley.

In the late 1900s the area was subject to a series of gravel extractions and became a landscape of interconnecting open lakes and wet meadows. The area has recovered spectacularly since the days of gravel extraction and become a haven for all sorts of wildlife, including waterfowl, bats, otters and moths.

Blashford is home to the Blashford Lakes Nature Reserve. The 490 acres (200 ha) wildlife reserve is managed by the Wildlife Trust in partnership with the New Forest District Council and landowners Wessex Water and Bournemouth and West Hampshire Water. Blashford Lakes is an internationally important site for thousands of wildfowl. Its importance is recognised by its SSSI, Ramsar, SPA (Special Protection Area) and SINC (Site of Importance for Nature Conservation) protection status. Several other parts of Blashford also have this status, including open lakes and the River Avon and associated flood plain. Linking these sites is an area of wetland known locally as Blashford Wet Meadows.

== History ==
=== The Hales Family ===
Blashford House (built 1600) was owned by the Hales family of Coventry, a younger branch of the Hales of Woodchurch. Sir John Hales, of Whitefriars Coventry and Blashford, (grandson of John Hales), was made a baronet in 1660. The 5th Baronet (also called John) lived in Blashford and his obituary states he died in Blashford in 1802 after an unpleasant illness. He was succeeded in turn by his three sons, and the Baronetcy ended with the death of his youngest son Sir Christopher Hales (1785-1806).

Blashford House was then inherited by Rev. Dr Christopher Taylor (d 1822), descended from Sir Christopher Hales’ great aunt Elizabeth. He married Mary Lisle of Moyles Court, descended from Alice Lisle whose portrait hangs in the Houses of Parliament, and inherited the title of Lord of the Manor of Ellingham from his wife's family. A plaque to his memory is displayed in Ellingham Church, where also the grave of Alice Lisle can be found. The title of Lord of the Manor was sold by his son Edward Hayles Taylor to the Earl of Normanton, whose descendants hold the title today. (The property now called Blashford Manor has no historical connection with the Lord of the Manor, but has been renamed recently).

=== The Dylan Thomas connection ===
Noted Blashford residents were the Macnamara family and their son-in-law, Dylan Thomas.

Francis Macnamara (1886–1946) was a poet and lived in New Inn House (now demolished) with his wife Yvonne, and his daughters Nicolette (Devas), Caitlin and Brigit. They enjoyed an unconventional Bohemian lifestyle with Augustus John, who lived in nearby Fordingbridge, a regular visitor. During this time Francis moved out and Nora Summers, the photographer, became a regular visitor. There are many photographs of the area in the book of Nora's photographs, particularly of Caitlin and the nearby River Avon. After Francis left, Nora became Yvonne Macnamara's lover In 1937 Caitlin married Dylan Thomas and the couple lived at Blashford until they moved to Wales in 1938.
