= George Hunt (Royal Navy officer) =

Captain George Hunt DSO & Bar DSC & Bar
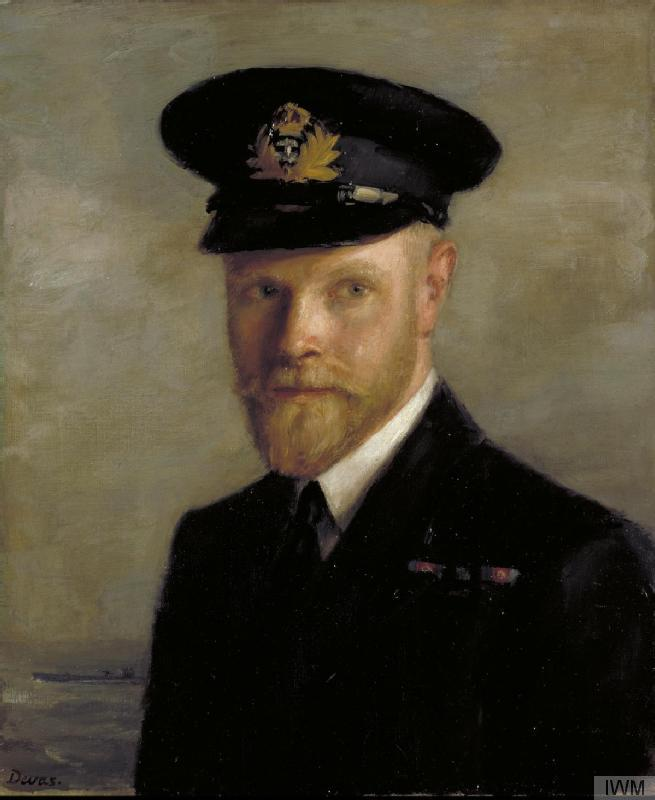
- Lieutenant Commander GE Hunt, DSO, DSC, RN by Anthony Devas (1945)
- Born: 4 July 1916; Milton of Campsie, Scotland
- Died: 16 August 2011 (aged 95); Brisbane, Australia
- Military career
- Allegiance: United Kingdom
- Branch: Merchant Navy (1929–38); Royal Navy Reserve (1930–38); Royal Navy (1938–62)
- Service years: 1929–1962
- Rank: Captain
- Commands: HMS H33 (1942); HMS Ultor (1943–44); HMS Taku (1944–45); HMS Ambush (1947); Admiralty Underwater Detection Establishment (1954–56); HMS Bigbury Bay (1956–57); 7th Frigate Squadron (1956–58)
- Conflicts: Second World War: Battle of the Mediterranean; Battle of Anzio
- Awards: Distinguished Service Order & Bar; Distinguished Service Cross & Bar; Mentioned in Despatches (2)
- Other work: British High Commission in Australia

Captain George Edward Hunt, DSO & Bar, DSC & Bar (4 July 1916 – 16 August 2011) was a highly decorated Royal Navy submarine commander during the Second World War. While commanding HMS Ultor, he became the British submarine commander with the greatest number of sinkings of enemy vessels to his name, though David Wanklyn achieved sinkings of greater tonnage. Of the 68 torpedoes Hunt fired, 47% hit their targets.

== Early life ==
George Edward Hunt was born in Milton of Campsie, East Dumbartonshire, Scotland, where his family owned a calico printing works in the town, However he was raised in Kampala in the British Protectorate of Uganda until the age of seven, where his father John was a chartered accountant in the Colonial Service. His parents then sent him back to Scotland to live with relatives and study at St Ninian's Preparatory School in Moffat until he was 13 and a half years of age.

=== Nautical education ===
In January 1930, while still 13, he entered HMS Conway as an officer cadet in the RNR (Royal Naval Reserve), graduating as a senior cadet in August 1932 with a nomination to midshipman RNR.

At the age of 16, he became an indentured cadet in the Merchant navy, joining the Henderson Line, serving first on board the SS Arracan then later on the SS Henzada as a senior cadet, both ships plying between Great Britain and the Burma.

In 1935, he joined the light cruiser HMS Achilles for RNR service as a midshipman. Her commanding officer, Captain Colin Cantlie, had been a submariner during World War I and his enthusiasm for the Submarine Service was to influence Hunt's future career and that of other midshipmen on board, five out of eight of whom subsequently joined the Submarine Service.

In 1936, Hunt returned to Glasgow to study for his second mate's certificate. There he met his future wife, Phoebe Silson, who had been born in South Africa and was in Scotland furthering her studies in physiotherapy. After gaining his second mate's certificate, he joined the Blue Funnel Line, on the SS Leomedon voyaging to the Far East.

== Royal Navy service ==
Hunt trained as a sub-lieutenant on board the cruiser HMS Sheffield for several months in 1937 culminating in being invited to transfer from part-time service in the RNR to permanent commission in the Royal Navy, which he accepted, later applying for and being accepted for the Submarine Service, commencing training in HMS Dolphin on 1 January 1939.

=== Service in submarines ===
During the Second World War, Hunt served in the submarines HMS Unity as navigation and signals officer, HMS H31 as first lieutenant, the Dutch submarine HNLMS O 10 as liaison officer, HMS Urchin as first lieutenant while under construction then as liaison officer when she commissioned under Polish command as the ORP Sokół, HMS Proteus as first lieutenant, HMS H33 as captain, HMS H50 as captain, HMS Ultor as captain and HMS Taku as captain.

=== Most sinkings ===
It was during his service as captain of the submarine Ultor that he achieved the record of sinking the highest number of ships sunk by any British submarine during the war. During her seventeen patrols, Ultor sank or destroyed over 50,000 tons of Axis shipping. Admiralty records of 5 September 1944 show 20 vessels sunk, two damaged by torpedo, and 10 sunk by gunfire (including one destroyed on the stocks), giving a total of 30 vessels sunk and two damaged. In addition, Ultor took part in one bombardment, one beach-marking and one special operation. In achieving this record, Ultor carried out 27 torpedo attacks, of which 23 were successful, a success rate of 85.2 per cent. She fired 68 torpedoes, of which 32 were hits (plus two possibilities), a success rate of 47 per cent, which was the highest rate of any British submarine.

Counting his time in other submarines, Hunt carried out 32 patrols.

While serving at the Staff College in Greenwich in 1945, Hunt was honoured to be one of two submariners selected by the Admiralty to have their portraits painted for the War Artists' Advisory Committee by the celebrated Official War Artist Anthony Devas. The portrait remains on display in the Imperial War Museum.

== Post-war service in the Royal Navy ==
In 1945 Hunt, now a lieutenant commander, was appointed to the aircraft carrier HMS Triumph as first lieutenant. In March 1947, he took command of the submarine HMS Ambush, remaining in that appointment until January 1948. His next appointment was as commanding officer of the Submarine Commanding Officers' Qualifying Course, during which time he was promoted to commander. In 1952, he joined the aircraft carrier HMS Theseus as second-in-command and executive officer, then after promotion to captain became commanding officer of the Admiralty Underwater Weapons Establishment in Portland, Dorset in 1954.

Early in 1956, Hunt was appointed commanding officer of the Bay-class frigate HMS Bigbury Bay. After the ship's arrival in Bermuda later the same year, he received the temporary promotion to commodore and the title Senior Naval Officer, West Indies (SNOWI), remaining in that appointment until 1958. When HMS Bigbury Bay returned to the UK in June 1957 Hunt assumed command of HMS Ulster, remaining in command until June 1958. On return to the United Kingdom, he became chief staff officer to the Flag Officer Submarines. His final three years, from 1960 to 1963, were served as director of naval equipment in Bath, Somerset.

== Post-Royal Navy career ==
After retiring from the Royal Navy, Hunt emigrated to Australia, settling in Queensland, where he joined the diplomatic service in Brisbane and became a member of the British High Commission, retiring in 1976 at the age of 60.

== Notes and sources ==
Notes

Sources

- "Captain George Hunt". The Daily Telegraph. London. 21 August 2011.
- "Captain George Hunt". The Times. 23 August 2011.
- "No. 35029". The London Gazette (Supplement). 31 December 1940. pp. 27–28. Mention in Despatches
- "No. 35613". The London Gazette (Supplement). 26 June 1942. p. 2865. Distinguished Service Cross
- "No. 36367". The London Gazette. 4 February 1944. p. 688. Bar to Distinguished Service Cross
- "No. 36505". The London Gazette (Supplement). 5 May 1944. p. 2127. Mention in Despatches
- "No. 36687". The London Gazette (Supplement). 1 September 1944. p. 4125. Distinguished Service Order
- "No. 36825". The London Gazette (Supplement). 1 December 1944. p. 5571. Bar to Distinguished Service Order
- "No. 37650". The London Gazette. 12 July 1946. p. 3628. Promotion substantive Lieutenant Commander
- "No. 40075". The London Gazette. 15 January 1954. p. 378. Promotion to Captain
