= Oh Boy (The Paradise Motel album) =

Studio album by The Paradise Motel
- Released: 2 September 2013
- Recorded: Headgap Studios, Melbourne, Australia
- Genre: Rock, acoustic, indie, noir
- Length: 45:04
- Label: independent
- Producer: Casey Rice, The Paradise Motel

The Paradise Motel chronology
I Still Hear Your Voice at Night (2011)	Oh Boy (2013)

Oh Boy is an album released by the Australian band The Paradise Motel in September 2013. This was their first independently released album, and the first to predominantly feature songwriter Charles Bickford as vocalist. Many of the songs concern masculinity and Australian culture.

The song 'The Spider' was released digitally as a single. Despite no touring and no promotion, the album received positive reviews

== Track listing ==
Oh Boy
No.	Title	Length
1.	"City of Fortune"	4:09
2.	"East of Early Losses"	4:50
3.	"The Spider"	7:08
4.	"Walk Don't Walk"	3:45
5.	"Zane Grey"	3:10
6.	"King of the Past"	5:29
7.	"Rivers of Tinsel"	4:45
8.	"The Swedish Prize"	5:45
9.	"He Was Alive"	6:04

== Personnel ==
- Merida Sussex – vocals
- Charles Bickford – vocals, guitar, keyboards
- Matt Aulich – guitars, arrangements
- Esme Macdonald – bass guitar
- Mark BJ Austin – keyboards, organ, pedal steel
- Andy Hazel – drums
- Campbell Shaw – violins
