= HMS Ultor =

Submarine of the Royal Navy

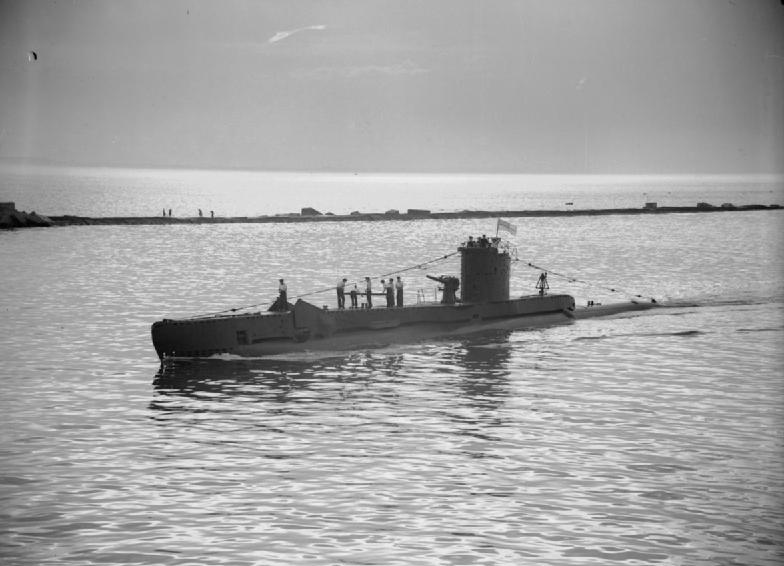
- HMS Ultor

History

United Kingdom
- Name: HMS Ultor
- Builder: Vickers-Armstrongs, Barrow-in-Furness
- Laid down: 30 December 1941
- Launched: 12 October 1942
- Commissioned: 31 December 1942
- Fate: Scrapped on 22 January 1946
- Badge

General characteristics
- Class & type: U-class submarine
- Displacement: Surfaced - 540 tons standard, 630 tons full load; Submerged - 730 tons
- Length: 58.22 m (191 ft)
- Beam: 4.90 m (16 ft 1 in)
- Draught: 4.62 m (15 ft 2 in)
- Propulsion: 2 shaft diesel-electric; 2 Paxman Ricardo diesel generators + electric motors; 615 / 825 hp
- Speed: 11.25 knots (20.8 km/h) max surfaced; 10 knots (19 km/h) max submerged
- Complement: 27-31
- Armament: 4 bow internal 21 inch (533 mm) torpedo tubes - 8 - 10 torpedoes; 1 - 3-inch (76 mm) gun

HMS Ultor (P53) was a Royal Navy U-class submarine built by Vickers-Armstrongs at Barrow-in-Furness, launched in 1942, and part of the third group of the class. So far she has been the only ship of the Royal Navy to bear the name Ultor.

== Career ==
During the Second World War, Ultor operated in the Mediterranean Sea, where she sank the French ship Penerf, the Italian auxiliary minesweeper No.92/Tullio, the Italian merchant Valfiorita, the Italian torpedo boat Lince, the German merchant Aversa (the former Greek Kakoulima), the German sailing vessel Paule, the German guardvessel FCi 01, the German patrol vessel SG-11 (the former French Alice Robert), the German tug Cebre, the German tankers Felix 1 and Tempo 3 (the former Greek Pallas), the German auxiliary patrol vessel Vinotra III and the German auxiliary submarine chaser UJ 2211/Hardy. Ultor also sank nine sailing vessels in the Mediterranean.

Ultor also unsuccessfully attacked the German-controlled French merchant Condé and the former Danish, German merchant Nicoline Maersk, the German auxiliary minelayer Niedersachsen and the German netlayer NT 38. She also damaged a French fishing vessel and torpedoed and damaged the German (former French) tanker Champagne. The damaged tanker was beached and later torpedoed again by HMS Uproar.

By 19 October 1943, when Aversa was sunk, Ultor had fired 68 torpedoes of which 32 were hits (47%), the highest proportion of hits made by any submarine commander up to that time. At this time she was under the command of George Hunt.

Ultor survived the war and returned to the shore establishment HMS Dolphin at Gosport, and after a brief refit joined the 6th Flotilla at Blyth. When Blyth was closed Ultor went around to Rothesay, with the depot ship HMS Cyclops. She spent some time as an ASDIC training target, then was put into reserve at Londonderry. She was finally broken up at Briton Ferry, in January 1946.
