= I Still Hear Your Voice at Night =

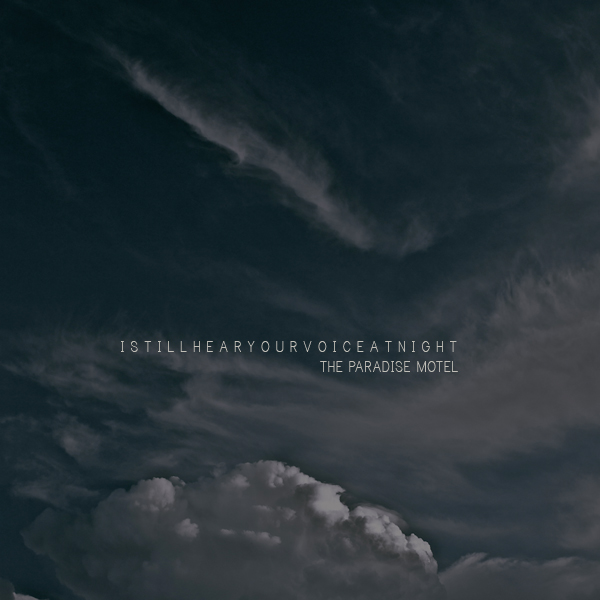

Studio album by The Paradise Motel
- Released: 29 January 2011
- Genre: Acoustic, orchestral
- Length: 51:28
- Label: Inertia Records
- Producer: The Paradise Motel

The Paradise Motel chronology
Australian Ghost Story (2010)	I Still Hear Your Voice at Night (2011)	Oh Boy (2013)

Professional ratings
Review scores
Source	Rating
Mess+Noise	(positive)
Rave Magazine	4/5 stars
The Sydney Morning Herald	4/5 stars
YourGigs	(positive)

I Still Hear Your Voice at Night is an album by the Australian band The Paradise Motel. It was originally recorded in Australia and London in 2008 but shelved due to the death of drummer Damien Hill in December of that year. Following this, the band focused on recording, releasing and touring the album Australian Ghost Story during 2009 and 2010, holding the release of I Still Hear Your Voice at Night to early 2011.

It was released on 29 January 2011, the date Hill's daughter Esther was born in 2009 shortly after his death, via the band's website with a physical release following in late March. It received largely positive reviews.

== Themes ==
This album continues the band's interest in disappearances and landscape. The band describe it:

Before we recorded 2010's Australian Ghost Story, we made this, our first of three releases scheduled for 2011. Taking its title from a John Cale song, "Close Watch," it was recorded over 12 months, in 4 studios, in 3 different countries. Spanning 3 births, a death and the loss and discovery of at least two friends, I Still Hear Your Voice at Night is an examination of tightly compressed grief and joy.

The evidence of a bond that survived a ten-year separation, ISHY VAN renders its themes through tales of hometown flooding, outback murder, unsolved disappearances, buried grudges, shooting accidents, husbands that drank their wives into solitude, a sailor who was loved and a sailor who destroyed all that he found.

== Track listing ==
No.	Title	Length
1.	"The Promise"	4:08
2.	"The Legend of Sailor"	6:07
3.	"Joseph's Head"	6:09
4.	"Bear Never Left Her Home"	5:58
5.	"The Moonlight and the Scrub"	4:21
6.	"Dead Leaves"	4:42
7.	"Memory of Leonski"	5:48
8.	"The Exiles"	4:58
9.	"A New Hat for Mr Black"	6:03
10.	"ISHY VAN"	3:19

== Personnel ==
- Mérida Sussex - vocals
- Esme Macdonald - bass
- Matt Aulich - guitars
- Campbell Shaw - violins
- BJ Austin - organ, pedal steel
- Damien Hill - drums
- Charles Bickford - guitar, organ, percussion
