= Australian Ghost Story =

Studio album by The Paradise Motel
- Released: 11 June 2010
- Recorded: Warburton, Victoria and Fitzroy, Victoria; January 2010–April 2010
- Genres: Acoustic, Orchestral
- Length: 43:16
- Label: Inertia Records
- Producer: The Paradise Motel

The Paradise Motel chronology
Reworkings (1999)	Australian Ghost Story (2010)	I Still Hear Your Voice at Night (2011)

Professional ratings
Review scores
Source	Rating
Beat Magazine	(positive)
Crikey News	(positive)
FasterLouder	(positive)
The Mercury	(positive)
Mess+Noise	(positive)
The Vine	(positive)

Australian Ghost Story is an album by Australian group The Paradise Motel. It was released in June 2010 on Left Over Life to Kill and Inertia Records to positive reviews.

== Track listing ==
No.	Title	Length
1.	"The Witnesses"	3:47
2.	"Brown Snake"	4:35
3.	"My Sister in 94"	5:01
4.	"A Bend in the Terror"	4:01
5.	"The Cops"	4:00
6.	"Goodwin and the Jumpsuit"	4:27
7.	"Familiar Stranger"	3:47
8.	"Stations of the Cross"	3:45
9.	"Prelude to a Saga"	9:56

== Personnel ==
- Merida Sussex – vocals
- Matt Aulich – guitars, arrangements
- Esme Macdonald – bass guitar
- Mark BJ Austin – keyboards, organ, pedal steel
- Andy Hazel – drums
- Campbell Shaw – violins
- Charles Bickford – various

== Themes ==
The album was released to coincide with what would have been the 30th birthday of Azaria Chamberlain, and was cited in national press as an insightful and respectful companion-piece to the resurgence in media interest in the case. Chief songwriter Charles Bickford stated "We wanted to write a record about a contemporary event that was unique to Australia and part of our shared experience. A lot of artists explore things like convicts eating each other, but to me that's the ancient past."
