= Still Life (The Paradise Motel album) =

Studio album by The Paradise Motel
- Released: 28 August 1996
- Recorded: Melbourne, Victoria
- Genre: Acoustic, Orchestral
- Length: 48:16
- Label: Infectious Records, Mushroom Records
- Producer: The Paradise Motel

The Paradise Motel chronology
Left Over Life to Kill (1996)	Still Life (1996)	Flight Paths (1998)

Still Life is an album by Tasmanian rock band The Paradise Motel. It was released to largely positive reviews in 1996.

Later copies of the album were accompanied by the bonus CD Junk Mail, a half-hour instrumental soundscape.

== Themes ==
This album began the band's interest in disappearances and landscape. Two singles were taken from the album, 'Bad Light' and 'Calling You'. It is still regarded as one of the band's most popular albums, and live sets still feature many songs from it. The album followed on from the EP Left Over Life To Kill released several months earlier, and is considered their debut.

== Track listing ==
Still Life
No.	Title	Length
1.	"Bad Light"	5:17
2.	"California"	3:09
3.	"Circles"	4:25
4.	"Calling You"	4:34
5.	"Dead Skin"	5:31
6.	"Men Who Loved Her (Grew Sadder)"	6:42
7.	"Historical"	4:43
8.	"John"	3:28
9.	"F Heart"	4:01
10.	"Stones"	6:33

== Personnel ==
- Mérida Sussex - vocals
- Matt Bailey - bass
- Matt Aulich - guitars
- BJ Austin - organ, pedal steel
- Tim O'Shannassy - drums
- Charles Bickford - guitar, organ, percussion

Lyrics were written by Charles Bickford, string arrangements were composed by Matt Aulich.
