= Rupert Shephard =

English painter (1909-1992)

- Born: 12 February 1909; Islington, London, England
- Died: 16 March 1992 (aged 83); London, England
- Education: Slade School of Fine Art
- Known for: Painting, drawing
- Spouse: Nicolette Macnamara (m. 1965; died 1987)
- Relatives: Caitlin Thomas (sister-in-law)

Rupert Norman Shephard (12 February 1909 – 16 March 1992) was an English painter, illustrator and art teacher.

== Early life ==
Shephard was born in Islington, the son of an engineer and a charity worker, who were both Quakers and keen amateur artists. He attended Repton School, before studying at the Slade School of Fine Art from 1926 to 1929. After graduating from the Slade, Shephard taught at Raynes Park County School whilst painting at night and often in pubs and music halls. In 1929, he began to exhibit with the London Group at both the Wertheim Gallery and the Coolings Gallery. Throughout 1937 to 1939 Shephard exhibited with the founding members of the Euston Road School, William Coldstream, Claude Rogers and Victor Pasmore at the Storran Gallery whilst continuing to exhibit with the London Group. Shephard held his first solo exhibition at the Calman Gallery in 1939.

== World War II ==
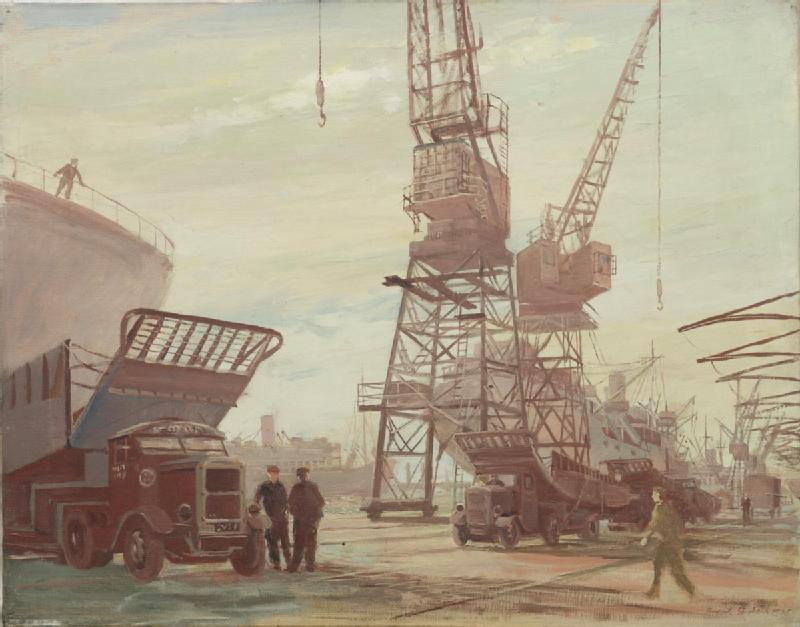
Lorries Transporting Landing Craft, Royal Albert Docks, London (1945) (Art.IWM ART LD 5293)

From 1940 to 1943, Shephard worked as an industrial draughtsman but continued to paint and submitted several paintings, on industrial production topics, to the War Artists' Advisory Committee, WAAC. These included a series of five pictures, Women in Industry and a scene inside an aircraft repair workshop. In the spring of 1945, WAAC offered Shephard a full-time contract with the Ministry of War Transport, which he completed with a number of scenes painted in London.

== Later life ==
From 1946 to 1948 Shephard taught at the Central School of Arts and Crafts in London. In 1942, Shephard had married his first wife, the daughter of a British businessman based in South Africa and in 1948 the couple moved to Cape Town with their children. Shephard spent fifteen years in South Africa as the director of the Michaelis Art School at the University of Cape Town. He had ten solo exhibitions in South Africa and also exhibited internationally. In 1962 his wife died and Shephard and his three children returned to Britain. In 1965 Shephard married the artist Nicolette Macnamara whose sister, Caitlin, was the widow of Dylan Thomas. Shephard knew Nicolette from when they were both students at the Slade together and had previously painted portraits of Thomas and both sisters. In 1972 Shephard was elected to Royal Society of Portrait Painters. Shephard continued to paint portraits and exhibition pieces but failing eyesight ended his career in 1990 and two years later he died of cancer in London.

Collections holding works by Rupert Shephard include the Imperial War Museum, the RAF Museum, the National Portrait Gallery, and the British Museum. Shephard's painting Portrait of Mrs Marie Lydia Grant was burned by demonstrators during the Rhodes Must Fall protests at the University of Cape Town, UCT, in February 2016. One other painting, Portrait of JP Duminy, was removed from UCT in 2016.

== Bibliography ==
- 1954 Capescapes (verse illustrated with lino-cuts),
- 1966 Passing Scenes: Eighteen Images of Southern Africa (Stourton Press, London)
- 1977 Cockcrow and other Verses
- 1977 Reissue of Passing Scenes: Eighteen Images of Southern Africa
