= Flight Paths =

Studio album by The Paradise Motel
- Released: 4 June 1998
- Studio: Sing Sing Studios, Seneca Studios and Big Sur, Melbourne, Victoria
- Genre: Acoustic, orchestral
- Length: 50:03
- Label: Infectious; Mushroom
- Producer: Victor Van Vugt

The Paradise Motel chronology
Still Life (1996)	Flight Paths (1998)	Reworkings (1998)

Professional ratings
Review scores
Source	Rating
Allmusic	4/5 stars
Juice	(favourable)
Rolling Stone	(favourable)

Flight Paths is the second album by Australian rock band The Paradise Motel, their first album released after relocating from Melbourne to London.

Singles from the album included "Aeroplanes", "Derwent River Star" and "Drive", a cover of the Cars' hit, and the band's most popular song. Their version was featured on the soundtrack to the 2001 Richard Lowenstein film He Died with a Felafel in His Hand.

Flight Paths was followed by the album Reworkings featuring remixes of tracks from Flight Paths and the band's previous album Still Life by artists including Lee Ranaldo, Echoboy and Mark Eitzel.

== Track listing ==
Flight Paths track listing
No.	Title	Length
1.	"Aeroplanes"	4:53
2.	"Heavy Weather"	4:04
3.	"Derwent River Star"	3:02
4.	"Other Things"	2:54
5.	"Four Degrees"	3:14
6.	"Dead Beats"	4:43
7.	"Daniel"	6:48
8.	"Drive"	4:29
9.	"Cities"	4:59
10.	"Caravans"	2:56
11.	"Hollywood Landmines"	4:11
12.	"Find Nineteen"	3:57

== Personnel ==
- Mérida Sussex – vocals
- Matt Bailey – bass
- Matt Aulich – guitars
- BJ Austin – organ, pedal steel
- Tim O'Shannassy – drums
- Charles Bickford – guitar, organ, percussion

Lyrics were written by Charles Bickford, string arrangements were composed by Matt Aulich, except 'Drive', written by Ric Ocasek.

== Charts ==
Chart performance for Flight Paths
Chart (1998)	Peak position
Australian Albums (ARIA)	83
