= Reworkings =

Remix album by The Paradise Motel
- Released: 27 September 1999
- Genre: Electronic, Rock, Orchestral
- Length: 37:03
- Label: Infectious Records, Mushroom Records
- Producer: Victor Van Vugt

The Paradise Motel chronology
Flight Paths (1998)	Reworkings (1999)	Australian Ghost Story (2008)

Reworkings is an album by the Australian rock band The Paradise Motel. It is made up of remixes of previously released songs remixed by other acts. A remix of the song "The Trees" by Lee Ranaldo entitled "Lee's Trees" was released as a single.

The album was also issued as an accompanying CD to later copies of the previous album Flight Paths.

This was the last album released by the band before splitting up the following year. The album 'The Winter of Our Discothèque' was recorded later in 1999 but remains unreleased.

== Track listing ==
Reworkings
No.	Title	Length
1.	""Lee's Trees" (Lee Ranaldo remix)"	4:07
2.	""Drive" (Mogwai remix)"	4:04
3.	""Hollywood Landmines" (Juniper remix) by Leo Wyndham"	3:55
4.	""Cities" (Mark Eitzel remix) by Mark Eitzel and Bruce Kaphan"	4:28
5.	""Four Degrees" (Trout remix) by Hefner"	3:14
6.	""Derwent River Star" (Echoboy remix) by Echoboy"	4:43
7.	""BH Rock" (Bows remix) by Bows"	6:48
