= Nicolette Macnamara =

English author and artist (1911-1987)

- Born: 1 February 1911; London, England
- Died: 10 May 1987 (aged 76); London, England
- Education: Slade School of Fine Art
- Occupations: Artist and author
- Spouses: Anthony Devas (m. 1931; died 1958) Rupert Shephard (m. 1965)
- Relatives: Caitlin Thomas (sister)
- Writing career
- Genres: Fiction and biographical
- Notable work: Two Flamboyant Fathers (1966)

Nicolette Macnamara (later Devas then Shephard, 1 February 1911 – 10 May 1987), was an English artist and author who was active in the work of PEN International.

== Biography ==
Macnamara was the eldest of the four children born to Francis Macnamara (1884–1946), an eccentric Irish poet and sometime landowner, and his wife Mary Yvonne Majolier (1886–1973), who was from a family with both Anglo-Irish and French roots. In 1916 Francis Macnamara left his family to follow various political and cultural adventures, including an attempt to establish a 'Republic of Macnamaraland'. His family were left impoverished and they had to move home several times. They stayed in France with the Majolier family for a time and in 1923 they settled at Blashford in the New Forest. Blashford was close to Fryern Court, the large property in Fordingbridge where Augustus John, Dorelia McNeill and an extended group of their friends and family were living the bohemian life. The Macnamara children moved freely between the two households and although Nicolette received little formal education, and did not learn to read until she was twelve, she did gain both an appreciation of art, from the artists at Freyn Court, and also a love of nature, particularly ornithology, from exploring the New Forest. Her only formal education were brief stints at schools in Cannes and Paris, where she had some formal art classes.

Augustus John used his influence, and money, to enable Macnamara to enter the Slade School of Fine Art when she was sixteen. Her fellow students included William Coldstream, Rodrigo Moynihan and Anthony Devas, whom she married in 1931. Macnamara did well at the Slade and throughout the 1930s began establishing her career as an artist with works shown at the New English Art Club, the Royal Academy and the London Group. Shortly before the beginning of World War Two she had a one-woman show at the Storran Gallery. After the war Macnamara decided to concentrate on writing fiction. Her first novel, Bonfire was recommended for publication by Cecil Day Lewis and when it was eventually published, in 1958, it sold well and received good reviews including one by John Betjeman in the Daily Telegraph. Her most successful book was her autobiographical account of her unorthodox childhood, Two Flamboyant Fathers, which focused on both Augustus John and her own father. For several years Macnamara worked studying and sorting birds' eggs at the Natural History Museum.

Anthony Devas died in 1958 and several years later Macnamara married Rupert Shephard, an artist and contemporary of hers from the Slade who was also a widower with three children. The couple set up home in Chelsea in a house which quickly became a social hub for many artists. Macnamara became an active member of both English PEN and PEN International and was a regular speaker at their events and conferences. In 1987 Macnamara's artwork featured in an exhibition of works by former Slade students held at Sally Hunter Fine Art. Macnamara's younger sister, Caitlin, married the poet Dylan Thomas.

== Published works ==
- Bonfire (1958)
- Nightwatch (1961)
- Two Flamboyant Fathers (1966)
- Black Eggs (1970)
- Susanna's Nightingales (1978)
- Pegeen Crybaby (1986)
