= The Paradise Motel =

Australian band

- Origin: Hobart, Tasmania, Australia
- Genres: Rock, noir, experimental, acoustic, orchestral
- Years active: 1994–2000, 2008–present
- Labels: Mushroom; Infectious; Stolen; Left Over Life to Kill
- Members: Matthew Aulich; Charles Bickford; Mark "BJ" Austin; Mérida Sussex; Andy Hazel; Esme MacDonald; Campbell Shaw
- Past members: Matt Bailey; Tim O'Shannassy; Damien Hill

The Paradise Motel are an independent Australian rock band that formed in Hobart, Tasmania. In 1994, they relocated to Melbourne and issued two albums on Mushroom Records, Still Life (1996) and Flight Paths (1998). After relocating to the United Kingdom, they released a third, Reworkings (1999), before disbanding in early 2000. The group reformed in January 2008 and released the albums, Australian Ghost Story (2010), I Still Hear Your Voice at Night (2011) and Oh Boy (2013).

== History ==
=== 1994–1998: Formation and early releases ===
The Paradise Motel were formed in Hobart, Tasmania with Matt Aulich on electric guitar, Matt Bailey on bass guitar and Charles Bickford on acoustic guitar. After playing one concert at Kaos Cafe they relocated to Melbourne in 1995. Mérida Sussex, who worked in the St Kilda Public Library, joined on lead vocals. Their line-up was completed by Mark "BJ" Austin on Hammond organ and Tim O'Shannassy on drums. O'Shannassy had replaced a "succession of other percussionists [who] had passed through" the band.

Their first Melbourne concert was on Valentine's Day 1995 at the Carlton Movie House, beginning a penchant for performing at atypical venues. They joined Bruce Milne's management company, The Shining Path, and signed to Mushroom Records which, in 1996, released their début six-track extended play, Left Over Life to Kill, via the label's offshoot, Infectious Records.

The band have managed to polarise critical opinions as to the worth of its dramatic, haunting, minor key soundscapes. Some declared The Paradise Motel to be the most interesting new band of 1996, others found them insufferably pretentious and solemn.

— Ian McFarlane, Encyclopedia of Australian Rock and Pop (1999),

Left Over Life to Kill was variously described as "An assured and extremely vivid piece of music", "In 25 minutes they might very well change the way you listen to music, 9.5/10", and "Possibly the finest début EP by a band in Australian music history". McFarlane felt it "contained a number of melancholy pieces" typified by "German Girl", "Ashes" and "North of God". Left Over Life to Kill reached No. 2 on the Australian Alternative Charts, and became one of the highest selling alternative releases of 1996. A second EP, Some Deaths Take Forever, followed – titled from graffito seen at the Brisbane venue, The Zoo. This EP has remixes of two tracks and out-takes from Left Over Life to Kill, and a cover version of The Triffids' song "Raining Pleasure"; it was produced by the band. 2,000 hand-numbered copies were pressed and soon sold out. The cover art on these EPs and some subsequent releases maintained a stylistic uniformity, reminiscent of Penguin Books' Penguin Classics series. In September 1996 the group toured nationally supporting Tex Perkins.

Early in 1997 The Paradise Motel issued their first full-length album, Still Life. Early editions featured an accompanying bonus disc, Junk Mail, which consisted of 32-minutes of out-takes. Ahead of the album, in October 1996, they released a single, "Bad Light". It was described as "a perfect example of the band's self-described technique: 'The violence and the silence'". In February 1998 they issued a single, "Heavy Weather", with an attendant film clip. Both highlighted a new lush styling for the band as Mushroom and Infectious Records prepared them for an overseas market. "Calling You" was promoted in the United Kingdom as a CD single. In June they followed with another single, "Derwent River Star", for the Australian market. In January 1998, they supported the band Stereolab, on their Australian tour. In March, they toured the UK supporting indie rock band Grandaddy and Sparklehorse in July.

=== 1998–2000: Move to London and disbandment ===
In September 1998, The Paradise Motel relocated to the UK and issued their second album, Flight Paths. It indicated a denser production, other singles and a UK tour followed. UK magazine, Melody Maker had described them as "a deliciously unsettling proposition". Mushroom and Infectious Records had the group as their first signing to the London-based branch. After touring Europe they followed with a North American tour supporting Mercury Rev, including at the College Music Journal Festival in New York and the North by Northwest Festival. In March 1999 the band released a cover version of The Cars' 1984 track, "Drive". In October they followed with Reworkings, a compilation of remixes by guests including Mogwai, Mark Eitzel and Echoboy. The remix by Lee Ranaldo, "Lee's Trees" was released as a single. The group continued to play shows in the UK with acts such as The Divine Comedy, Smog and Drugstore, though they released no new material and disbanded in early 2000.

=== 2000–2008: Intervening years ===
Following the disbandment of The Paradise Motel, Aulich, Sussex, Austin and O'Shannassy remained in the UK. Aulich joined indie band, Drugstore before returning to Australia where he formed an alternative country band, Small Sips, with Bailey and Karl Smith of Sodastream. In 2009, Smith and Bailey formed the Melbourne-based band Lee Memorial. Sussex released a solo album before forming Candy with guitarist and producer Paul Jones. In 2003 Sussex co-founded the Stolen Recordings label with Jones and Rachael Robb.

Austin furthered his studies in architecture and married Gina Morris (ex-NME journalist and ex-member of Stereolab). O'Shannassy completed a Doctorate of Philosophy in music and literature in London, and then taught at a number of colleges in New York. Bickford lived in Melbourne for 12 months, before returning to London where he married publicist and journalist Lauren Zoric in 2004. He joined the London band, Paloma & The Penetrators, playing keyboard behind lead singer Paloma Faith. In 2005 he developed and appeared as the resident expert and co-host on a weekly prime time ITV program, The Golden Lot, co-hosted with Carol Vorderman. Bickford and Zoric returned to Melbourne in 2007.

=== 2008–present: Reunification ===
In January 2008 The Paradise Motel had reformed with Aulich, Austin, Bickford and Sussex joined by new members Damien Hill on drums and ex-Penthouse bassist Esme MacDonald. They began recording their third studio album, I Still Hear Your Voice at Night however the album was not released until 29 January 2011 due to the suicide of Hill in December. Thematically it was considered an extension of their earlier preoccupations; death, disappearances and the Australian wilderness. After the recording Campbell Shaw joined on violin.

Work on a fourth studio record, Australian Ghost Story began mid-2009, with the addition of drummer Andy Hazel (ex-Tacoma Radar, School of Emotional Engineering and The Ruby Suns). The album concerns the Azaria Chamberlain disappearance and was issued on the 30th anniversary of her birth, 11 June 2010. The album received positive reviews upon its release.

The following album Oh Boy was released in September 2013. It was announced as the second album in a thematic trilogy examining Australian self-criticism and drive for cultural approbation.

== Musical style ==
The Paradise Motel's instrumentation typically features two guitars (acoustic and electric), bass, drums, Hammond organ, pedal steel, and occasional accompaniment from a string quartet. The group was considered to be "sonically adventurous" with their frequent deconstruction and reinterpretation of their own songs. Their aesthetic was one of sparseness and melancholia, punctuated by bursts of manic loudness; or, as they once said in an interview, "the violence and the silence". Their lyrical subjects and vocal style often veered towards the melancholy and macabre. Much of the Paradise Motel's songwriting came from Bickford, whilst Aulich was responsible for most string and instrumental arrangements.

== Discography ==
=== Albums ===
List of albums, with selected details and chart positions
| Title | Album details | Peak chart positions |
| Title | Album details | AUS |
|---|---|---|
| Still Life | Released: 1996; Label: Infectious (DINF007); Format: CD | — |
| Left Over Life to Kill | Released: 1997; Label: Infectious (INFECT47CD); Format: CD | — |
| Flight Paths | Released: 1998; Label: Infectious (DINF017); Format: CD | 83 |
| Australian Ghost Story | Released: June 2010; Label: Left Over Life to Kill (LOLTK001); Formats: CD, digital | — |
| I Still Hear Your Voice at Night | Released: January 2011; Label: Left Over Life to Kill (LOLTK05); Formats: CD, digital | — |
| Oh Boy | Released: 2013; Label: Left Over Life to Kill (LOLTK06); Formats: CD, digital | — |

=== EPs ===
List of EPs
| Title | details |
|---|---|
| Left Over Life to Kill | Released: 1996; Label: Infectious (DINF001); Formats: CD, LP |
| Some Deaths Take Forever | Released: 1996; Label: Infectious (DINF004); Format: CD |
| Bad Light | Released: 1996; Label: Infectious (DINF006); Format: CD |
| Please Keep Me Safe | Released: 1997; Label: Infectious (DINF009); Format: CD |
| Reworkings | Released: September 1999; Label: Infectious (INFECT 65CDPX); Format: CD |

=== Other appearances ===
- Three tracks were used on the Australian TV show, Heartbreak High in 1997 (Season 5): "Ashes" (on "Episode 92"), "German Girl" ("Episode 93") and "Bad Light" ("Episode 103").
- The Paradise Motel's songs "German Girl" and cover of The Cars' "Drive" appears in the soundtrack to the film, He Died with a Felafel in His Hand.
- Songs by the band have appeared on several compilation CDs attached to magazines such as NME, Melody Maker and Select.

== Awards and nominations ==
=== ARIA Music Awards ===
The ARIA Music Awards is an annual awards ceremony that recognises excellence, innovation, and achievement across all genres of Australian music. They commenced in 1987.

| Year | Nominee / work | Award | Result | Ref. |
|---|---|---|---|---|
| 1998 | Flight Paths | Best Adult Alternative Album | Nominated | |
