= Caitlin Thomas =

English author (1913–1994)

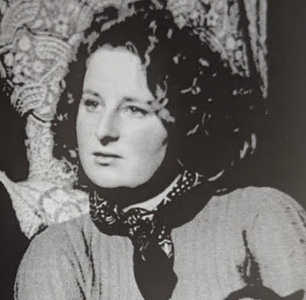
- Caitlin Macnamara in 1936
- Born: Caitlin Macnamara; 8 December 1913; Hammersmith, London, England
- Died: 31 July 1994 (aged 80); Catania, Sicily
- Occupation: Author
- Spouse: Dylan Thomas (m. 1937; died 1953)
- Partner: Giuseppe Fazio (1957–1994; her death)
- Children: 4, including Aeronwy Thomas
- Relatives: Nicolette Macnamara (sister)
- Writing career
- Genre: Biographical

Caitlin Thomas (/ˈkeɪtlɪn/; née Macnamara; 8 December 1913 – 31 July 1994) was an Anglo-Irish author and the wife of the poet and writer Dylan Thomas. Their marriage was a stormy affair, fueled by alcohol and infidelity, though the couple remained together until Dylan's death in 1953. After his death, she wrote the book Leftover Life to Kill, an account of her self-exile to Italy. She paints a portrait of a grieving widow seeking solace in distance, a younger lover, and alcohol.

== Early history ==
Caitlin Macnamara was born in Hammersmith, London, to Francis Macnamara and Yvonne Majolier. The couple had a son and three daughters, of whom Caitlin was the youngest. Her eldest sister Nicolette became an artist and author. The Macnamaras were descended from a family of Anglo-Irish landlords, and her grandfather, Henry Vee Macnamara, was the squire of two estates in County Clare.

Caitlin's maternal grandfather, Edouard Majolier, was a French Quaker corn merchant in London, whilst her grandmother, Susannah Cooper, was the daughter of an Anglo-Irish landlord, and a sister-in-law to Alfred Perceval Graves and an aunt to Joseph Maunsel Hone and Philip Graves. Anton Dolin was another, more distant, relation.

Caitlin's father, a would-be poet, moved in literary circles and was friendly with a number of artists. When Caitlin was about four or five, her father began to live apart from his family. Caitlin's mother left London, and she and the girls settled in Blashford, near Ringwood and the New Forest, where they were close friends to Welsh artist Augustus John and his family. In her early teens, Caitlin fell in love with Augustus's son, Caspar John, who was almost eleven years her senior. During this period she was raped by Augustus, who seemed to believe that sex with those he painted was an artist's privilege.

In 1930, at the age of 16, Caitlin returned to London and entered a dancing school, and at age 18 was a member of a London chorus line. She had also spent parts of her childhood with her grandmother, Susannah, in the Majolier house in Congénies in the south of France. She later lived for a brief time in Paris before moving to County Clare in 1934, when her father returned to the Macnamaras' reduced estates.

== Life with Dylan Thomas ==
Caitlin Macnamara was introduced to Dylan Thomas in the Wheatsheaf pub in Fitzrovia, London, in 1936 by Augustus John. She and Dylan bonded immediately, and that summer he travelled to Laugharne in Wales where Caitlin and John were staying at Castle House where Richard Hughes lived. Dylan arrived with a friend, Fred Janes, and after the four travelled to Fishguard to view a painting exhibition, Dylan became drunk and jealous and started an argument with John. John punched Dylan and drove back to Laugharne with Macnamara. By the end of 1936, Caitlin and Dylan Thomas had begun a relationship through correspondence. By 21 April 1937, the couple were together in London, and, on 11 July 1937, they were married in Penzance, Cornwall.

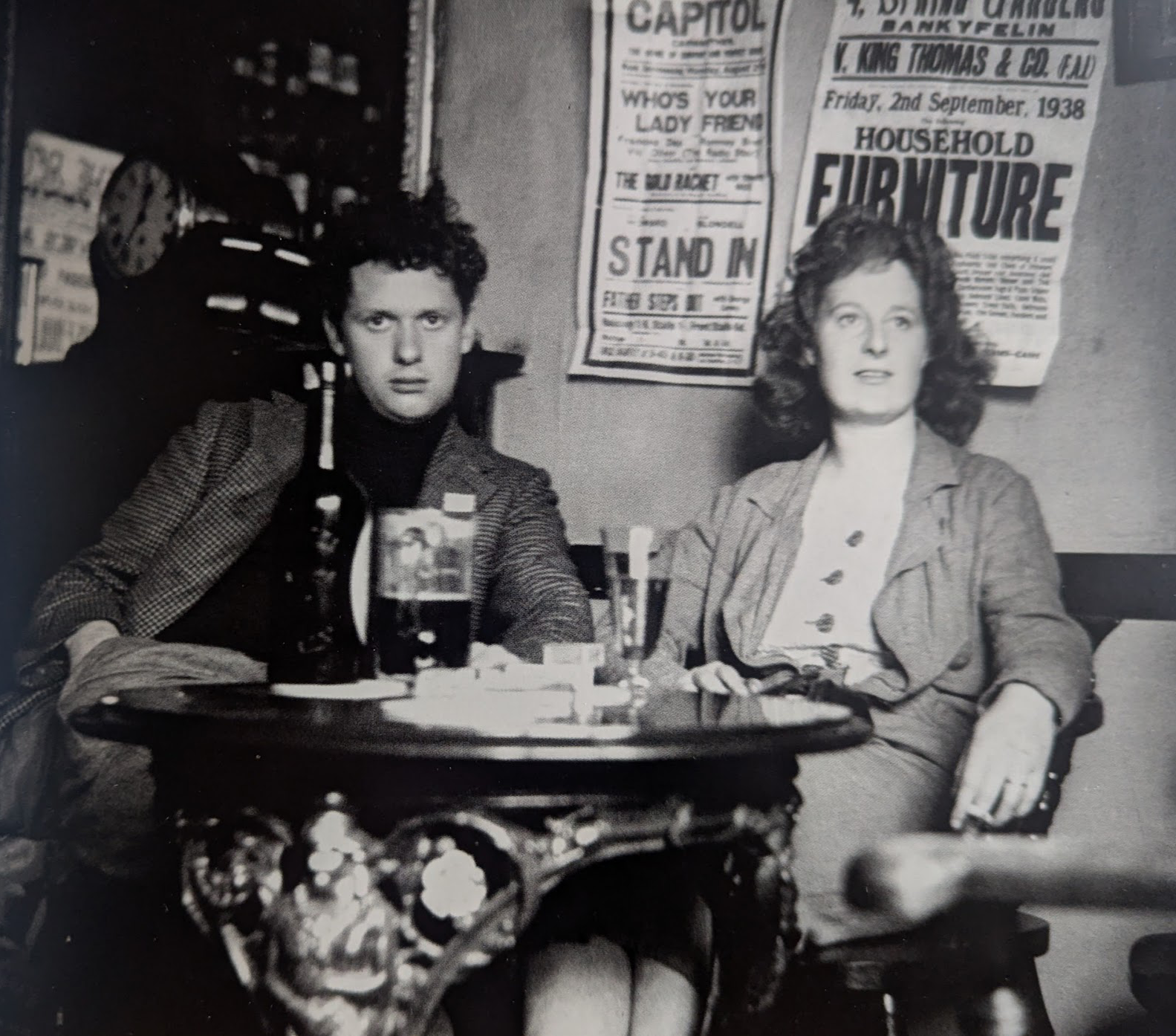
Dylan and Caitlin at Brown's Hotel, Laugharne in 1938. Taken by their Blashford friend, the photographer and artist Nora Summers.

After a period in Blashford, Hampshire with Caitlin's mother, they eventually settled in a rented cottage in Gosport Street, Laugharne, in the spring of 1938, before moving into 'Sea View' a couple of months later. They left 'Sea View' in July 1940 and then led a peripatetic lifestyle; over the next few years, they lived in Hampshire (again), Wiltshire, Chelsea, Bishopton, Talsarn, New Quay, Blaencwm (Llansteffan), Oxford and Italy, before returning from Italy to South Leigh in Oxfordshire in September 1947. In May 1949, the Thomases moved into The Boat House, which had come on the market for £3000, and was purchased by Margaret Taylor, one of Dylan's benefactors, and wife of the historian A. J. P. Taylor.

Caitlin Thomas had three children by Dylan, Llewelyn Edouard (1939–2000), Aeronwy Thomas-Ellis (1943–2009) and Colm Garan Hart (1949–2012).

Although Dylan tried to portray himself as a bohemian character, it was Caitlin who was the true rebel. Vera Philips, a childhood friend of Dylan from Swansea, recalled "Dylan had the proper Welsh background, ... He was brought up like me, worrying "What will the neighbours think?" Whereas Caitlin didn't care a bugger what anyone thought."

Their marriage was a notoriously stormy affair, fueled by alcohol and infidelity. Caitlin once famously described their relationship as "raw, red bleeding meat". Despite their fiery marriage, she jealously protected both Dylan and his reputation, and tried to protect him from others and himself. Although Caitlin was known for her belligerent personality, admitting publicly that she instigated most of the fights and inflicted the most damage, some writers have shown sympathy for a woman who was at the receiving end of Dylan's sometimes foul-mouthed abuse and pouting silences. She became more and more resentful of her role as a stay-at-home mother, compounded by the run-down nature of their home, the Boat House, which had neither electricity nor running water.

The relationship between the couple deteriorated further when in 1950, Dylan undertook the first of his tours of America. The trips were arranged as a lucrative venture to gain capital to fund Dylan's poetry writing while back in Britain, though by the time of his return, the money he had accumulated did little more than repay outstanding debts. Furthermore, Caitlin had become more and more frustrated at being left behind, dealing with the children and the bills, while her husband spent his time carousing in another country.

In October 1953, Dylan travelled to New York without her, to give further readings of Under Milk Wood. On 5 November, he collapsed with breathing difficulties and was admitted to hospital. Caitlin travelled to America to be with her husband, though her reaction on arriving at his death bed was aggressive, reportedly shouting "Is the bloody man dead yet?". In her autobiography, Caitlin: Life with Dylan Thomas, she states that she had no recollection of using the words, but she was, by her own words, "stinkin' drunk" by the time she arrived. Other reports state that when Caitlin found another woman tending to her comatose husband, she flew into a fit of rage, biting an attendant and fighting with bystanders until she was subdued. She was subsequently committed to the River Crest Sanitarium in the city.

In 1957, Caitlin published a frank account of her later life and reflections on her life with Dylan, titled Leftover Life to Kill, though she refused to collaborate with most of her husband's biographers in later years. In a memoir published in 1982, she described her relationship with Dylan as "Predominantly a drink story because without the first-aid of drink it could never have got on to its rocking feet." In 1986, Caitlin published her autobiography Caitlin: Life with Dylan Thomas. Although their relationship was tempestuous, her writings in a personal journal uncovered over fifty years after Dylan's death showed her passion and love for her husband.

== Later life ==
After Dylan's death in 1953, Caitlin returned to Laugharne, but she was desperate to leave the village, referring to it as a "permanently festering wound". She spent less and less time in Wales, and made several journeys to Ireland and Italy. She spent an increasing amount of time in Italy, staying on Procida, until, in 1957, she decided to relocate to the country. She left Britain with her children in September 1957, and moved to Rome with a Welsh actor and writer, Cliff Gordon. Gordon was gay, and his main purpose in Rome appears to have been as a drinking partner for Caitlin. Towards the end of 1957, while eating at a restaurant on Via Margutta she met Giuseppe Fazio, a Sicilian 'director's assistant'. The couple began a relationship soon after, which lasted until her death. Although they never married, they had a son together, Francesco, who was born on 29 March 1963 when Caitlin was 49. In 1963, while in Italy, she wrote her second book, Not Quite Posthumous Letters to My Daughter.

By her own account, after the death of Dylan she experienced severe emotional and psychological distress, and was treated in clinics and asylums in London, Rome and Catania. She began to attend Alcoholics Anonymous in 1973, aged 60. In 1982, she and Fazio left Rome and moved to Catania, Sicily, eventually moving into a house left by Fazio's mother.

Caitlin Thomas died in Catania on 31 July 1994 following a long illness, aged 80. She was buried next to Dylan in Laugharne, though the burial request came as a surprise to her family, with her daughter believing that she would have preferred to have been buried in Italy after spending so much of her later life there.

== In popular culture ==
=== Drama and film ===
- In 1964, Kate Reid was nominated for a Tony Award for her performance as Caitlin in the play Dylan.
- In a 2008 film, The Edge of Love, Caitlin was played by Sienna Miller, in a story that reflects the relationship between Caitlin, Dylan and Vera Philips, Dylan's childhood friend and distant cousin.
- Caitlin Thomas is played by Kelly Reilly in the 2014 film chronicling her husband's first tour of the US, Set Fire to the Stars. A second movie, Caitlin, with Miranda Richardson and Rosamund Pike depicting the title character at different points in her life, was to be produced the same year, but failed to reach the screen.
- In the 2014 UK television drama A Poet in New York, Caitlin is portrayed by Essie Davis.
- Romola Garai portrayed her in the 2016 film Dominion opposite Rhys Ifans as Dylan Thomas.

=== Popular music ===
- The Australian rock band The Paradise Motel named their 1997 debut album after the title of Caitlin's autobiography.
- American folksinger Joe Crookston wrote a song about Caitlin's relationship with Dylan, entitled Caitlin at the Window, which was released on his 2011 album Darkling and the BlueBird Jubilee.
- The 2018 album by Manic Street Preachers titled Resistance Is Futile features a track about the marriage of Dylan and Caitlin Thomas, written from a first person perspective, titled "Dylan & Caitlin".

== Bibliography ==
- Devas, Nicolette (1966) Two Flamboyant Fathers, Collins
- Devas, Nicolette (1978) Susannah's Nightingales, Collins
- Ferris, Paul (1993). Caitlin: The Life of Caitlin Thomas. London: Pimlico. ISBN 0-7126-6290-1.
- Ferris, Paul (1989). Dylan Thomas: A Biography. New York: Paragon House. ISBN 1-55778-215-6.
- Lycett, Andrew (2004). Dylan Thomas: A New Life. Phoenix. ISBN 978-0-7538-1787-2.
- Thomas, Aeronwy (2009) My Father’s Places, Constable
- Thomas, Caitlin (1957) Leftover Life to Kill, Putnam
- Thomas, Caitlin (1963) Not Quite Posthumous Letter to My Daughter, Putnam
- Thomas, Caitlin; George Tremlett (1986). Caitlin: Life with Dylan Thomas. London: Secker & Warburg. ISBN 0-436-51850-3.
- Thomas, Caitlin (1997) Double Drink Story: My Life with Dylan Thomas, Virago
- Thomas, D. N. (2008). Fatal Neglect: Who Killed Dylan Thomas?. Seren. ISBN 978-1-85411-480-8.
- Thomas, D. N. (2013) Dylan Thomas and the Edge of Love: the Real Story in Cambria – also online at Cambria
