= Richard Williams (theatre director) =

English theatre director

Richard Williams is an English theatre director, producer and teacher working mainly in the areas of dramatic and lyric presentation. Richard Williams' career has concerned classics, new plays, music theatre and opera productions. In a directing career lasting some 35 years he has directed more than 250 productions.

He has been Artistic Director of four theatre companies: Contact Theatre, Manchester, where he was awarded Best Director Award two years running, The Oxford Stage Company, Unicorn (Arts) Theatre, London (1990–1997) and Liverpool Playhouse (1996–1998). His varied opera work includes seventeen years as director of opera at the Dartington International Music Festival as well as a flourishing freelance career.

He was given Barclays Regional Theatre Award and The Liverpool Echo Award in recognition of his work at Liverpool Playhouse.

He directed the Glyn Robbins adaptations of The Lion, the Witch and the Wardrobe (at the Westminster Theatre, 1984) and Winnie the Pooh (Mermaid Theatre, 1988), and Graeme Garden's musical The Pocket Orchestra (Trafalgar Studios 2, 2006). He wrote the stage adaptation of Clive King's Stig of the Dump for the Tabard Theatre, Chiswick, production of 2008-09. He directed some components of the Deloitte Ignite Festival at the Royal Opera House in 2010.

His association with composer Stephen McNeff goes back to about 1978, when Williams directed Aucassin et Nicolette with McNeff's music for the latter's South-West Music Theatre; during McNeff's residency at the Banff Centre in Canada Williams directed a production of Brecht's The Threepenny Opera there in 1981. Williams's work as librettist includes texts for McNeff's community opera adaptation of Tarka the Otter (2007) and his opera-oratorio The Chalk Legend (2012).

His opera work includes Henry Purcell's Dido and Aeneas at the Garden Opera Company, King Arthur at Trinity College, Cambridge, and Médée and Pygmalion at the Dartington Festival. He has also directed twentieth century operas, including Benjamin Britten's The Turn of the Screw. In June 2012 he and the pianist Joanna MacGregor revived and reworked their chamber adaptation of Mozart's The Magic Flute (first presented at the Unicorn Theatre) for the Bath International Music Festival, of which Professor MacGregor was then Artistic Director.

He is currently (2020) Course Leader of the BA Acting at Drama Centre London, and remains associated with Dartington. Williams' recent work includes directing the British premiere of Vivaldi’s opera L'Olimpiade at the Bath International Music Festival, also presented at the Eilat Festival. His work with Nova Music Opera under George Vass includes stage direction of several contemporary operas, including Stephen McNeff's Prometheus Drown'd (2014, to Williams's libretto), Charlotte Bray and Amy Rosenthal's Entanglement (2015), and Joseph Phibbs and Laurie Slade's Juliana (2018).

== Publication ==
- Directing for the Stage, Crowood Theatre Companions (Crowood Press, 2018)
