= Ruth Ellis =

British escort and convicted murderer (1926–1955)

- Born: Ruth Neilson; 9 October 1926; Rhyl, Denbighshire, Wales
- Died: 13 July 1955 (aged 28); HMP Holloway, London, England
- Cause of death: Execution by hanging
- Resting place: HMP Holloway; later reburied in St Mary's Church, Old Amersham, Buckinghamshire, England, UK; 51°40′04.9″N 0°36′53.2″W
- Occupation: Nightclub hostess
- Known for: Last woman executed in the United Kingdom
- Spouse: George Johnston Ellis (m. 1950)
- Children: 2
- Status: Executed
- Conviction: Murder
- Penalty: Death by hanging (Note: Posthumously commuted to life imprisonment in 2026)

Ruth Ellis (née Neilson; 9 October 1926 – 13 July 1955) was a Welsh nightclub hostess and convicted murderer who became the last woman to be executed in the United Kingdom, following the fatal shooting of her abusive lover, David Blakely.

Ellis was abused by her father from the age of 11 and entered the world of nightclub hostessing as a teenager, leading to a chaotic life marked by unstable relationships with men. One of these men was Blakely, a racing driver engaged to another woman. On Easter Sunday, 10 April 1955, Ellis shot Blakely dead outside The Magdala public house in Hampstead, London. She was immediately arrested by an off-duty policeman. At her trial in June 1955, Ellis was found guilty of premeditated murder and sentenced to death; on 13 July she was hanged at Holloway Prison. In 2026, Ellis was posthumously conditionally pardoned, commuting her sentence from execution to life imprisonment.

== Early life ==
Ellis was born Ruth Neilson on 9 October 1926 in Rhyl, Denbighshire, Wales, the fifth of six children. During her childhood, she moved with her family to Basingstoke, Hampshire. Her mother, Elisaberta (Bertha) Goethals, was a Belgian war refugee, and her father, Arthur Hornby, was a cellist from Manchester who played on Atlantic liners. The Register of Marriages records Arthur marrying Bertha at Chorlton-cum-Hardy in 1920. Arthur later changed his surname to Neilson.

Arthur's twin brother, Charles, was killed in 1928, when Ellis was two years old. Arthur began to be physically and sexually abusive to his elder daughter, Muriel. Although Bertha was aware of the abuse, she took no action. Muriel later stated that this was because Arthur treated her mother so badly that Bertha was afraid to speak out. As a result of the abuse, 14-year-old Muriel conceived a child by her father. Arthur was questioned by the police but released. Bertha then passed as the child's mother. Arthur began targeting Ellis when she turned 11. Muriel often tried to protect her, sending Ellis out of the house when she sensed trouble. The sisters never openly discussed their father's abuse.

Ellis briefly attended Fairfields Senior Girls' School in Basingstoke until 1940, after which she attended Worting village school before leaving education at the age of 14. Her first job was as an usherette at a cinema in Reading. Arthur moved to London shortly afterwards, taking a live-in post as caretaker-chauffeur for Porn & Dunwoody Ltd., a lift manufacturer. In 1941, Ellis befriended Edna Turvey, the girlfriend of her older brother Julian, who was on leave from the Royal Navy. Edna introduced Ellis to what Muriel later called "the fast life." Ellis and Edna eventually moved to London and lived with Arthur. His abuse of Ellis continued while he also conducted an affair with Edna. The affair ended when Bertha discovered the pair in bed during an unannounced visit. Bertha subsequently moved to London.

In 1944, at the age of 17, Ellis became pregnant by Clare Andrea McCallum, a married Canadian soldier. She was sent to a nursing hospital in Gilsland, Cumberland, where she gave birth to her son, Clare Andrea (Andy) Neilson, on 15 September. McCallum stopped sending money about a year later. Andy, who later lived with Bertha, was supported by Ellis through her work in various factory and clerical jobs.

== Personal life and career ==
By the end of the 1940s, Ellis had become a nightclub hostess in Soho through nude-modelling work, which paid significantly more than her earlier jobs. Morris Conley, her manager at the Court Club in Duke Street, blackmailed his hostess employees into sleeping with him. By early 1950, Ellis was making money as a full-service escort and became pregnant by one of her regular clients.

On 8 November 1950, Ellis married George Johnston Ellis, a 41-year-old divorced dentist with two sons, at the register office in Tonbridge, Kent. A regular customer at the Court Club, George was a violent and possessive alcoholic who became convinced that his wife was having an affair. Ellis left him several times but always returned. When she gave birth to a daughter, Georgina, in 1951, George refused to acknowledge paternity; they separated shortly afterwards and later divorced.

In 1951, while four months pregnant, Ellis appeared uncredited as a beauty queen in the Rank film Lady Godiva Rides Again. She returned to prostitution after her divorce from George and moved back into her parents' home with her daughter.

In 1953, Ellis became the manager of the Little Club, a nightclub in Knightsbridge. At this time, she was lavished with expensive gifts by admirers. She met David Moffett Drummond Blakely, three years her junior, through racing driver Mike Hawthorn. Blakely was a former public school boy educated at Shrewsbury School and Sandhurst, and a hard-drinking racing driver. Within weeks, he moved into Ellis's flat above the club despite being engaged to another woman, Mary Dawson. Ellis became pregnant for a fourth time but had her second abortion, feeling unable to reciprocate the level of commitment Blakely showed towards their relationship.

Ellis then began seeing Desmond Cussen (1923–1991), a former Royal Air Force pilot who had flown Lancaster bombers during the Second World War and later took up accountancy. He was appointed a director of the family business Cussen & Co., a wholesale and retail tobacconist with outlets in London and South Wales. Ellis eventually moved in with Cussen at 20 Goodwood Court, Devonshire Street, north of Oxford Street. The relationship with Blakely continued, however, and became increasingly violent as both continued to see other partners. Blakely offered to marry Ellis; she agreed, but in January 1955 she suffered a miscarriage after he punched her in the stomach during an argument.

== Murder ==
On Easter Sunday, 10 April 1955, Ellis took a taxi from Cussen's home to a second-floor flat at 29 Tanza Road, Hampstead, the home of Anthony and Carole Findlater, where she suspected Blakely might be. As she arrived, Blakely's car drove off, so she paid the taxi and walked the 1/4 mile (400 m) to The Magdala public house in South Hill Park, where she found his car parked outside.

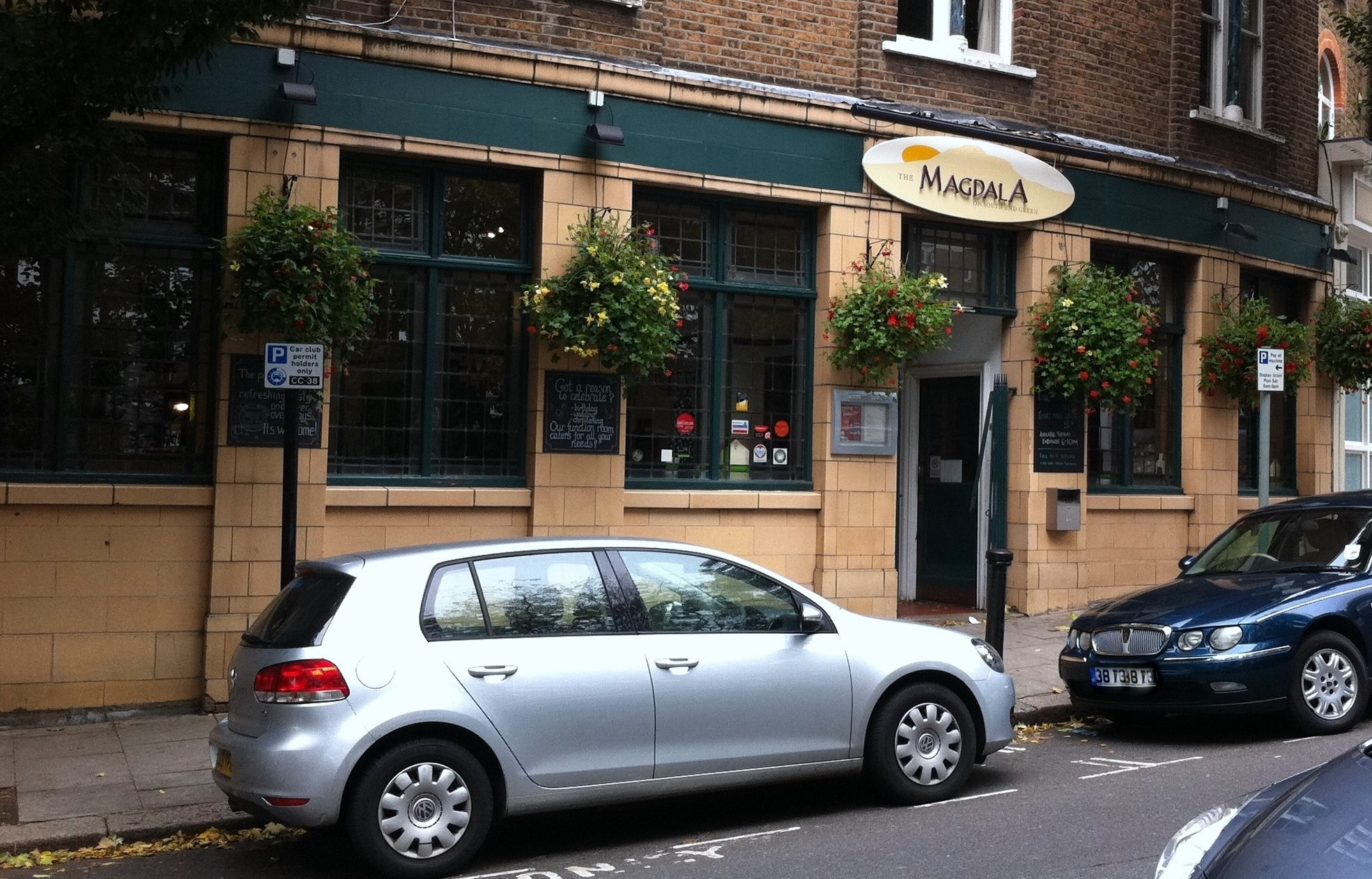
The Magdala pub in 2008. Two "bullet holes" in the wall at lower left were drilled by the pub's landlady in the 1990s.

At around 9:30 pm, Blakely and his friend Clive Gunnell emerged. Blakely passed Ellis, who was waiting on the pavement, when she stepped out of the doorway of Henshaw's, a newsagent next to The Magdala. As Blakely searched for the keys to his car, Ellis took a .38 calibre Smith & Wesson Victory Model revolver from her handbag and fired five shots at him. The first shot missed. She pursued Blakely as he ran around the car, firing a second shot that caused him to collapse onto the pavement. She then stood over him and fired three more bullets, one discharged less than half an inch from his back, leaving powder burns on his skin.

Ellis was seen to stand over Blakely as she repeatedly attempted to fire the revolver's sixth shot, finally discharging it into the ground. This bullet ricocheted off the road and injured a bystander, Gladys Yule, who lost the use of her right thumb.

== Trial ==
Ellis, apparently in shock, asked Gunnell, "Will you call the police, Clive?" She was arrested immediately by an off-duty policeman, who heard her say, "I am guilty, I'm a little confused." Blakely's body was taken to hospital with multiple fatal wounds to the intestines, liver, lung, aorta and trachea. Originally taken in as evidence, the revolver is now in the Metropolitan Police's Crime Museum.

At Hampstead police station, Ellis appeared calm and not obviously under the influence of drink or other drugs. She made her first appearance at a magistrates' court the next day, 16 April, and was ordered to be held on remand. Ellis was twice examined by the principal Medical Officer, M. R. Penry Williams, who found no evidence of mental illness; an electroencephalograph examination on 3 May also found no abnormality. While on remand, she was examined by psychiatrist Duncan Whittaker for the defence and by Alexander Dalzell on behalf of the Home Office. Neither found evidence of insanity.

On 20 June 1955, Ellis appeared in the Number One Court at the Old Bailey, London, before Mr Justice Havers. She wore a black suit and white silk blouse, with freshly bleached and coiffured blonde hair. Her defending counsel, Aubrey Melford Stevenson, supported by Sebag Shaw and Peter Rawlinson, expressed concern about her appearance (and dyed blonde hair) but she did not alter it to appear less striking.

The only question put to Ellis by prosecutor Christmas Humphreys was, "When you fired the revolver at close range into the body of David Blakely, what did you intend to do?" She replied, "It's obvious when I shot him I intended to kill him." This answer guaranteed a guilty verdict and the mandatory death sentence. The jury took 20 minutes to convict her.

== Reprieve decision ==
Ellis remained at Holloway Prison while awaiting execution. She told her mother that she did not want a petition to reprieve her from the death sentence and took no part in the campaign. However, at her relatives' urging, her solicitor, John Bickford, wrote a seven-page letter to Home Secretary Gwilym Lloyd George setting out the grounds for reprieve. Lloyd George denied the request. Ellis dismissed Bickford (who had been chosen by Cussen) and asked to see Leon Simmons, the clerk to solicitor Victor Mishcon, whose firm had previously represented her in her divorce proceedings. Before visiting her, Simmons and Mishcon saw Bickford, who urged them to ask Ellis where she had obtained the gun.

On 12 July 1955, the day before her execution, Mishcon and Simmons visited Ellis, who wished to make her will. When they pressed her for the full story, Ellis asked them to promise not to use what she said to seek a reprieve; Mishcon refused. Ellis then disclosed that Cussen had given her the gun and taught her how to use it on the weekend before the murder. She also said that Cussen had driven her to the scene. After a two-hour interview, Mishcon and Simmons went to the Home Office; the Permanent Secretary, Sir Frank Newsam, was summoned back to London and instructed the head of Criminal Investigation Department (CID) to check the account. Lloyd George later said that the police were able to make considerable enquiries but that it made no difference to his decision. He believed the information made Ellis's guilt greater, showing the murder was premeditated. He also said that the injury to the bystander was decisive: "We cannot have people shooting off firearms in the street! As long as I was Home Secretary I was determined to ensure that people could use the streets without fear of a bullet."

In a final letter to Blakely's parents from her prison cell, Ellis wrote, "I have always loved your son, and I shall die still loving him."

== Execution ==
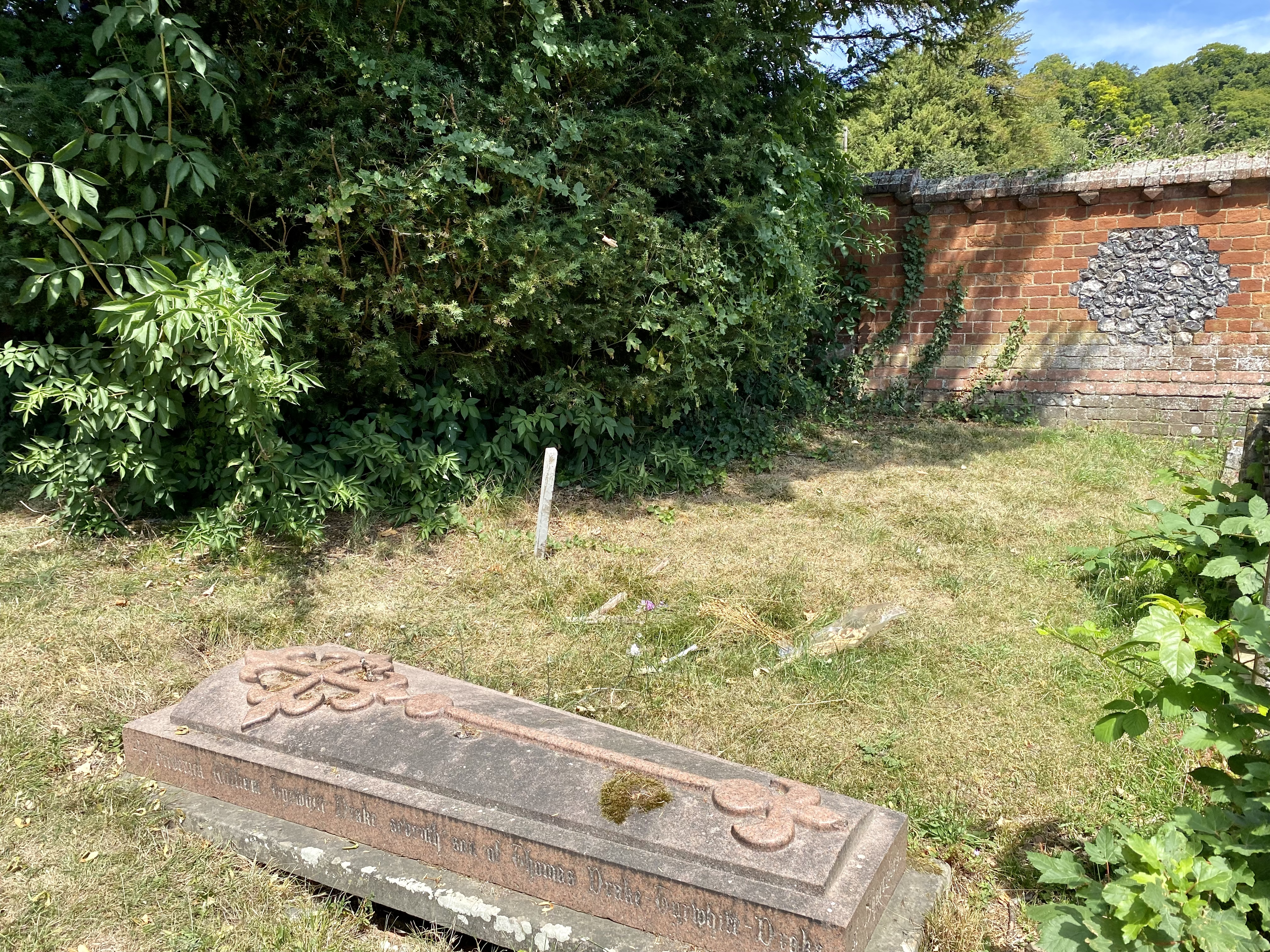
The site of Ellis's grave (marked by a small post) in St Mary's Church, Amersham, in July 2022

The Bishop of Stepney, Joost de Blank, visited Ellis prior to her execution. Just before 9:00 am on 13 July, the hangman Albert Pierrepoint and his assistant entered her cell and took her to the adjacent execution room, where she was hanged. There was a momentary delay caused by a hoax call to the prison. The caller claimed to be the private secretary to Lloyd George and said there had been a stay of execution. Prison governor Charity Taylor spent six minutes telephoning the Home Office to confirm it as a hoax. As a result, Ellis was executed at 9:01 am instead of the planned 9 am. Like the murder weapon, the noose is now in the Metropolitan Police Crime Museum. As was customary in British executions, Ellis was buried in an unmarked grave within the walls of Holloway Prison.

In the early 1970s, the remains of executed women at Holloway were exhumed for reburial elsewhere. In Ellis's case, directed by her son and next of kin, Andy, her remains were reburied in the churchyard of St Mary's Church in Amersham, Buckinghamshire, some 3 mi (4.8 km) from where Blakely was buried. Her headstone was inscribed, "Ruth Hornby 1926–1955."

== Public reaction and legacy ==
Ellis's case caused widespread controversy, attracting exceptionally intense press and public interest to the point that it was discussed by the Cabinet. She was the last woman to be executed in Britain. Then-Prime Minister Anthony Eden made no reference to the case in his memoirs, nor is there any mention in his papers. He accepted that the decision was the Home Secretary's responsibility, though there are indications that he was troubled by it. A petition to the Home Office asking for clemency was signed by 50,000 people but was rejected.

On the day of Ellis's execution, the Daily Mirror columnist Cassandra criticised the sentence, writing: "The one thing that brings stature and dignity to mankind and raises us above the beasts will have been denied her – pity and the hope of ultimate redemption". The British Pathé newsreel reporting the execution openly questioned whether capital punishment – of a woman or of anyone – had a place in the 20th century. The novelist Raymond Chandler, then living in Britain, wrote a scathing letter to the Evening Standard referring to what he called "the medieval savagery of the law".

The execution helped strengthen support for the abolition of the death penalty, which was halted in practice for murder in Britain 10 years later (the last execution in the UK took place in 1964). Reprieve was by then commonplace: between 1926 and 1954, 677 men and 60 women had been sentenced to death in England and Wales, but only 375 men and seven women had been executed. In the early 1970s, Bickford told the Metropolitan Police that Cussen had said, in 1955, that Ellis lied at the trial when she denied he had given her the murder weapon. A police investigation followed, but no further action was taken.

=== Family aftermath ===
Ellis's former husband, George, died by suicide by hanging at a Jersey hotel on 2 August 1958. In 1969, Ellis's mother, Bertha, was found unconscious in a gas-filled room in her flat in Hemel Hempstead; she never fully recovered and did not speak coherently again.

Ellis's son Andy, aged 10 at the time of her execution, took his own life in a bedsit in 1982, shortly after desecrating her grave.

The trial judge, Sir Cecil Havers, had sent money annually for Andy's upkeep, and Christmas Humphreys, the prosecution counsel at Ellis's trial, paid for his funeral. Her daughter Georgina, aged 3 when her mother was executed, was fostered after her father's death three years later. She appeared on the television discussion programmes After Dark and Barrymore in the 1990s, and died of cancer in 2001 at age 50.

=== Pardon campaign ===
In 2003, Ellis's case was referred back to the Court of Appeal by the Criminal Cases Review Commission (CCRC). The Court firmly rejected the appeal, noting that it could rule only on the conviction based on the law as it stood in 1955, not on whether she should have been executed. The Court was critical of having been obliged to consider the appeal:

We would wish to make one further observation. We have to question whether this exercise of considering an appeal so long after the event when Mrs Ellis herself had consciously and deliberately chosen not to appeal at the time is a sensible use of the limited resources of the Court of Appeal. In any view, Mrs Ellis had committed a serious criminal offence. This case is, therefore, quite different from a case like Hanratty [2002] 2 Cr App R 30 where the issue was whether a wholly innocent person had been convicted of murder. A wrong on that scale, if it had occurred, might even today be a matter of general public concern, but in this case, there was no question that Mrs Ellis was other than the killer and the only issue was the precise crime of which she was guilty. If we had not been obliged to consider her case we would perhaps in the time available have dealt with 8 to 12 other cases, the majority of which would have involved people who were said to be wrongly in custody.

In July 2007, a petition was published on the 10 Downing Street website asking Prime Minister Gordon Brown to reconsider the Ellis case and grant her a pardon in light of new evidence that the jury at her trial was not asked to consider. It expired on 4 July 2008.

On 8 July 2026, Deputy Prime Minister and Secretary of State for Justice David Lammy announced that Charles III had granted Ellis a conditional pardon, commuting her sentence from execution to life imprisonment. The pardon was welcomed by Ellis's family, with her granddaughter saying that "justice [had] finally been done"; in contrast, the decision was criticised by Theodore Dalrymple on the grounds that Ellis's actions were clearly premeditated and that, in his view, Blakely's history of abuse towards her did not provide sufficiently extenuating circumstances.

== In popular culture ==
=== Television ===
In 1980, the third episode of the first series of the ITV drama series Lady Killers recreated the court case, with Ellis played by Georgina Hale. In the series one conclusion of Deadly Women, Ellis was portrayed by Carissa Singleton, with Blakely played by Jimmy Aschner.

In June 2023, ITV announced a standalone adaptation of Ellis' story based on Carol Ann Lee's book A Fine Day for Hanging: The Real Ruth Ellis Story, with Ellis portrayed by Lucy Boynton. The adaptation was originally titled Ruth, but was later retitled A Cruel Love: The Ruth Ellis Story. The four-part series aired from March 2025, also starring Toby Jones as John Bickford, Laurie Davidson as David Blakely, Mark Stanley as Desmond Cussen and Nigel Havers as Sir Cecil Havers (his own grandfather).

In the non-fictional sphere, the case was dramatised in the Murder Maps series of documentaries on the Yesterday Channel on 2 November 2017. It was re-examined the following year by film-maker Gillian Pachter in the BBC Four documentary series The Ruth Ellis Files: A Very British Crime Story. The documentary suggested that Ellis may have suffered domestic abuse by Blakely, and that the gun used may have been supplied by Cussen, who may also have driven the taxi that took Ellis to the Magdala pub. It included a cassette tape of a conversation with Christmas Humphreys, in which Cussen was implicated.

=== Books ===
Carol Ann Lee wrote A Fine Day for Hanging: The Real Ruth Ellis Story.

The hanging of Ellis is referenced in Broken Country by Claire Leslie Hall.

=== Film ===
Diana Dors, who had starred in Lady Godiva Rides Again, in which Ellis had a minor uncredited role, played a character resembling (though not based on) Ellis in the 1956 British film Yield to the Night, directed by J. Lee Thompson.

The only direct cinematic portrayal of Ellis to date has been the 1985 film Dance with a Stranger, directed by Mike Newell and featuring Miranda Richardson as Ellis. The scriptwriter was Shelagh Delaney.

The film Pierrepoint (2006) includes Ellis as a supporting role, portrayed by Mary Stockley. It was broadcast on ITV on 25 August 2008, attracting an estimated audience of 3.6 million. The film was renamed Pierrepoint: The Last Hangman for its North American release.

=== Stage ===
Ellis's and Pierrepoint's stories are retold in the stage play Follow Me, written by Ross Gurney-Randall and Dave Mounfield and directed by Guy Masterson. It premiered at the Assembly Rooms, Edinburgh, as part of the 2007 Edinburgh Festival Fringe. The case also formed the basis for Amanda Whittington's play The Thrill of Love. It premiered at the New Vic Theatre, Newcastle-under-Lyme, in February 2013 and later played at St James Theatre, London, with Faye Castelow in the main role. Maxine Peake played Ellis in an adaptation of Whittington's play, broadcast on 5 November 2016 by BBC Radio 4.

The story also inspired the 2015 opera Entanglement by Charlotte Bray and Sinners Club, a 2017 musical play by Lucy Rivers. A co-production with Theatr Clwyd, the latter premiered at The Other Room Theatre in Cardiff in February 2017.

In 2023, actor Carly Halse wrote and performed Now You See Me, a solo piece based on Ellis's story. It toured as part of the Hidden Stories double-bill presented by The Plays The Thing theatre company.

In March 2025, Ruth - The Musical was produced by Andy Morahan and performed at Wilton's Music Hall. It was described as a "timely tale of a woman’s struggle in a patriarchal society, which resonates so deeply in the era of #MeToo".
