= Prisoner (British TV series) =

British television series

- Genre: Thriller
- Created by: Matt Charman
- Written by: Matt Charman; Haleema Mizra
- Directed by: Otto Bathurst; Pia Strietmann
- Starring: Tahar Rahim; Izuka Hoyle; Leonie Benesch; Finn Bennett; Laurie Davidson; Ken Nwosu; Sam Troughton; Kitty Reed; Daniel Betts; Selorm Adonu; Brían F. O'Byrne; Catherine McCormack; Eddie Marsan
- Country of origin: United Kingdom
- Original language: English
- No. of series: 1
- No. of episodes: 6

Production
- Executive producers: Matt Charman; Foz Allan; Otto Bathurst
- Producer: Barney Reisz
- Running time: 44–50 minutes
- Production companies: Sky Studios; Binocular Productions

Original release
- Network: Sky Atlantic
- Release: 30 April 2026 – present

Prisoner is a British thriller television series created by Matt Charman, directed by Otto Bathurst, and starring Tahar Rahim and Izuka Hoyle. The series premiered on 30 April 2026 on Sky Atlantic. In May 2026, the show was renewed for a second series.

== Premise ==
A prisoner and the prison guard escorting them survive an ambush.

== Cast and characters ==
=== Main ===
- Tahar Rahim as Tibor Stone (series 1), a genius hitman and witness against Dempsey
- Izuka Hoyle as Amber Todd, a prison transport officer for SEF Security Services
- Leonie Benesch as Nina Drâgus, an assassin trained by Stone who is working for Dempsey
- Finn Bennett as Olly Hatton, Amber's husband and the father of her daughter, Mia
- Laurie Davidson as Declan Dempsey (series 1), Dempsey's son
- Ken Nwosu as Phil Hawkins, a supervisor for SEF Security Services
- Sam Troughton as Will O'Neill (series 1), an agent with the National Crime Unit
- Kitty Reed as Jade Butler (series 1), a prison transport officer for SEF Security Services
- Daniel Betts as Marcus Turner, a prison transport officer for SEF Security Services
- Selorm Adonu as Jamal Azumah (series 1), a prison transport officer for SEF Security Services
- Brían F. O'Byrne as Harrison Dempsey (series 1), the leader of organised crime group Pegasus
- Catherine McCormack as Josephine Campbell, the Director of the National Crime Unit
- Eddie Marsan as Alex Tebbit (series 1), the Director of Operations for the National Crime Unit
- Keeley Hawes (series 2)
- Solly McLeod (series 2)
- David Dawson (series 2)
- Elijah Cook (series 2)

=== Supporting ===
- Steven Elder as Joe Sutherland (series 1), a prison transport officer for SEF Security Services
- Jessica Barker-Wren as Nancy Howard, an agent with the National Crime Unit
- Youssef Kerkour as Miles Zahidi (series 1), Dempsey's lieutenant
- Marie Bunel as Carla Dumont (series 1), Stone's estranged mother
- Michele Austin as Kelly Douglas, Amber's mother who is in prison for armed robbery

=== Guest ===
- Lisa Palfrey as Tara Evans (series 1), a criminal associate of Kelly Douglas
- Ace Bhatti as Viraj Mundhra (series 1), the Home Secretary

== Episodes ==
No.	Title	Directed by	Written by	Original release date
1	"Episode 1"	Otto Bathurst	Matt Charman	30 April 2026
Harrison Dempsey, the leader of organised crime group Pegasus, stands trial at the Old Bailey after being arrested by the National Crime Unit. Tibor Stone, a former hitman, agrees to testify against Dempsey in exchange for witness protection and a reduced sentence. On discovering his safehouse in St Davids may be compromised, NCU official Alex Tebbit requisitions a nearby prisoner transport van manned by Amber Todd and her colleague Joe Sutherland to transport Tabor to London overnight with an AFO escort. Tibor, a diabetic, needs to be given insulin regularly. The convoy is attacked in Cardiff by a drone and gunmen led by Nina, hired by Dempsey's son Declan. Joe and the AFO's are killed while Amber handcuffs herself to Tibor and the two escape. Amber treats Tibor's wounds and gives him a Glucagon shot. He explains that Nina is his former protégé. Amber calls the NCU to arrange evacuation, and Tebbit warns her about Tibor. The two appear to be extracted by the NCU, but Tibor realizes Nina is a passenger in the car.
2	"Episode 2"	Otto Bathurst	Matt Charman	7 May 2026
Nina takes Tibor and Amber to a warehouse 3D printing weapons, implying she has a mole in the NCU. Declan, involved with Nina, arrives with Miles, his father's lieutenant, seeking instructions on how to proceed. NCU Director Campbell focuses on finding the mole. NCU agent Will O'Neill warns Amber's husband Olly not to return home with their baby, Mia. Tibor lies to Amber about having a son killed by Pegasus to manipulate her. On a call with Dempsey, Tibor says Declan is the reason they both got caught, and he plans to destroy their lives how Declan destroyed his. Dempsey instructs Nina to kill Amber. Using a teaspoon, Tibor escapes with Amber in Declan's Rolls Royce. Olly and Mia are targeted, but Tibor guides him on how to escape and gives him an address. The NCU discovers the drone weapons are advanced 3D printed alloy. Campbell suspends Tebbit, believing he is the mole, but doesn't have enough to arrest him. Tibor robs a chop shop for cash to get him and Amber to London, and threatens her to comply.
3	"Episode 3"	Otto Bathurst	Haleema Mizra	14 May 2026
Tibor and Amber get Nina arrested by the police, and pay a trucker to drive them to London. O'Neill, now leading the investigation, is shown to be the NCU mole, and redirects focus to Amber. Dempsey forces him to get Nina released. Tebbit links Pegasus associate Ivanov to the polymer in the drone weapons. He warns Amber's colleagues O'Neill plans to set her up. When O'Neill interviews them, they steal his phone and download the contents. Olly and Mia arrive at the address, and are taken in by Carla Dumont, Tibor's mother. On discovering an urn, she tells Olly that she and Tibor killed his violent father. Miles offers the polymer weapons to Russian criminal Mikhail, assuring him the sale will happen when Dempsey is acquitted. However, the impulsive Declan kills Miles and assumes control of the deal. The trucker gives Tibor and Amber up to Declan for more money, but they lock him in the back and escape. Nina frees him, and suggests they set up their own enterprise after the Mikhail deal and killing Stone.
4	"Episode 4"	Pia Strietmann	Matt Charman	21 May 2026
When Tibor goes into hypoglycemic shock, Amber steals a car and drives them to Carla's house, reuniting with Olly and Mia. Carla revives Tibor (addressing him by his real name, Étienne) and Olly cuts the handcuffs with boltcutters. Concerned by Tibor and Carla's behaviour, Olly urges Amber to leave. However, Amber still wants to get Tibor to court, knowing their pursuers won't stop otherwise. Desperate, Olly calls O'Neill and gives him the postcode, which he passes to Declan instead of the NCU. Amber, Tibor and Carla probe each other psychologically about their personalities and traumatic backgrounds, including Amber's mother being in prison and Carla encouraging Tibor to kill people from a young age. Nina and her men attack the property, but Carla and Tibor kill several and Amber injures one with a nail gun. Carla is shot in the stomach by Nina, and asks Tibor to euthanise her, which is witnessed by Amber. Nina confronts Olly and incapacitates him, taking Mia and driving away as Amber pursues on foot.
5	"Episode 5"	Pia Strietmann	Haleema Mizra and Matt Charman	28 May 2026
After dropping Olly at hospital, Tibor offers to exchange himself for Mia. Amber calls her colleagues and Tebbit, who prioritises getting Tibor to court over recovering Mia. He also believes Pegasus are assisting a coordinated terror attack in six countries dubbed the "Day of Action" by selling the weapons. Tebbit gives Campbell a Usb drive with proof of O'Neill's treachery and the upcoming attack, but she hands him to Pegasus who kill him, making it look like suicide. Tibor and Amber force O'Neill to arrange the handover and get her mother Kelly temporarily released from prison. Kelly connects them with her criminal associates to rescue her Mia and extract Tibor. The exchange takes place at an ice hockey rink owned by Kelly's friend, but Nina's team bypasses security with the polymer weapons. O'Neill is killed rescuing Mia from Nina, and Kelly prepares to take Mia to Olly. Amber fights Nina, who gets away, and helps Tibor escape. However, she is arrested by armed police after picking up Tibor's gun.
6	"Episode 6"	Pia Strietmann	Matt Charman	4 June 2026
Amber gets Campbell to release her so she can get Stone to court before the trial concludes. Knowing her Pegasus affiliation, Amber disposes of a tracker Campbell placed on her, and she and her colleagues Marcus and Jade use three identical prison vans to avoid Nina and get Tibor to court. Her colleagues Jamal and Phil give NCU agent Nancy Howard, a friend of Tebbit, the intel on the "Day of Action" and warn her of Campbell's affiliation. In a surprise move, Tibor denies knowing Dempsey on the stand, resulting in his acquittal. Dempsey completes the weapons sale. Howard forces Campbell to tell Home Secretary Viraj Mundhra, about the weapons deal. Campbell claims she kept it secret due to the trial sensitivity. Mundhra believes her, but the pressure forces her to seize the UK gun shipment against Dempsey's orders. Nina and Declan secretly re-route the EU shipment. Tibor escapes custody and directs Amber to Dempsey's mansion, claiming they would both still be unsafe if he was in prison. She doesn't object when he kills Mikhail, Declan and Dempsey. Amber and Tibor part ways. However, Nina gets the drop on Tibor and kills him, wanting revenge for the death of Declan. Whilst driving to reunite with Olly and Mia, Amber appears to remember that Nina is still at large.

== Production ==
The series is written by Matt Charman, who also serves as showrunner. The series is produced by Binocular Productions and received a series order from Sky Television in October 2024. Haleema Mizra is deputy showrunner and writer. The series is directed by Otto Bathurst, with later episodes directed by Pia Strietmann. Executive producers are Charman, Foz Allan, Bathurst, and Adrian Sturges for Sky Studios. Barney Reisz is the series producer.

In February 2025, Tahar Rahim and Izuka Hoyle were announced to lead the cast with Eddie Marsan, Catherine McCormack, Leonie Benesch, Finn Bennett, Sam Troughton, Laurie Davidson, Ken Nwosu, Brían F. O'Byrne, and Youssef Kerkour in supporting roles.

Filming took place in Wales in 2025, with filming locations including Cardiff. Aspects of funding for the series came from the Welsh government.

On May 14, 2026, Sky renewed the show for a second series. In November 2026, Keeley Hawes, Solly McLeod, David Dawson, and Elijah Cook joined the cast.

== Broadcast ==
The six-episode first series premiered on 30 April 2026 on Sky Atlantic.
