= The Girlfriend (TV series) =

British television series

- Promotional poster
- Genre: Psychological thriller
- Created by: Naomi Sheldon; Gabbie Asher
- Based on: The Girlfriend by Michelle Frances
- Starring: Robin Wright; Olivia Cooke; Laurie Davidson; Waleed Zuaiter; Tanya Moodie; Shalom Brune-Franklin; Leo Suter; Naomi Sheldon; Karen Henthorn; Francesca Corney; Ben Miles; Marina Bye; Anna Chancellor
- Music by: Ruth Barrett
- Countries of origin: United Kingdom; United States
- Original language: English
- No. of series: 1
- No. of episodes: 6

Production
- Executive producers: Robin Wright; Will Tennant; Phil Robertson; Caroline Norris; Michelle Frances; Gabbie Asher; Dave Clarke; John Zois; María Cabello; Jonathan Cavendish
- Producers: Jonathan Cavendish; Caroline Norris
- Cinematography: Mattias Nyberg; Paul Morris
- Editors: Mark Davis; Mags Arnold; Marc Richardson; Alex Mackie
- Running time: 45–52 minutes
- Production companies: The Imaginarium; Amazon MGM Studios

Original release
- Network: Amazon Prime Video
- Release: 10 September 2025

The Girlfriend is a psychological thriller television miniseries for Amazon Prime Video, directed by Robin Wright and Andrea Harkin. Based on Michelle Frances' novel, the miniseries stars Wright, Olivia Cooke, and Laurie Davidson. It premiered on 10 September 2025.

On 11 June 2026, it was announced that a follow-up miniseries The Boyfriend was currently in development.

== Premise ==
The miniseries explores themes of love, obsession, greed, and power depicting a mother, Laura's reaction to her son, Daniel's new girlfriend, Cherry and her perceived motivations.

== Cast and characters ==
=== Main ===
- Robin Wright as Laura Sanderson, Daniel's mother
- Olivia Cooke as Cherry Laine, Daniel's new girlfriend
- Laurie Davidson as Daniel "Danny" Sanderson

=== Recurring ===
- Waleed Zuaiter as Howard Sanderson, Laura's husband and Daniel's father
- Tanya Moodie as Isabella Russell-Bailey, Laura's best friend and Brigitte's mother
- Shalom Brune-Franklin as Brigitte Russell-Bailey, Isabella's daughter who Daniel had dated when they were teenagers
- Leo Suter as Nicholas Hale, Cherry's ex-boyfriend
- Karen Henthorn as Tracey Laine, Cherry's mother
- Francesca Corney as Millie De Polgnac, Nicholas' fiancée and later wife
- Ben Miles as Max Kader
- Marina Bye as Pandora Henry
- Anna Chancellor as Lillith Greenway

== Episodes ==
No.	Title	Directed by	Written by	Original release date
1	Episode 1	Robin Wright	Naomi Sheldon; Gabbie Asher	10 September 2025
Laura Sanderson, a wealthy art gallery owner in London, is introduced to her son Daniel's new girlfriend, Cherry Laine, a real estate agent. Laura greets her warmly, though she is immediately struck by differences between Cherry's working-class background and their own lifestyle. Over dinner, Cherry tries to make a good impression, sharing stories about her work and interests, while Laura listens closely. Laura begins to notice small inconsistencies in Cherry's accounts of her education and experiences, which cause her to grow wary. Later, Laura observes further details that increase her unease: she comes across a piece of jewellery in Cherry's bag similar to her own and witnesses Cherry arguing heatedly with a man from her past. From Cherry's perspective, Laura is rather cold and distant. Although Daniel appears comfortable with the relationship, Laura becomes increasingly suspicious of Cherry's motives and honesty.
2	Episode 2	Robin Wright	Marek Horn; Polly Cavendish	10 September 2025
Daniel invites Cherry to spend a holiday with his family in Spain. Although he offers to pay for a business-class flight, Cherry books a cheaper ticket and uses the extra money to shop, later changing her clothes at the airport to preserve appearances. When she arrives, Cherry meets Laura, Howard, and Laura's friend Isabella and her daughter, Daniel's childhood friend, Brigitte, who had a past intimate relationship with Daniel, which unsettles Cherry. During the holiday, Cherry struggles to fit in. She plays tennis with Brigitte and Daniel and accidentally hits Brigitte with a shot, leading to tension. Cherry worries about Laura's disapproval, especially after Laura discovers inconsistencies in Cherry's story, such as her flight details. Cherry bonds with Howard, Daniel's father, who opens up about the loss of their infant daughter Rose before Daniel's birth. Later, Daniel and Cherry go for a bike ride and stop at a natural pool, bonding and sharing histories; Cherry turns off Daniel's phone to avoid Laura's constant messages. On a yacht day, Cherry falls into the water after losing her balance while paddleboarding. Laura jumps in and rescues her, though Cherry had concealed that she cannot swim. This leads to a moment of connection between Cherry and Laura, who begin to soften towards one another. However, at a wine-tasting event the next day, Laura sees a viral video featuring a prank at Nicholas and his wife Millie's wedding, realises Cherry lied about some details, and confronts her, with both women now keen to secure Daniel's allegiance.
3	Episode 3	Robin Wright	Ava Wong Davies; Polly Cavendish	10 September 2025
Daniel shows Laura the apartment he intends to move into with Cherry. Laura voices concern but Daniel insists on independence. Cherry grows anxious about Laura's investigations into her past as Daniel's birthday approaches. Laura contacts Nicholas and his wife Millie, who reveal troubling episodes from Cherry's former relationship, including instability and a restraining order. Daniel, however, dismisses Laura's warnings and sides with Cherry. When the birthday trip begins, Cherry and Daniel visit Wintour's Leap, where Daniel proposes to Cherry, who happily accepts, and proceed to go rock climbing. During the climb, Daniel slips and sustains a serious head injury. He is rushed to hospital in critical condition. Laura and Howard arrive, tense and fearful. At the hospital, the prognosis looks dire: doctors tell Laura and Howard to prepare for the worst. Laura calls Cherry to inform her that Daniel has died—though at that moment Daniel is still alive and beginning to show signs of responsiveness.
4	Episode 4	Andrea Harkin	Isis Davis; Smita Bhide	10 September 2025
Laura drives to Daniel and Cherry's apartment intending to confess that Daniel is alive, after having told Cherry he died. She arrives to find Cherry tidying up, with signs that Daniel's credit card has been used and that Cherry is wearing his clothing. Cherry asks about a funeral and Laura lies that there already was a small, private service. Laura then takes Daniel's laptop, learns Cherry's passwords, blocks Cherry from his social media, and alters his phone so messages from Cherry go to Laura instead. Meanwhile, Cherry, believing Daniel is dead, attempts to make sense of the situation: she buys a suit for the funeral with Daniel's credit card, continues to call and text him, and tries to find out where he is buried. Her apartment is cleared out, she is forced to move in with her mother, and she loses her real estate job after Laura hacks her professional account in an effort to distance her even further from Daniel. Meanwhile, Daniel is recovering in Spain under Laura's care. When Cherry meets with a potential investor, Max Kader, and mentions Daniel's death, she is shocked to see him alive in the same location, sitting in a restaurant with Laura.
5	Episode 5	Andrea Harkin	Helen Kingston	10 September 2025
Cherry confronts Laura in front of Daniel, exposing Laura's lies about Daniel's death and the fake funeral. Daniel feels betrayed and hurt by his mother, while Cherry insists that Laura's deceptions have disrupted their relationship during Daniel's recovery. Laura begins to lose control both in her personal and professional life. She misses a significant appointment when her assistant, Harriet, does not call her; in frustration, Laura fires Harriet. Harriet responds by launching an online campaign accusing Laura of unfair dismissal and files a lawsuit against her. Laura seeks comfort in Lilith, her artist friend and ex-lover and convinces her to be showcased at her gallery. Howard finds out and angrily ends their relationship. Despite mounting pressure, Laura moves forward with her gallery's plans, signing Lilith, for an upcoming exhibition. On the night of the exhibition, Cherry attends and Laura takes her aside. An argument breaks out and Cherry is injured when she hits her head with a champagne glass (which shatters) during the confrontation and frames Laura. The incident becomes a public spectacle in the gallery. Meanwhile, Daniel reveals that his memory prior to his accident is hazy but recalls that he had proposed to Cherry. In an attempt to salvage their relationship, Daniel proposes once again.
6	Episode 6	Andrea Harkin	Naomi Sheldon	10 September 2025
Daniel and Cherry return home after shopping for an engagement ring. Cherry expresses disappointment when Daniel suggests keeping their engagement private, but he later agrees to announce it. Meanwhile, Laura confronts Daniel outside the hospital, accusing him of believing her to be violent. He reveals their engagement and insists on being left alone. Howard returns home and packs his belongings, expressing his support for Cherry and criticising Laura. Laura, feeling betrayed, investigates Cherry's past and discovers that her father, John, is alive and residing in a nursing home. She learns that John suffered a spinal injury after falling from a building and becomes suspicious of Cherry's involvement. Cherry vandalises Lilith's artwork, leading her to be arrested and straining Laura's relationship with Lilith. Cherry's mother gives her a fake alibi and she is subsequently released. Daniel confronts Laura and announces that he will cut ties with her. Laura drugs Daniel and tries to give him a recording of Cherry's mother expressing her concerns about Cherry's past. However, Cherry arrives and the two become involved in a struggle, ending in the basement where Laura threatens her with a knife and accusing her of destroying her family. The confrontation escalates, and both women fall into the pool. Daniel, in a drugged state, intervenes, holding Laura underwater while attempting to protect Cherry. Laura drowns, and Daniel, realizing the tragic outcome, is left in shock. A year later, Daniel and Cherry are married and expecting a child. Daniel discovers the recording on Laura's phone, leaving him to question the true nature of his relationship with Cherry.

== Production ==
The project was first reported in May 2024, with Gabbie Asher and Naomi Sheldon adapting the Michelle Frances novel for the television series, with episodes also written by Marek Horn, Ava Wong Davies, Polly Cavendish, Isis Davis, Helen Kingston, Smita Bhide, and Matt Evans; Asher is also an executive producer. Robin Wright is executive producer, as well as directing and starring. Jonathan Cavendish, Will Tennant, and Phil Robertson of Imaginarium Productions executive produce along with John Zois, Dave Clarke, and Frances. The series is also produced by Amazon MGM Studios for their Amazon Prime Video streaming service. Caroline Norris is series producer.

Wright is joined in the lead cast by Olivia Cooke, Laurie Davidson and Waleed Zuaiter. In August 2024, Anna Chancellor, Francesca Corney, Shalom Brune-Franklin, Karen Henthorn, Leo Suter, and Tanya Moodie joined the cast in series regular roles.

Principal photography began in June 2024 in London. Filming also took place in Spain.

== Release ==
The six-episode miniseries became available to stream on Amazon Prime Video beginning 10 September 2025.

== Reception ==
=== Critical response ===
The review aggregator website Rotten Tomatoes reported an 88% approval rating, based on 48 critic reviews, with an average rating of 7.6/10. The website's critics consensus reads: "Robin Wright and Olivia Cooke are terrific at behaving badly in The Girlfriend, a twisty thriller that strains credulity with so much aplomb that audiences won't mind." Metacritic gave the series a weighted average score of 70 out of 100, based on 20 critics, indicating "generally favorable" reviews.

IndieWire's Proma Khosla gave the series a B−, writing, "The Girlfriend is exactly the kind of psychological and soapy binge to kick off the fall TV season, easily devoured in one indulgent sitting with a cheeky drink and lots of yelling at the screen."

=== Accolades ===
Accolades received by The Girlfriend
Award	Year (Note: Indicates the year of ceremony)	Category	Recipient(s)	Result	Ref.
Astra TV Awards	2026	Best Limited Series	The Girlfriend	Pending	
Astra TV Awards	2026	Best Directing in a Limited Series or TV Movie	The Girlfriend	Pending	
Astra TV Awards	2026	Best Limited Series or TV Movie Cast Ensemble	The Girlfriend	Pending	
Critics' Choice Awards	2026	Best Limited Series	The Girlfriend	Nominated	
Critics' Choice Awards	2026	Best Actress in a Limited Series or Movie Made for Television	Robin Wright	Nominated	
Golden Globe Awards	2026	Best Television Limited Series, Anthology Series, or Motion Picture Made for Television	The Girlfriend	Nominated	
Golden Globe Awards	2026	Best Performance by a Female Actor in a Limited Series, Anthology Series, or Motion Picture Made for Television	Robin Wright	Nominated	
Guild of Music Supervisors Awards	2026	Best Music Supervision in a Television Drama	Matt Biffa	Nominated	
Satellite Awards	2026	Best Actress in a Miniseries, Limited Series, or Motion Picture Made for Television	Robin Wright	Won	
Women Film Critics Circle	2025	Best TV Series	The Girlfriend	Nominated	
