= Caught in Treetops =

Caught in Treetops is a concerto for solo violin and chamber ensemble by the British composer Charlotte Bray. The work was commissioned by the Birmingham Contemporary Music Group and Sound and Music. It was first performed on 14 November 2010 at the CBSO Centre, Birmingham by the violinist Alexandra Wood and the Birmingham Contemporary Music Group under conductor Oliver Knussen. The piece is dedicated to the Birmingham Contemporary Music Group.

== Composition ==
Caught in Treetops has a duration of roughly 16 minutes and is composed in two numbered movements. The piece was inspired by the poems "A Match with the Moon" by Dante Gabriel Rossetti and "The Moon Sails Out" by Federico García Lorca, which Bray described as her "central muse." The opening cadenza was inspired by the saxophonist Sonny Rollins's "Autumn Nocturne." Much of the composition was developed from a solo violin piece Bray had previously written for Wood.

=== Instrumentation ===
The work is scored for a solo violin and a chamber ensemble comprising a flute, oboe, clarinet, horn, trumpet, trombone, percussion, harp, piano, viola, and cello.

== Reception ==
Reviewing the world premiere, Stephen Walsh of The Arts Desk called the music "intricate and self-absorbed, sonorities like birdsong in the upper branches, seldom coming to the ground but finely heard and very cleverly scored for a dozen instruments." Ivan Hewett of The Daily Telegraph similarly lauded, "Charlotte Bray’s light-footed mini-violin concerto Caught in Treetops seized the image of the moon in Dante Gabriel Rossetti sonnet." Igor Toronyi-Lalic of The Arts Desk called the work "intriguing" and wrote:

An obsessive violin line attempts to bounce its way out of its predicament through arpeggio runs to the G string. When the orchestra joins the outstanding soloist Alexandra Wood, primitive, André Jolivet-like harmonies creep into earshot and drag the work into a sultry slow section. Her orchestration was rather tasty. Her shifting evocations were cleanly and interestingly explored. I'd be very interested to hear the work again.

Richard Whitehouse of Gramophone praised the "powerful concertante writing" of the piece and lauded the "tensile cadenza which duly casts its aura over the respectively capricious and meditative movements."
