= Up to No Good (TV series) =

British television series

- Genre: Drama
- Based on: An Elderly Lady Is Up To No Good; An Elderly Lady Must Not Be Crossed by Helene Tursten
- Written by: Nina Raine; Moses Raine
- Directed by: Lee Haven Jones
- Starring: Glenn Close; Claudia Jessie; Penelope Wilton; Meera Syal
- Country of origin: United Kingdom
- Original language: English
- No. of series: 1
- No. of episodes: 6

Production
- Executive producers: Colin Callender; Glenn Close; Scott Huff; Moses Raine; Nina Raine; Lee Haven Jones
- Producer: Morenike Williams
- Cinematography: Bryan Gavigan
- Running time: 46 minutes
- Production companies: Sony Pictures; Playground

Original release
- Network: Channel 4

Up to No Good is an upcoming British television drama series starring Glenn Close, Penelope Wilton, Meera Syal, Anna Marshall and Claudia Jessie for Channel 4.

== Premise ==
Maud Oldcastle has had a lifetime of caring for her sister, but also has killer secrets.

== Cast ==
- Glenn Close as Maud Oldcastle
  - Eva Bannister as young Maud
- Penelope Wilton as Charlotte
- Claudia Jessie as Hannah
- Meera Syal as Margaret
- Gloria Obianyo as Astrid
- Anita Dobson as Elsa
- Ben Crompton as Barry
- Tanya Reynolds
- Mathew Baynton as Paul Oyle
- Iain Glen
- Raphaël Acloque
- Nadia Albina
- Louisa Binder
- Meg Bellamy
- Madeleine Mantock
- Peter Egan
- Richard E. Grant
- George Harrison as Darren

== Production ==
The six-part series was confirmed by Channel 4 in August 2025 with the working title Maud. Written by Nina Raine and Moses Raine, the series is adapted from the short story collections An Elderly Lady Is Up To No Good and An Elderly Lady Must Not Be Crossed by Helene Tursten. It is produced by Playground and Sony Pictures Television. Glenn Close was confirmed as an executive producer and part of the cast in August 2025.

Filming took place in London at the start of 2026, with the title confirmed as Up to No Good, and Lee Haven Jones as director. Claudia Jessie, Penelope Wilton and Meera Syal joined Close in the cast alongside Gloria Obianyo, Anita Dobson and Ben Crompton. Additional cast members include Richard E. Grant, Tanya Reynolds, Iain Glen and Mathew Baynton.

== Broadcast ==
The series will air in the United Kingdom on Channel 4.
