= Gloria Obianyo =

English actress

- Born: Ealing, London
- Education: Rose Bruford College
- Occupation: Actress
- Years active: 2016–present

Gloria Obianyo is a British stage, film and television actress. She won the Ian Charleson Award for her role as Neoptolemus in Paradise by Kae Tempest at the Royal National Theatre.

== Biography ==
Obianyo was born in Ealing and raised in London. She attended The Ellen Wilkinson School for Girls in Acton. She became interested in theatre as a 12 year-old when she saw a local amateur production of High School Musical and appeared in amateur dramatics as a teenager, later training at Rose Bruford College in acting and music. She is also a photographer.

=== Stage ===
Obianyo made her professional debut in 2016, the year she left drama school, in the Timothy Sheader production of Jesus Christ Superstar and shortly afterwards in The Grinning Man at Bristol Old Vic. She was Charmian and also understudy to Sophie Okonedo's Cleopatra in Antony and Cleopatra at the Royal National Theatre.

Obianyo also appeared in the London West End in a production of Girl from the North Country at the Gielgud Theatre. She appeared in A Christmas Carol at London’s Old Vic, and one of the editions of the Living Newspaper at London’s Royal Court Theatre, as well as a Yael Farber-directed production of King Lear at the Almeida Theatre in London, Obianyo also appeared at the Almeida in productions The Clinic and Next Please: The Keyworkers Cycle. Other stage credits included Maryland at the Royal Court Theatre.

She won the Ian Charleson Award for her role as Neoptolemus in Paradise by Kae Tempest at the Royal National Theatre.

In 2025, she appeared as Rosalind in a Ralph Fiennes directed production of As You Like It alongside Harriet Walter, Dylan Moran, and Patrick Robinson. In October 2026, she won for Best Supporting Performance (in a Musical or Play) for her performance in the play, at the 2026 UK Theatre Awards.

=== Film & Television ===
Obianyo's film role have included the science-fiction horror film High Life (2018), the English-language feature debut of Claire Denis, alongside Robert Pattinson and Mia Goth, and parts in science-fiction film Dune (2021) and the Mission Impossible sequel Mission Impossible: Dead Reckoning (2023).

On television, Obianyo's roles have included Good Omens for Amazon Prime Video and Feel Good for Channel 4. She appeared in The Road Trip (2024) and historical fantasy series Outlander. In 2025, she could be seen in long-running BBC medical drama series Silent Witness, and ITV historical drama A Cruel Love: The Ruth Ellis Story. After an appearance in Disney+ series Andor, in 2026, she was cast in Up to No Good for Channel 4 alongside Glenn Close, Penelope Wilton and Meera Syal.

== Partial filmography ==
=== Film and television ===
| Year | Title | Role | Notes |
|---|---|---|---|
| 2018 | High Life | Elektra | Film |
| 2019-2023 | Good Omens | Uriel | 8 episodes |
| 2021 | Dune | Female Fremen | Film |
| 2023 | Mission Impossible: Dead Reckoning | Osprey Agent | Film |
| 2024 | Eric | Angela | 3 episodes |
| 2024 | Outlander | Mercy Woodcock | 3 episodes |
| 2024 | The Road Trip | Ila | 4 episodes |
| 2025 | Silent Witness | DS Blake | 2 episodes |
| 2025 | A Cruel Love: The Ruth Ellis Story | Joy | 4 episodes |
| 2025 | Andor | Snee | 2 episodes |
| TBA | Up to No Good† | | Filming |

=== Video games ===
| Year | Title | Role | Notes |
|---|---|---|---|
| 2022 | The Dark Pictures Anthology: The Devil in Me | Jamie Tiergan (voice) | |
