= Summerfolk =

1904 play by Maxim Gorky

Summerfolk (Russian: Дачники, romanized: Dachniki) is a play by Maxim Gorky written in 1904 and first published in 1905 by Znaniye (1904 Znaniye Anthology, book Three), in Saint Petersburg.

Full of characters who "...might have stepped out of a Chekhovian world", it takes place in 1904—the same year that Anton Chekhov died. The play dramatises the Russian bourgeois social class and the changes occurring around them. In Russia the play premiered on 10 November 1904 at the Komissarzhevskaya Theatre in Saint Petersburg.

The British premiere of the play was given by the Royal Shakespeare Company at the Aldwych Theatre in London on 27 August 1974. It was adapted by Jeremy Brooks and directed by David Jones, who, with Brooks, introduced several of Gorky's plays to Britain.

Nick Dear adapted the play for a production on London's Olivier stage, part of the Royal National Theatre, in 1999. A new adaptation of the play (written by siblings Nina Raine and Moses Raine) ran at the Olivier from 6 March to 29 April 2026.

== Associated awards ==
- The Royal National Theatre, London produced Summerfolk in 1999. Trevor Nunn on 22 November 1999 won the 1999 Evening Standard Theatre Award for Best Director for The Merchant of Venice and Summerfolk. He also won the Critics' Circle Theatre Awards and Laurence Olivier Award for Best Director.
