= At the Speed of Stillness =

Studio album by Charlotte Bray
- Released: 2014
- Genre: 21st century music
- Length: 70 mn
- Label: NMC Recordings NMCD202

At the Speed of Stillness is an orchestral composition in one movement by the British composer Charlotte Bray. The work was commissioned by The Proms for the conductor Sir Mark Elder and the Aldeburgh World Orchestra. It was first performed July 29, 2012 at the Proms by the Aldeburgh World Orchestra under Sir Elder. The piece is dedicated to the British composer Mark-Anthony Turnage.

== Composition ==
At the Speed of Stillness is composed in a single movement and has a duration of roughly 11 minutes. The composition was partially inspired by the poem "I rested in the arms of my arms" by Dora Maar. Bray also cited the Sizewell power station near her home as inspiration for the piece.

=== Instrumentation ===
The work is scored for an orchestra comprising four flutes, three oboes, four clarinets, three bassoons, four horns, three trumpets, three trombones, tuba, timpani, four percussionists, harp, piano, and strings.

== Reception ==
Reviewing the world premiere, Andrew Clements of The Guardian wrote, "Inspired by a poem by the surrealist Dora Maar, Bray's piece is a scherzo whose energy seems at first unfocused, but which gradually coalesces into stomping rhythms and a massive climax, before retracing its harmonic steps to where it all began. The musical plan is lucid, the scoring deft and polished." Zachary Woolfe of The New York Times also lauded the piece, saying it "managed the difficult feat of evoking ceaseless motion without feeling driven: It gave a sense of pulsating in place." Richard Whitehouse of Gramophone wrote, "At the Speed of Stillness unfolds over an expansive orchestral canvas – the paradox of motion within stasis (whether in the written word or in physical power-lines) underlying a piece whose highly diverse textures outline an expressive progression left tantalisingly in abeyance at the close."

Eric C. Simpsons of the Boston Classical Review was somewhat more critical, writing, "Bray's work has a good deal of sonic variety, though its purpose is hard to divine. Pulsing, toe-tapping rhythms permeated the work, but it remained impenetrable."
