= A Cruel Love: The Ruth Ellis Story =

2025 British television series about the 1955 Ruth Ellis case

- Genre: Historical drama
- Based on: A Fine Day For Hanging: The Real Ruth Ellis Story by Carol Ann Lee
- Screenplay by: Kelly Jones
- Directed by: Lee Haven Jones
- Starring: Lucy Boynton; Toby Jones
- Country of origin: United Kingdom
- Original language: English
- No. of series: 1
- No. of episodes: 4

Production
- Executive producer: Kate Bartlett
- Producer: Angie Daniell
- Editor: David Fisher
- Production companies: Silverprint Pictures; ITV Studios

Original release
- Network: ITVX; BritBox
- Release: 17 February 2025 (United States); 5 March 2025 (United Kingdom)

A Cruel Love: The Ruth Ellis Story, originally titled Ruth, is a four-part British historical drama television series for ITV, starring Lucy Boynton as Ruth Ellis, the last woman hanged in Britain, and Toby Jones as her solicitor John Bickford. It was released in the United States on BritBox on 17 February 2025.

== Synopsis ==
Ellis was the last woman to be executed in the United Kingdom. She was convicted of murder following the fatal shooting of her abusive lover.

== Cast ==
- Lucy Boynton as Ruth Ellis
- Toby Jones as John Bickford, Ellis's solicitor during her murder trial
- Laurie Davidson as David Blakely, Ellis's lover, abuser, and eventual murder victim
- Mark Stanley as Desmond Cussen, a former RAF pilot who was a suitor to Ellis and who Ellis described as providing her with the revolver she used to kill Blakely (though Cussen would always deny this)
- Joe Armstrong as DCI Leslie Davies, lead detective on the murder case
- Arthur Darvill as Victor Mishcon QC, Ellis's barrister during her divorce case
- Juliet Stevenson as Dr Charity Taylor, governor of HMP Holloway during Ellis's confinement and eventual execution
- Toby Stephens as Melford Stevenson QC, Ellis's barrister during her murder trial
- Paul Hilton as Christmas Humphreys, the prosecuting barrister
- Amanda Drew as Bertha, Ellis's mother
- Nigel Havers as Justice Cecil Havers, the judge presiding over Ellis's murder trial. Later known as Lord Havers, Cecil was Nigel Havers's grandfather.
- Ed Sayer and Bessie Carter as Anthony and Carole Findlater, friends of Blakely
- Audrey Brisson as Jacqueline, a friend of Ellis
- Rowan Robinson as Vicki Martin, Model, actress and friend of Ellis

== Production ==
The project was produced by Silverprint Pictures for ITVX and is based on Carol Ann Lee's biography A Fine Day For Hanging: The Real Ruth Ellis Story; according to Silverprint creative director Kate Bartlett, the series came to be when she was told about the book's existence by one of Ellis' grandsons. The script was written by Kelly Jones with Angie Daniell producing the series and Lee Haven Jones directing all four episodes.

The series was originally entitled Ruth, but on 19 February 2024, ITV announced the series' retitling to A Cruel Love: The Ruth Ellis Story and released a first-look image of Lucy Boynton in character as Ellis.

=== Casting ===
In June 2023, Lucy Boynton was cast as Ruth Ellis. In September 2023 it was revealed the cast would also include Toby Jones, Laurie Davidson, Mark Stanley, Joe Armstrong, Arthur Darvill, Juliet Stevenson and Toby Stephens.

=== Filming ===
Studio filming took place at Troubadour Meridian Water Studios in September 2023. Location filming took place in October 2023, with scenes being shot in or around the Magdala Tavern and the former magistrates court in Hampstead where the real Ruth Ellis was arraigned. Scenes taking place in HMP Holloway were filmed at the Historic Dockyard Chatham in Kent (representing the entrance) and Dorchester Prison (representing the rest of the prison). Scenes taking place in the Old Bailey were mostly filmed in a reconstruction of its interiors at University College School (again in Hampstead), though the real interior does appear in some scenes.

Courtroom scenes were filmed in accordance with the original trial documents; while this verbatim recital of the transcripts was a legal requirement rather than a deliberate creative decision, both Bartlett and Boynton felt that it still served to enhance the factual accuracy and the emotional aspect of the series.

== Release ==
The series was first released via the BritBox service, with the first two episodes being released on 17 February 2025 and the remaining two episodes being released on subsequent Mondays. The series then began airing weekly on ITV1 from 5 to 26 March 2025, with a streaming release on ITVX also happening on 5 March.

== Reception ==
The Times' Carol Midgley gave the series four stars out of five. While mostly concerned with the real-life aspects of the story, she did remark that Boynton's "quietly haunting performance" as Ellis was delivered with "charismatic nuance" and that the fourth episode (which focuses on the last days of Ellis' life) was the "most affecting"; she also said that Nigel Havers playing his own grandfather "felt a touch creepy" but he managed to do it "well" nonetheless.

Writing in The Daily Telegraph, Anita Singh also gave the series four stars out of five, calling it "a thought-provoking drama powered by a strong central performance from Lucy Boynton, who seems to offer little more than clipped tones and a gimlet glare in the early scenes but comes into her own in the final episode". Singh felt that Havers playing his own grandfather was "a neat bit of casting"; she also said that, compared to the earlier Dance with a Stranger, A Cruel Love lacked chemistry between Ellis and Blakely and that the series' general portrayal of Blakely was "forgettable, but perhaps that's intentional in a drama that wants to reframe the case with Ellis as the victim."

A third rating of four stars out of five was given by Julia Raeside of the i Paper, saying that the series was "polished and beautifully shot" and that "[o]n the whole, the programme succeeds" in "tread[ing] the line carefully between worthy drama and just another opportunity to rubberneck at [Ellis']s downfall". Raeside believed that Boynton's portrayal of Ellis was "resolute, full of quiet fight as the odds begin to stack against her and she seems to almost run towards her fate, unafraid. Boynton is undoubtedly the sun here, with the rest of the cast orbiting around her considerable light." Toby Jones was "typically tender" as John Bickford, while Mark Stanley "balances [Desmond Cussen]'s pride and wretchedness perfectly, setting him up as a significant player in what will follow." The script was "nicely spare" and "offers sympathy for the determined heroine but seems to skirt mention of her relationship with her children. [...] There are no tender scenes of a mother torn between financial survival and her maternal duties."

A further four-star review appeared in the Independent, written by Phil Harrison. Boynton's Ellis was, he felt, "equal parts insolent charisma and wary vulnerability, a woman so accustomed to withstanding life's hard knocks that she finds it difficult to let her guard down under any circumstances." Jones was "as superb as ever" in his portrayal of Bickford. Harrison perceived a "bubbling polemical undercurrent, centred around class as well as gender", in the series.

Yet another four-star review was written in the London Standard by Vicky Jessop. In her estimation, Toby Jones was "on characteristically excellent form" as Bickford, "[t]he closest thing we have to a sympathetic character [...] whom he manages to imbue with a sort of battered, weary morality." Jessop did feel that the series' constant chronological shifts were "disorienting, to start with, and lends the episodes a muddled, blurry kind of feeling. Where it excels, though, is by showing us just how heavily the cards were stacked against Ruth, even from the beginning."

In a slightly less positive review, The Guardian's Rebecca Nicholson gave the series three stars out of five, saying that Ellis's case was "a sad and complex story, and while the performances are excellent, this solid four-parter can only march them grimly towards their inevitable conclusion." Nicholson felt that the most effective element of A Cruel Love was its portrayal of the complexity of Ellis's life and that the cast's performances were "outstanding", but nevertheless the series sometimes felt "hamstrung and never quite feels as if it gets to know Ellis [...] It picks up pace towards the end and the final episode is much more cohesive [...] But it wades through a lot of murk before it gets there." A separate review by Barbara Ellen for The Observer, then the Guardian's sister paper, did not employ a scoring system; Ellen wrote that it was initially "hard to warm to Boynton's chilly, unsympathetic Ellis", but later on "Boynton brings Ellis's humanity and vulnerability to the fore [...] and it's very powerful." Ellen added that the series was "marred by crass melodrama, including preparation for the hanging (dangling nooses et al), though arguably the barbarity of capital punishment should be shown."

Another three-star review appeared in the Financial Times, with the paper's Dan Einav saying that the series' "layering of timelines, though structurally fiddly, allows a more multi-faceted image of Ellis to emerge", with Boynton giving a "fine lead performance. There [were] strong supporting turns too" from Davidson and Jones. "But the series' power [was] often attenuated by overripe production and a heavy-handed script that risks turning a thorny true story into stagy melodrama."

== Accolades ==
Award	Year of ceremony	Category	Recipient(s)	Result	Ref.
British Society of Cinematographers	2026	Best Cinematography in a Television Drama (UK Terrestrial)	"Episode Two" - Bryan Gavigan	Nominated	
