= Fire Burning in Snow =

Composition by Charlotte Bray

Fire Burning in Snow is a composition for mezzo-soprano solo and chamber ensemble by the British composer Charlotte Bray. The work was commissioned by the Birmingham Contemporary Music Group with the support of individual donors in memory of the arts administrator Jack Phipps. It was first performed on June 18, 2013 at the Aldeburgh Festival by mezzo-soprano Lucy Schaufer and the Birmingham Contemporary Music Group. The piece is set to three poems by Nicki Jackowska. Bray dedicated the composition to Jackowska and to the memory of the composer Jonathan Harvey.

== Composition ==
Fire Burning in Snow has a duration of roughly 11 minutes and is composed in three movements set to the poems of Nicki Jackowska, which Bray described as "a collection portraying lost love and a search for a way forward from this 'place'." The movements are thus titled:

1. Moonshot
2. Loose Ends
3. Occupations

The work is scored for solo mezzo-soprano and a chamber ensemble comprising oboe/cor anglais, B♭ clarinet/bass clarinet, violin, and cello.

== Reception ==
Reviewing the world premiere, Fiona Maddocks of The Guardian praised Fire Burning in Snow and said it "was vividly delivered by mezzo-soprano Lucy Schaufer, who even wore red shoes to match a line in Nicki Jackowska's poems." George Loomis of The New York Times also lauded the work, writing:

The music has an austerity that suits the poems, yet an emotional current runs through the cool yet singable vocal lines that allows the singer to express the feelings behind the sometimes cryptic words. Instruments are interestingly used, as when string harmonics and a mournful oboe suggest the icy locale where the singer’s lover ought to be. Ms. Bray is a composer whom we could be hearing more from.

Richard Whitehouse of Gramophone said the piece "sets poems by Nicki Jackowska whose focusing on lost love elicits a fervent response and the most tenuous of emotional resolutions."
