= Entanglement (opera) =

Entanglement is a one-act chamber opera by the British composer Charlotte Bray and the librettist Amy Rosenthal. The work was commissioned by the Nova Music Opera and was first performed on 6 July 2015 at the Cheltenham Music Festival, with the conductor George Vass leading soprano Kirsty Hopkins, baritone Howard Croft, tenor Greg Tassell, and the Nova Music Opera Ensemble.

== Background ==
Bray described the inspiration for Entanglement in the score program notes, writing:

The gripping story of Ruth Ellis and her entangled life with racing-car driver David Blakely and lonely businessman Desmond Cussen is one that needs to be told. Love, romance, anguish, and abuse—the tragic story itself has all the drama needed to create a gripping and powerful opera. Timeless and universal in many regards, especially with the debate over capital punishment continuing today. In the summer of 1953, nightclub manageress Ruth Ellis meets two men with whose lives her own will be fatally intertwined. As lonely businessman Desmond Cussen loses his heart to her, so Ruth loses hers to troubled racing-car driver David Blakely, with whom she spirals into a violent and obsessive co-dependence. Set amidst the grubby glamour of London in the Fifties, Entanglement charts two years in the lives of the trio as they are driven towards their tragic destiny – and the act that will see Ruth Ellis defined forever as the last woman to be hanged in Britain.

== Composition ==
Entangled is written in a single act and has a duration of roughly 40 minutes.

=== Instrumentation ===
The work is scored for a soprano, tenor, and baritone, and a chamber ensemble comprising flute, clarinet, percussion, violin, cello, and double bass.

== Roles ==
Role	Voice type	World premiere cast, 6 July 2015 (Conductor: George Vass)
Ruth Ellis	soprano	Kirsty Hopkins
David Blakeley	tenor	Greg Tassell
Desmond Cussen	baritone	Howard Croft

== Reception ==
Reviewing the world premiere, Rian Evans of The Guardian praised the opera, writing, "Bray and Rosenthal are at pains to go deeper into Ellis's story than her defence team did at the time, emphasising her abusive relationship with the shallow Blakely (tenor Greg Tassell), her anger at being rejected by his friends, and the apparent complicity of a former lover, Desmond Cussen (baritone Howard Quilla Croft), whose gun was her weapon. The tangled question is reopened: was this a crime of passion or a cold-blooded murder? Kirsty Hopkins commanded attention as the peroxide-blonde Ellis, steely and needy, implying an impassive and obsessive nature alongside moments of maternal behaviour." Richard Bratby of The Arts Desk also praised the work, opining:

Dramatically, Amy Rosenthal's lucid, naturalistic libretto gives the composer plenty to work with, and over the course of its five short scenes Entanglement manages to create two genuinely credible characters, and to sketch in one other. As one corner of the love-triangle, the tenor Greg Tassell sang the part of David Blakeley with a dash and a sweetness straight out of Puccini – with music to match Ruth Ellis's deluded vision of her abusive lover. If the drama has a weakness, it's that we didn't, perhaps, see enough of him to feel the roots of that delusion, though in Kirsty Hopkins's concentrated, eerily beautiful performance as Ruth, we certainly felt its consequences. Bray's music for Ruth veers from poignant, expressive arioso ("I'm not the kind of girl he could take home to meet his parents") to chilling calm in the two final scenes, where she coolly dismisses the future of her children and invites her own death by hanging.

He added, "Simply staged by director Richard Williams with minimal lighting and back-projected captions, and eloquently conducted by Vass, Entanglement created characters that live with you after the drama has ended: a sure-fire sign that it needs to be seen again, and soon."

However, Richard Morrison of The Times was more critical of the work, remarking, "With lurid subjects ripped from the tabloid headlines of 60 years ago, this new operatic double bill at the Cheltenham Festival should have been more gripping than it was."
