= Areté =

British arts magazine

- Front cover of Areté issue 20, 2006
- Categories: Literary magazine
- Frequency: triannual
- Founder: Craig Raine
- First issue: Winter 1999; 27 years ago
- Country: United Kingdom
- Based in: Oxford
- Language: English
- OCLC: 1064455043

Areté was an arts magazine, published three times a year, edited and founded in 1999 by the poet Craig Raine. The magazine aimed to give detailed coverage of theatre, fiction, and poetry, while also serving as a platform for new writing in all genres. Raine has described its editorial policy as to "publish anything we like. The result is a magazine catholic in its taste ... . The purpose of any literary magazine is the correction of taste, the creation of mischief and entertainment—and the discovery of new writers."

The magazine published contributions by a wide range of authors, including Ian McEwan, Patrick Marber, Tom Stoppard, and Julian Barnes. It has also promoted new authors such as Adam Thirlwell, Jeremy Noel-Tod, Sam Gardiner, Hannah Sullivan, Peter Morris, James Womack and Tom Welsford. Members of Craig Raine's immediate family such as his wife Ann Pasternak Slater and children Moses and Nina Raine were also frequent contributors.

One of the publication's defining features was "Our Bold", in which the editorial team took sloppy critics to task. (An index of "Our Bold" from issues 1–34 appeared in issue 35, Autumn 2011). The magazine prided itself on high editorial standards and on close and accurate reading where others appear to have read superficially. Unashamedly nostalgic for the informed critical discourse of magazines such as the Paris Review, it was strongly associated with New College, Oxford, where its editorial offices were. The journal's trademark feather, or quill, which adorned its cover was created by the British artist Mark Alexander.

The journal's name is the Greek word for "virtue", and the journal was prefaced by a quotation from Paideia: The Ideals of Greek Culture by Werner Jaeger:

The Greeks felt that areté was, above everything else, a power, an ability to do something. Strength and health are the areté of the body; cleverness and insight the areté of the mind.

In April 2013, lapsed subscribers received a letter from Craig Raine which read as follows:

We have reason to believe that you have let your Areté subscription lapse. You should know that under byelaw 2771 of January 2003 (the Impoverished Little Magazines Act), this an offence with inevitable penalties, including: loss of intellectual credibility, increased risk of cerebral atrophy, collateral damage to your funny bone, restriction of your social circle, and spot checks by the Our Bold inspectorate.

In May 2013, Areté published its 40th issue, a 504-page retrospective including pieces by, among others, William Boyd, Ralph Fiennes, Prue Leith and Anne Robinson. The book was reviewed by Nicholas Lezard in the Guardian who observed that "There are close to 50 pieces in here, and they range all over the shop. They are also all very good."

In the 20 September 2020 issue of the Times Literary Supplement, Craig Raine stated that “We have decided to close Areté with issue 60. When we started in 1999, I thought 32 issues would be admirable. With the lockdown, the logistics of producing a magazine have become very difficult.”
