= The Sun Was Chasing Venus =

The Sun Was Chasing Venus is a composition for string quintet by the British composer Charlotte Bray. The work was commissioned by the violinist Daniel Hope and the Savannah Music Festival. It was first performed at the Savannah Music Festival on 3 April 2014 by the Dover Quartet and violist Daniel Lee.

== Composition ==
The Sun was Chasing Venus is composed in a single movement and has a duration of roughly 15 minutes. Bray described the composition in the score program notes, writing:

Driven with frenetic energy, The Sun was Chasing Venus is through-composed, vividly moving between contrasting sections. Featuring the violas in an expressive dialogue is a slower, hazy episode which gives way to a violin solo with sparse, rhythmic accompaniment. Brisk music returns in a playful, excitable section, before a cadenza-like cello solo.

Additionally, Bray explained the title of the piece as "an abstract description of the work" that "represents the idea of a game of pursuit; musical lines chasing each other, out of which comes a sense of journey."

=== Instrumentation ===
The work is scored for a string quintet comprising two violins, two violas, and cello.

== Reception ==
George Loomis of the Financial Times called the piece "a fine 15-minute work" and added, "there was much textural variety and ample evidence of the composer’s keen musical ear and stylistic rigour."
