= Carol Ann Lee =

English author and biographer (born 1969)

- Born: 20 March 1969 (age 57); Wakefield, West Riding of Yorkshire, England, UK
- Education: University of Manchester
- Occupations: Author, biographer
- Writing career
- Language: English
- Genre: Non-fiction
- Notable works: A Fine Day for a Hanging (2012), Evil Relations (2012), One of Your Own (2010), The Hidden Life of Otto Frank (2003)
- Website: www.carolannlee.co.uk

Carol Ann Lee (born 20 March 1969) is an English author and biographer who has written extensively on Anne Frank, the Holocaust and on the crimes of Moors Murderers Myra Hindley and Ian Brady.

== Early life and education ==
Carol Ann Lee was born in Wakefield, in the West Riding of Yorkshire, on 20 March 1969.

She studied history of art and design at the University of Manchester and then followed her early interest, interviewing Holocaust survivors and working at the Manchester Jewish Museum.

== Career ==
Lee's first book was published three years after graduating.

Her tenth book, Evil Relations (2012), was nominated for the Crime Writers' Association's Gold Dagger Award for Non-Fiction. Written in conjunction with David Smith, chief prosecution witness in the Moors Murders case, the book details, for the first time, Smith's story in full.

In 2012, Lee published A Fine Day for a Hanging: The Ruth Ellis Story, a re-examination of Ruth Ellis's life story and the facts surrounding her trial and subsequent execution for the murder of David Blakely.

Lee is published by Mainstream Publishing, an imprint of Random House.

== Works ==
=== Non-fictional ===
- 2000, Roses from the Earth: The Biography of Anne Frank (Penguin Books).
- 2001, Anne Frank's Story (Puffin Books).
- 2003, The Hidden Life of Otto Frank (Penguin Books).
- 2006, Anne Frank and the Children of the Holocaust (Viking Press).
- 2010, One of Your Own: The Life and Death of Myra Hindley (Edinburgh: Mainstream).
- 2011, with David Smith. Witness: The Story of David Smith, Chief Prosecution Witness in the Moors Murders Case (Edinburgh: Mainstream); published in 2012 as Evil Relations: The Man Who Bore Witness Against the Moors Murderers (Edinburgh: Mainstream).
- 2012, A Fine Day for a Hanging: The Ruth Ellis Story (Edinburgh: Mainstream).
- 2015, The Murders at White House Farm (London: Sidgwick & Jackson).
- 2020, with Peter Howse. The Pottery Cottage Murders (Robinson)
- 2024, Something Wicked: The Lives, Crimes and Deaths of the Pendle Witches (London: John Blake)

=== Fictional ===
- 2007, The Winter of the World (Harper Perennial).

== Television adaptations ==
The Murders at White House Farm was used, along with another book, interviews, and other research, by Australian screenwriter Kris Mrksa for his screenplay for the successful ITV drama White House Farm released by HBO Max in 2020.

A Fine Day for a Hanging: The Ruth Ellis Story was adapted into the ITV drama A Cruel Love: The Ruth Ellis Story, with Ellis being portrayed by Lucy Boynton.
