= Guy Johnston =

British cellist (born 1981)

- Born: 7 May 1981 (age 45); Harpenden, England
- Genres: Classical
- Instrument: Cello
- Website: www.guy-johnston.com

Guy Johnston (born 1981) is a British cellist and the winner of the BBC Young Musician of the Year award in 2000. He has subsequently enjoyed a successful international career as a soloist and chamber musician and currently serves as an associate professor of Cello at the Eastman School of Music in Rochester New York.

== Career ==
At the age of eight, Johnston became a chorister at King's College, Cambridge and combined singing with the cello. He then attended Chetham's School of Music, Manchester from 1996 to 1999 and studied under acclaimed cellist Steven Doane before going to the Eastman School of Music in Rochester, New York, United States.

Johnston came to prominence after winning the BBC Young Musician of the Year competition in 2000, where he notably broke a string playing Shostakovich's Cello Concerto No. 1. In the following year he made his concerto debut at The Proms performing Edward Elgar's Cello Concerto with Leonard Slatkin and the BBC Symphony Orchestra. He was named "Young British Classical Performer" of the year at the 2002 Classic Brit Awards.

Johnston has since performed concertos with leading British orchestras including the London Philharmonic, BBC Philharmonic, City of Birmingham Symphony Orchestra, Manchester Camerata, the Philharmonia, English Chamber Orchestra, BBC Scottish Symphony, Royal Scottish National Orchestra, Royal Liverpool Philharmonic Orchestra, BBC National Orchestra of Wales and the Northern Sinfonia, and in Europe, the Middle and Far East with the Deutsches Symphonie-Orchester, St Petersburg Symphony Orchestra, São Paulo Symphony Orchestra, Osaka Philharmonic Orchestra, Orchester der Hessischer Rundfunk and Musikkollegium Winterthur.

Johnston's performances and recordings are regularly broadcast on BBC Radio 3 and Classic FM.

He was a founding member of the Aronowitz Ensemble, which was invited into the BBC Radio 3 New Generation Artists scheme for 2006–2008, guaranteeing regular feature presentations on BBC Radio 3 and other media over the two-year period.

His instrument is a 1714 David Tecchler cello.

In August 2016, Johnston performed the world premiere of Charlotte Bray's cello concerto Falling in the Fire at The Proms.

=== Recording work ===
Johnston recorded David Matthews' Concerto in Azzurro with Rumon Gamba and the BBC Philharmonic Orchestra, released on the Chandos label in 2009. The recording was nominated for a Gramophone Award in the Contemporary Music category.

Johnston released his debut recital disc Milo in May 2010 on the Orchid label with the pianist Kathryn Stott. The disc comprises British 20th-century music including the Cello Sonatas by Benjamin Britten and Frank Bridge and works "Sleep On" and "Milo" by Mark-Anthony Turnage. Turnage wrote the latter for the christening of his son, Milo. Johnston premiered the work at Milo's christening and is his godfather.

Johnston recorded the Duruflé Requiem with Christine Rice (mezzo-soprano), Mark Stone (baritone), Tristan Mitchard (organ), The Choir of Somerville College, Oxford, and David Crown (conductor), released on the Stone Records label in 2012.

Johnston was awarded a Classical BRIT Award for Young British Classical Performer in 2001.

== Personal life ==
Johnston was born to a musical family. His parents David and Gill run Musicale, a music school and instrument retailer in Harpenden. He has two brothers, Magnus and Rupert, and they have a younger sister Brittany "Izzy". All three brothers were choristers at King's College Chapel, Cambridge and educated at its affiliated school. Magnus has enjoyed a successful career as a violinist and chamber musician and is married to Dutch violinist Marije Ploemacher. Izzy was a member of the electronic string quartet Escala and is married to McFly drummer Harry Judd. Rupert, who plays the French horn, sustained a serious brain injury in a car accident in 1997, as an eighteen-year-old student at Guildhall. As a result, Johnston, his siblings, and Judd have supported the Brain Injury Rehabilitation Trust (Brainkind) through their charity work. Johnston married economic historian Ali Digby at her family home, Minterne House, Dorset, in May 2018.
