= The Road Trip (TV series) =

2024 Television series

- Genre: Comedy drama
- Based on: The Road Trip by Beth O'Leary
- Written by: Matilda Wnek; Ryan O'Sullivan; Phoebe Eclair-Powell; Waleed Akhtar
- Directed by: China Moo-Young; Stella Corradi
- Starring: Emma Appleton; Laurie Davidson; David Jonsson; Isabella Laughland; Dinita Gohil; Angus Imrie
- Country of origin: United Kingdom
- Original language: English
- No. of seasons: 1
- No. of episodes: 6

Production
- Executive producers: Miriam Brent; Rory Aitken; Eleanor Moran
- Producer: Nikki Wilson
- Production companies: 42; VIS

Original release
- Network: Paramount+
- Release: 26 December 2024

The Road Trip is a 2024 British comedy drama television series based on Beth O'Leary's novel of the same name. The series was developed by 42 in association with VIS for Paramount+. The series premiered on Paramount+ on 26 December 2024.

== Synopsis ==
A romantic comedy, Addie (Appleton) is attending her friend Cherry's (Gohil) wedding in Spain with her sister Deb (Laughland), but is forced to car-share with her ex, Dylan (Davidson) and his best friend Marcus (Jonsson), as well as a total stranger (Imrie).

== Cast ==
=== Main ===
- Emma Appleton as Addie
- Laurie Davidson as Dylan
- David Jonsson as Marcus
- Isabella Laughland as Deb
- Dinita Gohil as Cherry
- Angus Imrie as Rodney
- Adrian Lukis as Miles

=== Recurring ===
- Karan Gil as Krish
- Gloria Obianyo as Ila
- Isobel Akuwudike as Bria
- Hannah Dodd as Grace
- Michael Wallace as Etienne

== Production ==
The six-part series has 42 producing in association with PTIS – the international studio division of Paramount Global. Nikki Wilson is series producer with Kingsley Hoskins as co-producer.

The series has writers including Matilda Wnek, Ryan O'Sullivan, Phoebe Eclair-Powell and Waleed Akhtar. China Moo-Young and Stella Corradi are set to direct. It has Miriam Brent, Rory Aitken and Eleanor Moran as executive producers.

Filming commenced in Bristol, England, and Gran Canaria in 2023. Filming locations included Clifton, Bristol.

== Release ==
The six-part series became available on Paramount+ on 26 December 2024 in the United Kingdom, Canada and Australia.
