= Falling in the Fire =

2016 cello concerto by Charlotte Bray

Falling in the Fire is a cello concerto by the British composer Charlotte Bray. The work was commissioned by BBC Radio 3 for The Proms. Its world premiere was performed by the cellist Guy Johnston and the BBC Symphony Orchestra conducted by Sakari Oramo at the Royal Albert Hall on 14 August 2016. The piece was inspired by the destruction of the ancient city of Palmyra by ISIL in August 2015. Falling in the Fire is composed in a single movement and has a duration of approximately 21 minutes.

== Composition ==
=== Background ===
Bray began composition on the concerto in August 2015, as she first read the news about the destruction of the Temple of Bel and the Temple of Baalshamin in the ancient city of Palmyra. Bray decided to conceive the work as an abstract reflection on the conflict of the Syrian civil war and the war on ISIL. In a pre-premiere interview with the magazine i, Bray recalled, "I started researching into this ancient city and everything to do with it. And I felt compelled to do something about the world we live in now."

While researching for the piece, she learned of the photojournalist Tim Hetherington, who was killed in 2011 while covering the Libyan Civil War. Before his death, Hetherington noted his irrational compulsion to return to conflict zones, preferring to report the atrocities of war from the front rather than remain in the idle safety of home. Bray used this duality as the basis for the musical conflict in the concerto, occasionally even simulating the sounds of the battlefield in the orchestra.

=== Instrumentation ===
The work is scored for a solo cello and a large orchestra consisting of three flutes, three oboes, three clarinets, three bassoons, four horns, three trumpets, three trombones, tuba, timpani, three percussionists, harp, and strings.

== Reception ==
The piece was praised by Martin Kettle of The Guardian, who wrote, "The concerto confronts two important, linked questions with which many creative artists have wrestled: how can a composer respond to the great public issues of the day – in this case the war in Syria – and how can any such response avoid being judged on moral as much as on musical grounds? Bray's concerto sensibly embodies these questions rather than answering them." Steph Power of The Independent similarly observed, "Propelled by outrage at the atrocities visited upon Syria by Isis, Bray has responded with music that is defiantly exquisite as well as stark, for example, with the high-ringing tinnitus that follows a bomb explosion. Surging with energy, her colouristic writing was acutely felt by both the orchestra and brilliant soloist Guy Johnston."

Barry Millington of the London Evening Standard remarked, "Passages of repetitive jagged material, perhaps alluding to the firing of arms, alternate with poignant interludes that suggest altered states of consciousness." He nevertheless added, "The cello soloist (Guy Johnston) meditates on the situation, but is not always clearly audible. One senses that the original commission of a cello concerto proved incompatible with the conception as it took shape. The work has some original, inspired touches, but it's a brave composer that attempts a piece of such attenuated introspection in a big space like the Albert Hall."
