= Cecil Havers =

English barrister and High Court judge

Sir Cecil Havers
- Mr Justice Havers in 1958, by Walter Bird

Judge of the High Court
- In office 9 May 1951 – 30 September 1967

Personal details
- Born: Cecil Robert Havers; 12 November 1889 Norwich, Norfolk, England
- Died: 5 May 1977 (aged 87)
- Spouse: Enid Snelling (m. 1916)
- Children: 4
- Education: Corpus Christi College, Cambridge
- Military career
- Allegiance: United Kingdom
- Branch: British Army
- Service years: 1915-1939
- Rank: Captain
- Units: 5th Battalion Hampshire Regiment (Territorial Force); Royal Tank Regiment
- Conflicts: World War I

Sir Cecil Robert Havers (12 November 1889 – 5 May 1977) was an English barrister and High Court judge.

== Early life ==
Havers was born in Norwich, where his father was a solicitor. He was educated at Norwich Grammar School and then at Corpus Christi College, Cambridge, graduating with a first-class BA in classics in 1912 and an LLB in 1913. He played tennis for the University of Cambridge, and played in the men's doubles in the 1926 Wimbledon Championships with Basil Lawrence, winning a first-round match in five sets and then losing in the second round.

During the First World War, he was commissioned as a temporary second lieutenant in 5th Battalion of the Hampshire Regiment (Territorial Force) in January 1915, was promoted to temporary Lieutenant in June 1915 and temporary Captain in February 1916. He was transferred to serve as Acting Captain with the Tank Corps in April 1918, and then temporary Captain in February 1919. He was mentioned in dispatches in December 1918 while serving with the Tank Corps.

Having reached the age limit for military service, he retired on 12 November 1939 with the rank of Captain.

== Legal career ==
Havers was called to the Bar at Inner Temple in 1920, coming top of the bar examinations, and "took silk" to become a King's Counsel in 1939. He served as recorder of Chichester from 1939 to 1951. He also served as a judge in the Gold Coast in 1944-45, and as a Commissioner of Assize in the midlands in 1949. He became a bencher at Inner Temple in 1946, and served as Treasurer in 1971. He was elected as an honorary fellow of Corpus Christi in 1975.

Havers was appointed a High Court judge in 1951, being assigned to the Probate, Divorce and Admiralty Division, and received the customary knighthood. He was transferred to the King's Bench Division in 1952.

Havers was the trial judge who presided over the conviction of Ruth Ellis for murder in 1955. Ellis was the last woman to be sentenced to death and executed in the United Kingdom. In a 2010 television interview his grandson, the actor Nigel Havers, revealed that his grandfather had written to the Home Secretary recommending a reprieve as he regarded it as a crime passionnel, but received a curt refusal. He subsequently sent money annually for the upkeep of Ellis's son.

Havers retired as a full-time judge in 1967, and became Deputy Dean of the Arches in 1970.

== Family ==
Havers married Enid Snelling in 1916. They had one daughter, Elizabeth Butler-Sloss, and three sons, Tony, David, and Michael Havers.

His youngest son, Michael, served as Solicitor General from 1972 to 1974, as Attorney General from 1979 to 1987 and then briefly as Lord Chancellor; his daughter Elizabeth became the first female Lord Justice of Appeal in 1988 and the first female President of the Family Division of the High Court in 1999.

Through his son Michael, Havers' grandsons are Philip Havers, a King's Counsel, and Nigel Havers, the actor.

== In popular culture ==
- In the 1980 ITV drama Lady Killers, Sir Cecil Havers was portrayed by actor Robert Flemyng.
- In the 2025 ITV drama A Cruel Love: The Ruth Ellis Story, Sir Cecil Havers was portrayed by actor Nigel Havers, who is his real-life grandson.
