= Black Rainbow (composition) =

Black Rainbow is an orchestral composition in two movements by the British composer Charlotte Bray. The work was commissioned by the City of Birmingham Symphony Orchestra and was first performed in Birmingham on February 23, 2014, by the CBSO Youth Orchestra under conductor Jac van Steen.

== Composition ==
Black Rainbow has a duration of roughly 12 minutes and is composed in two movements. The music was inspired by the design of the Pageant Amphitheater at the MacDowell Colony in Peterborough, New Hampshire, which Bray described as a "stunning space" with "intense, powerful energy." She wrote in the score program notes:

The work is an expression of imagined scenes played out here. A rainbow seen at night can be referred to as a black rainbow; difficult to see, the colors are often hidden; a metaphor for something sought after but impossible to attain, an alluring ongoing search.

She also described the nature of the two movements, adding, "The first movement is dark and ritualistic. It’s mid summer and the air is tight, uncomfortable. The light grey, purple almost. The second is fleeting, sensual; time is suspended, a dream-like state."

=== Instrumentation ===
The work is scored for an orchestra comprising three flutes, three oboes, three clarinets, three bassoons, four horns, three trumpets, three trombones, tuba, timpani, three percussionists, harp, and strings.

== Reception ==
Reviewing the world premiere, Norman Stinchcombe of the Birmingham Post described Black Rainbow as "short (...) but spectacular, with a battery of brass and percussion and a demanding role for the orchestra's excellent wind section." He added, "The hushed opening with muted growling brass was suitably menacing and if the central trumpet ostinato outstayed its welcome the gradual manoeuvre from manic energy to questioning quiet, and the handling of large orchestral forces, was skillfully done." Martin Dreyer of The Press similarly remarked that the piece "carried a sense of menace through its 12 minutes, leaning mainly on brass and timpani for its spare effects. Its fascination lay in its internal rhythms and clear textures." Colin Anderson of Classical Source said it "comes off superbly as absolute music" and wrote, "It’s another striking piece from Bray, full of and inspired by theatrical imagination."
