= Stephen McNeff =

Irish composer (born 1951)

Stephen McNeff (born 6 September 1951) is an Irish composer, best known for his work in contemporary theatre and opera.

== Biography ==
Stephen McNeff was born in Belfast and grew up in south Wales. He studied composition at the Royal Academy of Music and undertook post-graduate research at the University of Exeter. He was Associate Director of Manchester University's Contact Theatre in 1979−80. From 1980−84, as Composer in Residence and Associate Director of the Music Theatre Studio Ensemble of the Banff Centre and then Comus Theatre Canada, he won a Dora Mavor Moore Award for his opera The Secret Garden (1985) based on the novel by Frances Hodgson Burnett. His theatre music in the 1990s saw McNeff receive a Scotsman award for the National Youth Music Theatre production of Aesop at the 1991 Edinburgh Festival before an unconventional staging of T.S. Eliot's The Wasteland by the Donmar for the BOC Covent Garden festival in 1994 brought him wider attention. He was appointed 'Composer-in-the-House' with the Bournemouth Symphony Orchestra in 2005 and later became Composer in Residence. During his three-year tenure, he wrote a number of major works for the Bournemouth Symphony Orchestra and its contemporary counterpart Kokoro.

Since 2002 McNeff has been a Visiting Artist of Dartington International Summer School, South West Music School, and Trinity Laban Conservatoire of Music and Dance. He is currently on the composition staff of Guildhall School of Music and Drama.

== Selected works ==
Operas

- 2117/Hedd Wyn (2017), libretto by Gruff Rhys. Recording released by Ty Cerdd Records in 2022.
- The Burning Boy (2017), libretto by Charles Causley.
- The Last King of Scotland (for 2013) after the novel by Giles Foden has been commissioned by Banff and Trinity Laban. An extract was performed by the commissioning conservatoire's students at the ROH2's Exposure series in 2012
- The Chalk Legend (2012) a Dorset-based community opera, libretto by Richard Williams
- Daughter Of The Elements (2011) based on the life and work of Marie Curie, first performed at the 2011 Tête à Tête Opera Festival
- A Voice Of One Delight (2010) scena for mezzo-soprano, to a text by Percy Bysshe Shelley and Edward John Trelawny, premiered at the Presteigne festival
- Pelléas et Mélisande (2008) a chamber re-orchestration of Claude Debussy's opera for the Independent Opera Company.
- Tarka The Otter (2007) based on the novel by Henry Williamson, winner of the 2007 British Composer Award for Stage Work
- Gentle Giant (2007) based on the novel Michael Morpurgo
- What I Heard About Iraq (2006) settings of Eliot Weinberger's aphoristic poems on the post 9/11 Iraq conflict for Opera North
- Clockwork (2004) based on the children's novel by Philip Pullman
- Names Of The Dead (2003)
- Matins for the Virgin of Guadalupe (2001)
- The Secret Garden (1985)

Other vocal

- Madrigali dell'Estate (2009) for mezzo-soprano to poems by Gabriele d'Annunzio
- Cities of Dreams (2008) for baritone solo, SATB choir and orchestra with texts by Rudyard Kipling, Walt Whitman and William Blake.
- Near Avalon: An Ancient Journey (2008) for the Ulster Orchestra and Ulster Youth Choir
- Dissolve me into Ecstasies (2008) for soprano, tenor and baroque ensemble to a text by John Milton
- Weathers (2007)
- The Unknown (2006) five poems by Edward Thomas
- Four Tales from Beatrix Potter (2002–05) adapted by Adrian Mitchell
- More Need (2002) for soprano to a text by John Hegley

Orchestral and chamber works

- Seven For A Secret (2011) adaptation of Maurice Ravel's L’Enfant et les sortilèges for the Rambert Dance Company
- Concert Duo (2010) percussion concerto for the Borletti-Buitoni Trust and BBC Symphony Orchestra
- LUX (2008)
- Savage Amusements(No. 1) (2007)
- Counting 1 & 2 (2007)
- Sinfonia (2007)
- Echoes and Reflections (2006)
- Reeling (2005)
- Secret Destinations (2005)
- Heiligenstadt (2005)
- Clarinet Concerto (2005)
- Cello Sonata (Falling Man) (2003)
- Piano Quintet (2002)
- Ghosts (2001) for wind ensemble
