= The Pocket Orchestra =

The Pocket Orchestra is a play written by Graeme Garden, with the music scored by Callum McLeod. It ran in London at Trafalgar Studios 2 from 26 April 2006 until 20 May 2006. The idea was devised by Callum McLeod after putting together a concert of his father's favourite pieces of classical music arranged for small groups of musicians. The director was Richard Williams, the designer David Collis and the lighting designer David Horn.

Subtitled "The Unlikely Lives of the Great Composers", it is a 90-minute history of classical music told through the lives of the great composers. Twenty-six composers are featured on stage during the course of the show, which features live performances from a cast of six actor/musicians who were Sebastian Bates, Emma Correlle, Karen Fisher-Pollard, Ella Smith, Paul Arden-Griffiths, Ian Harris and additionally has former Doctor Who star Sylvester McCoy as the host (or Showman) who guides the audience through the performance. Features of the show included singing a laundry list to "Largo al Factotum" from The Barber of Seville, a short snippet of John Cage's 4′33″ and Sylvester McCoy playing the Spoons.
