= Craig Raine =

English poet (born 1944)

Craig Anthony Raine, FRSL (born 3 December 1944) is an English contemporary poet. Along with Christopher Reid, he is a pioneer of Martian poetry, a movement that expresses alienation with the world, society and objects. He was a fellow of New College, Oxford, from 1991 to 2010 and is now emeritus professor. He was the editor of Areté from 1999 to 2020.

== Early life ==
Raine was born in Bishop Auckland, County Durham, the son of Norman Edward and Olive Marie Raine. His father was the North of England amateur boxing champion in 1937. He then worked as a bomb armourer for the RAF, until forced to retire due to epilepsy caused by a skull fracture. After the RAF his father worked as a pub landlord. Craig Raine was raised in a prefab in Shildon, a town near Bishop Auckland. He won a scholarship to Barnard Castle School, where he lived as a boarder. Of his time there he has recalled that it seemed that everyone else's parents seemed to be:

accountants or surgeons or something. I couldn't say my father was an ex-boxer who did faith healing, had epileptic fits and lived off a pension. So for a while I said he was a football manager. But by the end I was inviting my friends home and they thought he was just as terrific as I did.

Raine has commented on his education: "At Barnard Castle I was taught by an absolutely remarkable English teacher, Arnold Snodgrass, a friend of W. H. Auden at Oxford [and later Robert Graves]. There was no question that he altered my mindset on things and made me very critical." At school he wrote "'pimply Dylan Thomas' poems, some of which he sent to Philip Toynbee, then lead reviewer at The Observer".

Raine received his university education at Exeter College, University of Oxford, where he received a BA in English and later received his B.Phil.

== Career ==
Raine taught at Oxford and followed a literary career as book editor for New Review, editor of Quarto, and poetry editor at the New Statesman. He became poetry editor at publishers Faber and Faber in 1981, and has been a fellow of New College, Oxford, since 1991, retiring from his post as tutor in June 2010. He was elected a Fellow of the Royal Society of Literature in 1984.

In 1972 he married Ann Pasternak Slater, a now retired fellow of St Anne's College, Oxford. They have one daughter and three sons. Moses Raine is a playwright and Nina Raine a director and playwright.

Raine is founder and editor of the literary magazine Areté and a frequent contributor. His works include a number of poetry collections: The Onion, Memory (1978), A Martian Sends a Postcard Home (1979), A Free Translation (1981), Rich (1984), History: The Home Movie (1994), and Clay. Whereabouts Unknown (1996). His reviews and essays are collected in two anthologies: Haydn and the Valve Trumpet (1990) and In Defence of T. S. Eliot (2000). A short critical-biographical study of Eliot, T. S. Eliot: Image, Text and Context, was published in 2007.

His friend Ian McEwan argues that Raine espouses "very strong and clear, almost Arnoldian, ideas of literature and criticism".

== Books ==
=== Poetry collections ===
- The Onion, Memory, Oxford University Press, 1978. ISBN 0-19-211877-3.
- A Journey to Greece, Sycamore Press, 1979
- A Martian Sends a Postcard Home, Oxford University Press, 1979. ISBN 0-19-211896-X.
- A Free Translation, Salamander, 1981
- Rich, Faber and Faber, 1984
- The Prophetic Book (bilingual edition with Polish translation by Jerzy Jarniewicz), Correspondance des Arts, 1989
- History: The Home Movie, Penguin, 1994
- Change, Prospero Poets, 1995
- Clay: Whereabouts Unknown, Penguin, 1996
- Collected Poems 1978–1999, Picador, 1999
- A la recherche du temps perdu, Picador, 2000
- How Snow Falls, 2010

=== Fiction ===
- Heartbreak, Atlantic, 2010
- The Divine Comedy, Atlantic, 2012

=== Drama ===
- 1953: A Version of Racine's Andromaque, Faber and Faber, 1990

=== Libretto ===
- The Electrification of the Soviet Union, Faber and Faber, 1986, opera by Nigel Osborne

=== Criticism ===
- Haydn and the Valve Trumpet, Faber and Faber, 1990
- In Defence of T. S. Eliot, Picador, 2000
- T. S. Eliot: Image, Text and Context, Oxford University Press, 2007
- More Dynamite: Essays 1990–2012, Atlantic, 2013
- My Grandmother's Glass Eye: A Look at Poetry, Atlantic, 2016

=== As editor ===
- A Choice of Kipling's Prose, Faber and Faber, 1987
- Rudyard Kipling: Selected Poems, Penguin, 1992
- New Writing 7, (co-editor) Vintage, 1998
