= Beth O'Leary =

British writer (born 1992)

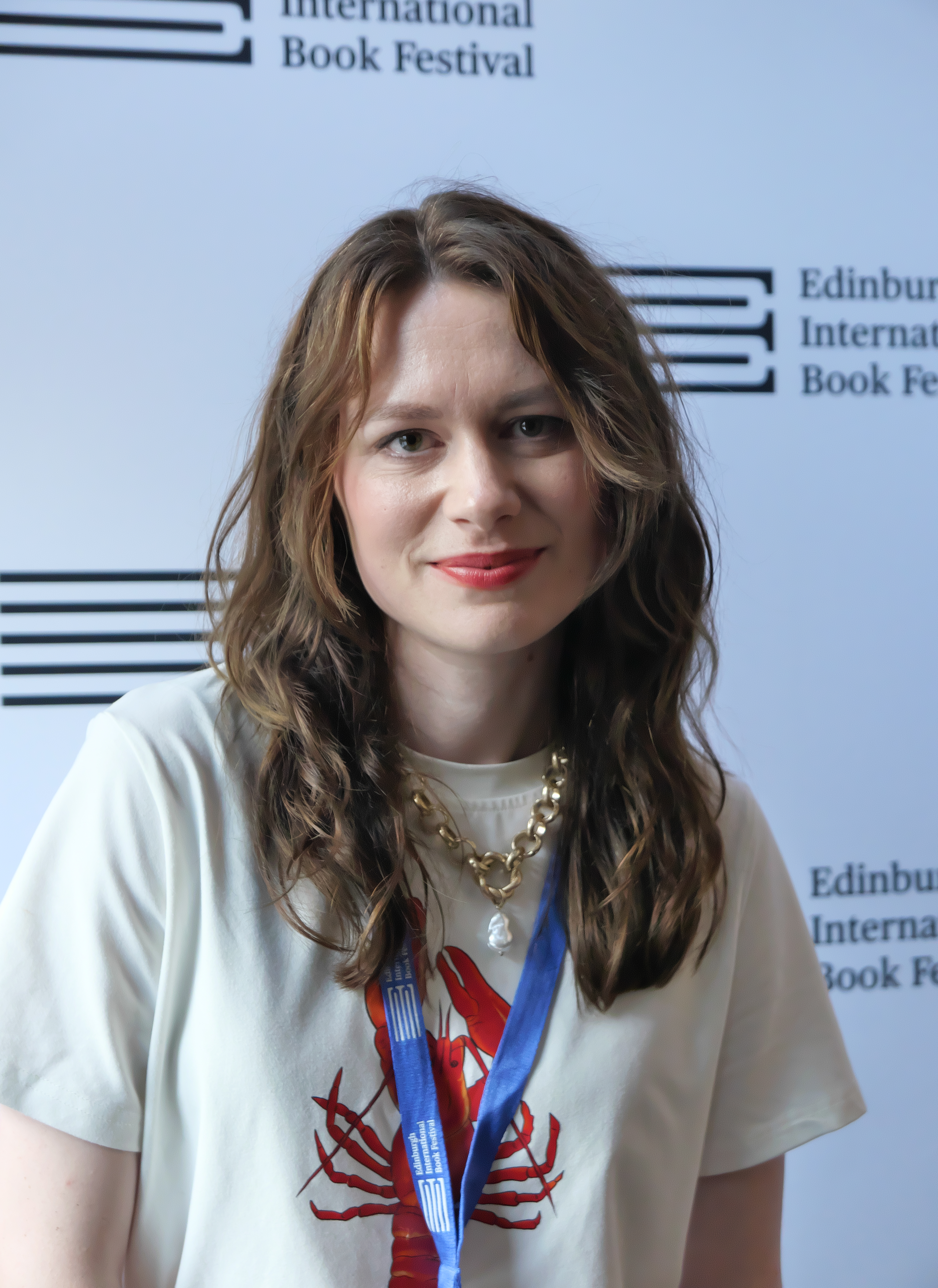
- O'Leary in 2025
- Born: Beth Alice O'Leary; 16 May 1992 (age 34); Hammersmith, London, England
- Education: St John's College, Oxford
- Years active: 2019–present
- Children: 2
- Website: www.betholearyauthor.com

Beth Alice O'Leary (born 16 May 1992) is an English author of romantic comedy novels. Her first novel The Flatshare (2019), sold over a million copies, is available in over 30 languages and was nominated for a Comedy Women in Print Prize. Since then she has published four more books, namely: The Switch, The Road Trip, The No-Show and The Wake-Up Call; with her upcoming sixth novel, Swept Away, set to be published in Spring 2025.

== Life and career ==
O'Leary was born in West London and grew up in Winchester, the youngest of six children. Her family also fostered children, so there were often more than her five siblings in the house. She has some Irish heritage. O'Leary attended the Westgate School and Peter Symonds College. She graduated from St John's College, Oxford in 2010 with a degree in English.

O'Leary is an introvert and often used reading as an escape from the activity of life. She loved to visit her local library, which she still visits today. She credits her parents' patience taking her to this library often for her becoming a writer. She wrote from a young age and always dreamed of becoming an author. She began sending her writing to literary agents in her late teens.

Following university, O'Leary worked at an academic press and in children's publishing. She lived in London for a few years before moving back to Winchester. She began writing young adult fiction, and wrote her debut novel whilst commuting between Winchester and her job in London. It was her debut novel The Flatshare that allowed her to realise she could be successful as an author. Tanera Simons, a literary agent at Darley Anderson Agency, wrote back to O'Leary to discuss her manuscript and helped her develop it before bringing it to editors and publishers. It was published by Quercus Books in the UK and Flatiron Books in the US, followed by the rest of the world. It was printed in over 30 countries.

As of 2024, O'Leary lives in Hampshire and is a full-time writer. She had her first child, a boy, in 2021. She gave birth to a second child, a daughter, in 2024. She and her husband and children live together along with their golden retriever.

== Adaptations ==
There was a ten part abridged reading adaptation of The Flatshare on BBC Radio 4 on 19 April 2021. This was originally published in January 2020 on BBC Sounds. Since then, it has been adapted into a comedy drama series of the same name for Paramount+ and premiered on the platform on 1 December 2022.

Rights were acquired by Amblin Pictures to adapt The Switch into a film in May 2020.

O'Leary's novel The Road Trip has been adapted into a TV series for Paramount+ and was released on 26 December 2024.

== Inspiration ==
O'Leary's favourite authors include Marian Keyes; David Nicholls; Jane Austen; Charles Dickens; Maria Edgeworth and Gillian McAllister. Growing up, she read fantasy novels and enjoyed love stories. In her childhood years she read books by Terry Pratchett and Tamora Pierce. Some books O'Leary has enjoyed include Rachel's Holiday by Marian Keyes, Pride and Prejudice by Jane Austen and Half a World Away by Mike Gayle.

The Flatshare was a unique instance of her writing, as usually her ideas come together from different ideas over the course of time. Her debut novel, however, was inspired by a situation from O'Leary's personal living situation. Her and her now-husband shared a flat but rarely saw each other due to their work shift times. She began to wonder if it would be possible for two strangers to live this way, and how it might develop.

O'Leary's characters do not arrive to her fully formed. She says that she learns about them as she writes their story.

== Bibliography ==
- The Flatshare (2019)
- The Switch (2020)
- The Road Trip (2021)
- The No-Show (2022)
- The Wake Up Call (2023)
- Swept Away (2025)
- The Name Game (2026)
