= Laurie Davidson (actor) =

English actor (born 1992)

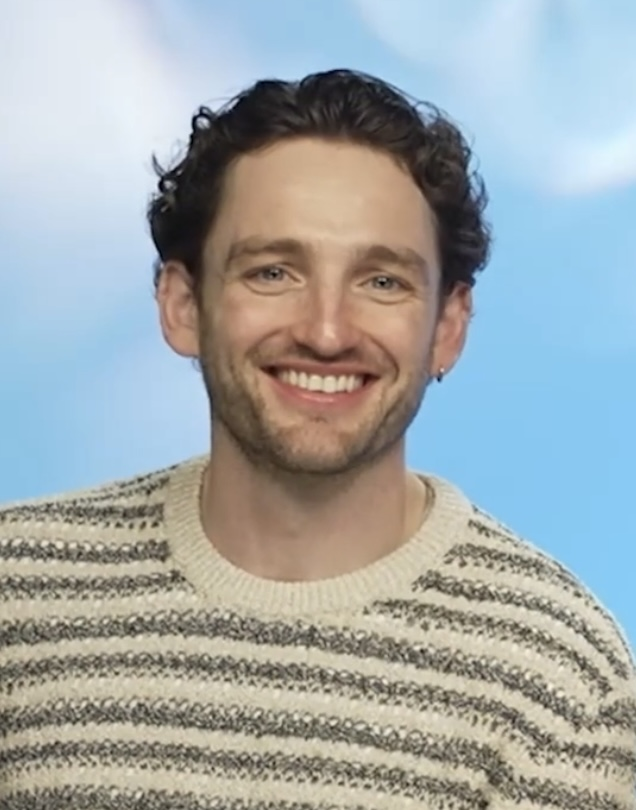
- Davidson in 2026
- Born: 29 January 1992 (age 34); Dulwich, London, England
- Education: London Academy of Music and Dramatic Art
- Years active: 2013–present

Laurie Davidson (born 29 January 1992) is an English actor. On television, he is known for his roles in the TNT series Will (2017), the Paramount+ series The Road Trip (2024), the ITV series A Cruel Love (2025), and the Amazon Prime series The Girlfriend (2025).

== Early life ==
Laurie Davidson was born 29 January 1992 in the Dulwich neighbourhood of South London and attended Dulwich College.

He is a 2016 graduate of the London Academy of Music and Dramatic Art (LAMDA).

== Career ==
After arriving at LAMDA, he earned a part in Anton Chekhov's The Seagull, which is where his agent first noticed him. Davidson was a newcomer to television prior to his Will casting; his prior work included stage work and a minor role in the film Vampire Academy. He has also been cast in the BBC film Diana & I as a journalist who is present at the time of the death of Princess Diana.

=== Will ===
A casting director for Yorgos Lanthimos' The Favourite suggested that he audition for Will. He had several rounds of auditions. Just as school was set to resume following Christmas of his final year at LAMDA and as he was set to play Tevye in a school production of Fiddler on the Roof, he was informed in January 2016 that he was cast in Will, and he dropped out of Fiddler to shoot the show's pilot.

To prepare for his modern take on Shakespeare, Davidson did not focus on modern depictions of Shakespeare, such as Joseph Fiennes performance in Shakespeare in Love, but he did use Straight Outta Compton and 8 Mile for inspiration, on the advice of director Shekhar Kapur. He also relied on the works attributed to Shakespeare to learn about him. TNT picked up the show in May 2016, but Davidson graduated from LAMDA in July 2016—on schedule. Will premiered on 10 July 2017.

=== Cats ===
In September 2018, he joined the cast of Cats.

== Filmography ==
†	Denotes works that have not yet been released

=== Film ===
Year	Title	Role	Notes
2014	Vampire Academy	Party Host	Uncredited
2019	The Good Liar	Hans Taub	
2019	Cats	Mr. Mistoffelees	Motion capture performance
2023	The Last Kingdom: Seven Kings Must Die	Ingimundr	
2026	The Surgeon		

=== Television ===
Year	Title	Role	Notes
2017	Will	William Shakespeare	Main role, 10 episodes
2017	Diana and I	Michael Lewis	Television film
2021	Guilty Party	George	Main role, 10 episodes
2022	The Sandman	Mark Brewer	1 episode
2024	Masters of the Air	Lt. Herbert Nash	Miniseries, 1 episode
2024	Mary & George	Robert Carr, 1st Earl of Somerset	Miniseries, 3 episodes
2024	The Road Trip	Dylan	Main role, 6 episodes
2025	A Cruel Love: The Ruth Ellis Story	David Blakely	Miniseries, 4 episodes
2025	The Girlfriend	Daniel "Danny" Sanderson	Main role, 6 episodes
2026	The Other Bennet Sister	William Ryder	Main role, 7 episodes
2026	Prisoner	Declan Dempsey	Main role, 5 episodes

=== Theatre ===
Year	Title	Role	Theatre	Notes
2017	The Ferryman	Shane Corcoran	Gielgud Theatre	Replacement cast
2018	The Meeting	Nathaniel Burns	Chichester Festival Theatre	
2019	The End of History	Tom	Royal Court Theatre	
2022	Jack Absolute Flies Again	Jack Absolute	National Theatre	Main role
