= Charlotte Bray =

British composer (born 1982)

Charlotte Bray (born 1982) is a British composer. Her work has been performed by The Royal Opera, London Sinfonietta, Birmingham Contemporary Music Group, and BBC Symphony Orchestra.

== Biography ==
Charlotte Bray was born in 1982 and raised in High Wycombe. She studied cello and composition at the Royal Birmingham Conservatoire, graduating with First Class Honours having studied with Andrew Downes and Joe Cutler. She then completed a Master of Music with Distinction in composition at the Royal College of Music, where she studied with Mark-Anthony Turnage. She participated in the Britten–Pears Contemporary Composition Course in 2007 with Oliver Knussen, Colin Matthews, and Magnus Lindberg and studied at Tanglewood Music Center in 2008. In 2011, Bray was made an honorary member of Birmingham Conservatoire and in 2014 was named their Alumni of the Year in the field of Excellence in Sport or the Arts. She was awarded the Royal Philharmonic Society Composition Prize in 2010, resulting in a piano quartet commission for Cheltenham Music Festival for which she wrote Replay. She was also winner of the 2014 Lili Boulanger Memorial Fund Prize.

Bray was appointed Birmingham Contemporary Music Group/Sound and Music Apprentice Composer-in-Residence for 2009/10, during which time violinist Alexandra Wood and the BCMG premiered her violin concerto Caught in Treetops under conductor Oliver Knussen. Her orchestral work Beyond a Fallen Tree (a UBS Soundscapes: Pioneers commission)was performed by the London Symphony Orchestra under Daniel Harding on 23 May 2010. Her song cycle Verre de Venise (for tenor, piano, and string quartet), was co-commissioned by the Aldeburgh, Aix-en-Provence, and Verbier Festivals in 2010. Her Scenes from Wonderland was commissioned by the London Philharmonic Orchestra for soloist Jennifer Pike and violinists from London Music Masters in 2011. As inaugural Composer-in-Residence at the Oxford Lieder Festival 2011, Bray composed a baritone song cycle for Roderick Williams.

In July 2012, At the Speed of Stillness premiered, a BBC Proms commission, with Mark Elder conducting the Aldeburgh World Orchestra. In the same year, Invisible Cities was commissioned by the Verbier Festival and performed by Lawrence Power and Julien Quentin; as well as Making Arrangements, a chamber opera written for Tête à Tête Opera Festival.

In 2015, Bray's chamber opera Entanglement was premiered by the Nova Music Opera. Bray collaborated with librettist Amy Rosenthal on the story of Ruth Ellis, the last woman to be hanged in Britain. Also premiered in 2015 were Out of the Ruins (commissioned by The Royal Opera for their youth company, mezzo-soprano, and orchestra) and Come Away for the Chester Cathedral Choir. Falling in the Fire was premiered in 2016, written for cellist Guy Johnston.

Bray has written for the London Symphony Orchestra, London Philharmonic Orchestra, Birmingham Contemporary Music Group, City of Birmingham Symphony Orchestra, Ensemble 360, Britten Sinfonia, London Sinfonietta, Dover Quartet, Jennifer Pike, Lawrence Power, Huw Watkins, Samantha Crawford, and Mona Asuka Ott. She has also composed for the BBC Proms, Aldeburgh Festival, Cheltenham Music Festival, Aix-en-Provence Festival, and Verbier Festival. Her work has been conducted by Mark Elder, Oliver Knussen, Daniel Harding, and Jac van Steen.

She was in residence at the MacDowell program in the summer of 2013 and then at the Liguria Study Centre, having been awarded a Bogliasco Foundation Fellowship.

== Selected works ==
=== Orchestra or large ensemble ===
- A Dark Doorway (2024)
- Stone Dancer (2016), orchestra
- Falling in the Fire (2015), solo cello and orchestra
- Fanfare for Birmingham (2014), ensemble of 8 players
- Black Rainbow (2013), orchestra
- At the Speed of Stillness (2012), orchestra
- Scenes from Wonderland (2011), solo violin and orchestra
- Caught in Treetops (2010), solo violin and large ensemble

=== Chamber ===
- Renga Miniatures (2007), flute, clarinet, horn, piano, violin, cello
- Trail of Light (2008), flute and viola/cello
- Three Rhapsodies (2009), clarinet quintet
- Throw Back (2009), saxophone quartet
- Midnight Interludes (2010), clarinet and cello
- Invisible Cities (2011), viola and piano
- Replay (2011), piano, violin, viola, cello
- The Sun Was Chasing Venus (2012), string quintet
- Secret (2012), flute duet
- The Barred Owl (2013), piano duet
- Circling Point (2014), alto saxophone and piano
- Those Secret Eyes (2014), piano trio
- That Crazed Smile (2014, piano trio
- Here Everything Shines (2015), flute and guitar
- Perseus (2015), cello and piano

=== Solo ===
- On the Other Shore (2014), cello
- Beyond (2013), violin
- Oneiroi (2013), piano
- Suya Dalmak (2013), cello and tape
- Off the Rails (2006), piano
- All at Sea (2012), piano
- Chapter One (2012), piano
- Passing Shadows (2012), guitar
- Late Snow (2009), oboe
- Elegy for George (2006), viola

=== Vocal ===
- Midnight Closes (2010), soprano, piano, clarinet, cello
- Verre de Venise (2010), tenor, piano, string quartet
- Sonnets and Love Songs (2011), baritone, piano
- Yellow Leaves (2012), soprano, piano
- Fire Burning in Snow (2013) mezzo-soprano, oboe/English horn, B-flat clarinet/bass clarinet, violin, cello
- Crossing Faultlines (2021)

=== Opera and stage ===
- The Fox and the Crow (2011), soprano, baritone, harp, cello
- Making Arrangements (2012), soprano, mezzo-soprano, tenor, baritone, flute, English horn, harp, violin, cello, double bass
- Out of the Ruins (2014), youth chorus, mezzo-soprano, orchestra
- Entanglement (2015), soprano, tenor, baritone, flute, clarinet/bass clarinet, percussion, violin, cello, double bass
- American Mother (2025), soprano, mezzo-soprano, tenor, baritone, bass, chorus, orchestra

=== Choral ===
- Walking with my Iguana (2007), choir and piano
- On the Green (2013), two-part choir and piano
- John, Tom, and James (2013), two-part choir and piano
- Come Away (2014), a cappella SATB choir
- Agnus Dei (2014), a cappella SSATTB choir
