= Diana and I =

2017 British TV programme

- Screenplay by: Jeremy Brock
- Directed by: Peter Cattaneo
- Starring: Charlotte Hope; Tamsin Greig; Tuppence Middleton; Laurie Davidson; Gemma Jones; Nico Mirallegro; Neil Morrissey
- Composer: James Lavino
- Country of origin: United Kingdom
- Original language: English

Production
- Executive producers: Luke Aiken; Kenton Allen; Jeremy Brock; Simon Curtis; Matthew Justice; Elizabeth Kilgarriff
- Producer: Karen Lewis
- Cinematography: Ben Smithard
- Editor: Paul Knight
- Running time: 90 minutes
- Production companies: Big Talk Productions; British Broadcasting Corporation

Original release
- Network: BBC Two
- Release: 4 September 2017

Diana and I is a British made-for-television film that explores how the death of Diana, Princess of Wales, affected ordinary people. Written by Jeremy Brock and directed by Peter Cattaneo, it tells the stories of four people, and how they react to the news of the Princess's death, following their lives from when the news broke on 31 August 1997 to Diana's funeral on 6 September 1997. The film aired on BBC Two in the UK on 4 September 2017.

== Cast ==
- Charlotte Hope – Sophie Lewis
- Tamsin Greig – Mary McDonald
- Tuppence Middleton – Laura Phillips
- Laurie Davidson – Michael Lewis
- Gemma Jones – Mrs. McDonald
- Nico Mirallegro – Jack Taylor
- Neil Morrissey – Colin Taylor
- Ben Abell – Mechanic
- Zoe Aldrich – Anne
- Lisa Allen – Karaoke woman
- Kelva Barrett – Debt collector
- Kingsley Ben-Adir – Russell
- Rosalind Carn – Hotel receptionist
- Laurie Davidson – Michael Lewis
- Elly Fairman – Julie
- John Gordon Sinclair – Gordon
- Joanne James – Mourner in the park
- Gemma Lawman – Karaoke woman
- Jassem Mougari – Kitchen porter
- Bola Okuh – David
- Kiran Sonia Sawar – Yasmin
- Roshan Seth – Uncle Zaheer
