= Charity Taylor =

English physician and prison administrator (1914–1998)

- Born: May Doris Charity Clifford; Woking
- Died: 4 January 1998 (aged 83)
- Spouse: Stephen Taylor, Baron Taylor (m. 1939; died 1988)

May Doris Charity Taylor, Baroness Taylor (née Clifford; 16 September 1914 – 4 January 1998) was an English physician and prison administrator who became the first woman prison governor in England.

Taylor was born on 16 September 1914, in Woking, and studied medicine at the Royal Free Hospital. She was appointed assistant medical officer at Holloway Prison in 1942, later becoming medical officer, before becoming governor in 1945. In 1955, she was governor during the imprisonment and hanging of Ruth Ellis.

== Personal life ==
In 1939, she married the physician/politician Stephen Taylor, who later became the Labour/SDP life peer Baron Taylor.

== In popular culture ==
She was played by Jean Rimmer in the 1980 drama Lady Killers. She was played by Juliet Stevenson in the 2025 drama A Cruel Love.
