= USB drive =

USB drive may refer to:

- A USB flash drive or "thumb drive", a USB-connected computer storage using semiconductor non-volatile memory
- A USB external drive, a hard drive fitted with a USB interface
  - Secure Digital, a non-volatile memory card format
  - CompactFlash, a flash memory mass storage device
  - Memory Stick, a removable flash memory card format
