= Alexandra Wood (violinist) =

British violinist

Alexandra Wood (born 1977) is a violinist from Cookham, England. She began playing at 3 years old, gaining 140 marks for her grade VIII Associated Board of the Royal Schools of Music examination at the age of 10. At age 13, she gave her first concerto performance and joined the National Youth Orchestra of Great Britain; she would go on to lead the same orchestra in her mid-teens.

In 2000, Wood graduated from Selwyn College, Cambridge with a double first with distinction. She then went to the Royal College of Music in London, studying with Izhak Rashkovsky, and was awarded the President Emerita Scholarship. Upon graduation she was awarded the Mills Williams and Phoebe Benham Junior fellowships.

She has won major prizes at international violin competitions, including the Henryk Wieniawski Violin Competition, Tibor Varga, Rodolfo Lipizer and Yampolsky. Wood was the winner of the Worshipful Company of Musicians Medal in 2000.

== Career ==
Wood is Creative Director and leader of City of London Sinfonia and a frequent leader of the Birmingham Contemporary Music Group. She also regularly guest-leads other ensembles, including the London Sinfonietta and Aurora Orchestra. She is a frequent duo partner with Huw Watkins whom she met at university. She is a member of Contemporary Consort, a small ensemble that specialises in British music dating from 1900 to the present.

In 2009, she released a CD of world premiere recordings: Chimera. The same year, Wood premiered a new violin concerto written for her by Hugh Wood (no relation).

In 2011, Wood premiered a violin concerto “Caught in Treetops” by Charlotte Bray at the Aldeburgh Festival.

In 2013, Wood accepted the position of Leader of City of London Sinfonia and was named Creative Director in 2017.

Wood plays a violin made by Nicolo Gagliano in 1767.
