= Chester Cathedral Choir =

Resident choir of Chester Cathedral in England

Chester Cathedral Choir is the resident choir of Chester Cathedral, Cheshire, England. In common with most British cathedral choirs, the choir sings evensong daily during term time.

== Composition ==
The Lay Clerks (alto, tenor and bass) sing both with the boys and the girls. In common with many other British cathedral choirs, the choir sings every day during the week and weekends (except for Wednesdays) together with a busy schedule of broadcasts, tours, recordings and concerts. There is also a mixed-voice adult choir - the Nave Choir (the longest-running cathedral voluntary choir in the country) - which is directed by the Assistant Director of Music, and sings a service of Compline regularly on Sunday evenings during term time.

Since 1997 the cathedral choir has recruited girl as well as boy trebles, both front rows singing regularly with the lay clerks. Occasionally, the girls and boys combine for special events.

The choir is directed and accompanied by Philip Rushforth (Director of Music), Benjamin Chewter (Assistant Director of Music) and Geoffrey Woollatt (Assistant Organist).

== Recording and broadcast ==
Notable recordings of the choir include: The Water of Life (2002); Love Eternal (2003); the Sing for Joy collection; and the Festival Evensong (2007). The choir also broadcasts regularly on BBC Radio 3 and Radio 4, and also recorded a concert for a broadcast on BBC Radio 2 during Christmas 2007. Their most recent recording is 'Glory to the New-Born King' (2012), which was released on the Priory label and attracted wide critical acclaim, notably in Gramophone magazine. In July 2012 the choir sang a live broadcast of Evensong on BBC Radio 3 as part of the Chester Festival; this included the first broadcast performance of The Chester Service by Francis Pott.

== Touring ==
Chester Cathedral Choir toured the United States for the first time in October 2007 and toured France in the summer of 2012 (performing in the cathedrals of Troyes and Albi, and the basilica of St-Sernin, Toulouse).

== See also ==
- Chester Cathedral Choir School
