= Ava Wong Davies =

British playwright and screenwriter

Ava Wong Davies (born 1996) is a British playwright and screenwriter. Her debut play i will still be whole (when you rip me in half) premiered at the Bunker Theatre in 2019. She was shortlisted for the Verity Bargate Award, the Tony Craze Award and the Women's Prize for Playwriting for her 2020 play scum. Her play Graceland was performed at the Royal Court Theatre in March 2023.

Wong Davies was named one of Variety's 2025 Brits to Watch.

== Early life ==
Wong Davies was born in central London to a Cantonese-speaking Chinese mother and a Welsh father. She has maternal family in Singapore, Malaysia and Hong Kong.

== Career ==
Wong Davies' debut play was i will still be whole (when you rip me in half), which premiered at the Bunker Theatre in London on 12 November 2019. It follows a mother and daughter, played by Tuyen Do and Aoife Hinds respectively, who explore their strained relationship through a series of monologues. The script was described as having an "exactness", and using dark humour to capture the character of the daughter EJ. She has been a member of the Soho Theatre Writers Lab 18/19, the Bush Theatre Emerging Writers Group 19/20, and the Royal Court Writers Group 20/21.

In November 2020, Wong Davies' coming-of-age story Half Blue was released on Audible as part of GNR8T: Series 2, through a partnership with the London Academy of Music and Dramatic Art. Her play small hours was commissioned by the Oxford Playhouse and the IF Oxford Science and Ideas Festival and was performed by the Mandala Theatre Company in October 2020, directed by Yasmin Sidhwa over Zoom. In 2020, her play scum was shortlisted for the Verity Bargate Award, the Tony Craze Award and the Women's Prize for Playwriting. Her play Rime of the Second Sister was produced by 45North and starred Martina Laird, Alice Vilanculo, Witney White and Sky Yang.

Wong Davies wrote the play Graceland, which premiered at the Royal Court Theatre in March 2023. The play is performed as 75 minutes monologue, which follows a British-Chinese woman portrayed by Sabrina Wu who falls in love with a poet living off his family's money. It received mixed reviews. Wong Davies won the Ambassador Theatre Group Playwright's Prize for the play.

Wong Davies served as Consulting Producer on the third season of the HBO and BBC television drama series Industry.

As a theatre critic, Wong Davies writes for Exeunt Magazine, The Independent, The Stage, and gal-dem. She won the Sunday Times' Harold Hobson Award for theatre criticism in 2018.
