= Nigel Havers =

British actor and presenter (born 1951)

The Honourable Nigel Havers
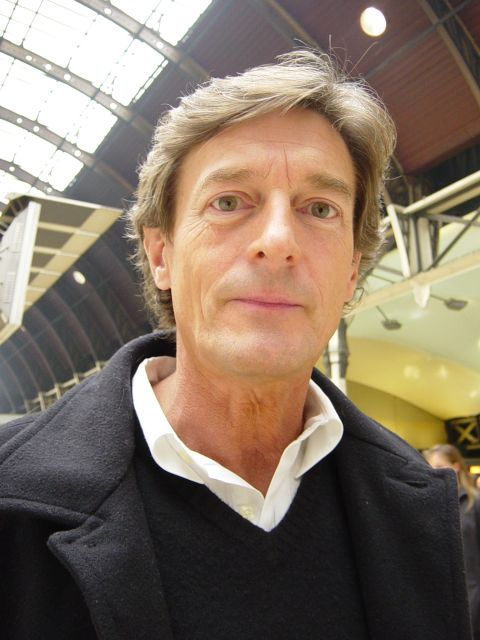
- Havers in 2004
- Born: Nigel Allan Havers; 6 November 1951 (age 74); Edmonton, Middlesex, England
- Occupations: Actor and presenter
- Years active: 1970–present
- Spouses: Carolyn Cox (m. 1974; div. 1989) Polly Williams (m. 1989; died 2004) Georgiana Bronfman (m. 2007)
- Children: 1
- Father: Michael Havers, Baron Havers

Nigel Allan Havers (born 6 November 1951) is an English actor and presenter. In 1981 he earned a BAFTA nomination for Best Actor in a Supporting Role, for portraying Lord Andrew Lindsay in the British sports film Chariots of Fire (1981). Other credits include A Passage to India (1984), Empire of the Sun (1987), Farewell to the King (1989), Don't Wait Up (1983–1990), Sleepers (1991) Coronation Street, (2009–2019), Brothers & Sisters (2009), Doctor Who spin-off The Sarah Jane Adventures, Downton Abbey (2011), The Life of Rock with Brian Pern (2014), Benidorm (2017), Finding Alice (2021), The Gentlemen (2024), and A Cruel Love: The Ruth Ellis Story (2025).

== Early life and family ==
Nigel Allan Havers was born on 6 November 1951, in Edmonton, Middlesex, the younger of two sons of barrister Sir Michael Havers (later Lord Havers) and Carol Lay. His father served as Attorney General for England and Wales and briefly as Lord Chancellor in the Conservative Government in the 1980s.

His paternal aunt, Lady Butler-Sloss, his grandfather Sir Cecil Havers and elder brother Philip Havers KC also had prominent legal careers. His paternal uncle, David Havers, was a Manchester-based businessman.

Havers took part in the BBC TV series Who Do You Think You Are?, broadcast in the UK in July 2013. As part of the show, he explored his ancestry from an Essex businessman on his father's side and a Cornish miller on his mother's side.

== Education ==
Havers was educated at Nowton Court Prep School in Bury St Edmunds, Suffolk and is an alumnus and patron of Arts Educational School (ArtsEd), an independent school for performing arts in Chiswick, London.

== Professional life and career ==
Havers is most known for "playing the quintessential, old school Englishman with his dashing good looks, cut-glass accent and thoroughly charming manner".

In 1975, Havers's career began with an appearance in Upstairs, Downstairs, in one of the show's last episodes, "Joke Over" as Peter Dinmont, one of Georgina's (Lesley-Anne Down) Roaring Twenties "party" friends. In 1975, Havers played the hapless heroin addict, Patrick Mills, who stood trial for a series of drug offences in the Granada Television daytime series Crown Court.

His first film appearance was in Pope Joan (1972), then in The Glittering Prizes (1976), but his first major success came with the leading role in a BBC dramatisation of Nicholas Nickleby (1977), closely followed by another BBC drama serial adaption of A Horseman Riding By (1978).

In 1981, he played a main role in the film Chariots of Fire (1981), for which, he earned a BAFTA nomination for Best Actor in a Supporting Role. He starred in A Passage to India (1984), he co-starred with Maureen Lipman in The Little Princess (1986), starred in Empire of the Sun (1987), and Farewell to the King (1989), he co-starred for several years alongside Dinah Sheridan and Tony Britton in the 1980s BBC sitcom Don't Wait Up (1983–1990). He co-starred with Warren Clarke in the BBC comedic mini-series Sleepers (1991).

Havers appeared on This Is Your Life in 1992, having been surprised by host Michael Aspel at Twickenham Film Studios. He later wrote an autobiography, titled Playing with Fire, which was published in October 2006 by Headline Publishing Group.

In 2009, Havers appeared in the U.S. television drama Brothers & Sisters, and the Doctor Who spin-off The Sarah Jane Adventures. On 18 December 2009, he first appeared in the British soap Coronation Street (broadcast on the ITV network) playing the charming escort Lewis Archer, who woos Audrey Roberts

In November 2010, Havers became a contestant on the tenth series of I'm A Celebrity... Get Me Out of Here!, which started on 14 November 2010. On 21 November, Havers left the show after vehemently objecting to a challenge called Kangaroo Court in which contestants who lost the challenge would be subjected to an electric shock.

As a guest star in the 2011 Christmas Special episode of television show Downton Abbey, Havers portrayed Lord Hepworth, a charming and hopeful suitor of wealthy Lady Rosamund Painswick, the widowed sister of the Earl of Grantham, played by Samantha Bond.

In July 2012, Havers presented a programme on ITV called The Real Chariots of Fire, a documentary about the runners who inspired the film Chariots of Fire. In 2014, he played Tony Pebble in The Life of Rock with Brian Pern, a BBC Four comedy which parodied the life and career of former Genesis singer, Peter Gabriel. On 25 January 2015, Havers took part in celebrity talent show Get Your Act Together.

Havers appeared in the ninth series of the sitcom Benidorm (2017), returning as the same character for the tenth series in 2018. He also joined fellow celebrities Simon Callow, Lorraine Chase, and Debbie McGee on the Channel 5 (UK) show, Celebrity Carry On Barging, later that year.

In 2020, he starred as Roger alongside Keeley Hawes and Joanna Lumley in the comedy drama series Finding Alice. In 2024, he starred as Lord Whitecroft in 2 episodes of Guy Ritchie's Netflix crime comedy series The Gentlemen.

In March 2025, Havers appeared in the four-part ITV series A Cruel Love: The Ruth Ellis Story as his own grandfather the judge Sir Cecil Havers.

== Personal life ==
Havers married Carolyn Cox in 1974. They had a daughter and divorced in 1989.

During his first marriage, Havers began a relationship with Polly Bloomfield (née) Williams, the daughter of actor Hugh Williams and the sister of his friend, actor Simon Williams. They married in 1989. She died in June 2004 of ovarian cancer.

In 1990, Havers was banned from driving for one year and fined £500 for drunk driving.

On 8 June 2007, Havers married Georgiana "George" Bronfman (née Rita Webb), an Essex native, in New York City. Bronfman is the former spouse of Canadian-American businessman Edgar Bronfman.

Havers is the godfather of comedian Jack Whitehall.

== Selected filmography ==
=== Film ===
Year	Title	Role	Notes
1972	Pope Joan	Young Monk	
1977	The Haunting of Julia	Estate Agent	
1978	Who Is Killing the Great Chefs of Europe?	Counterman	
1979	Birth of the Beatles	George Martin	
1981	Chariots of Fire	Lord Andrew Lindsay	Nominated – BAFTA Award for Best Actor in a Supporting Role
1984	A Passage to India	Ronny	
1985	Burke & Wills	William John Wills	
1986	The Whistle Blower	Bob Jones	
1987	Empire of the Sun	Dr. Rawlins	
1989	Farewell to the King	Capt. Fairbourne	
1990	Quiet Days in Clichy	Alfred Perlès	
1996	Element of Doubt	Richard	
2004	The Life and Death of Peter Sellers	David Niven	
2006	Penelope	Mr. Vanderman	

=== Television ===
Year	Title	Role	Notes
1973	Shabby Tiger	Toby Scriven	Episode: "A Wife in Water Colours"
1973	Crown Court	Bernard Crittenden	Episode: "Wise Child"
1974	The Black Arrow	Roger	4 episodes
1975	Upstairs, Downstairs	Peter Dimont	Episode: "Joke Over"
1975	Edward the Seventh	Frederick Crichton	2 episodes
1975	Crown Court	Patrick Mills	Episode: "Never on Sundays"
1975	Thriller	Ludovic Bates	Episode: "The Next Voice You See"
1976	The Glittering Prizes	Denis Porson	3 episodes
1976	The Cedar Tree	Rex Burton-Smith	2 episodes
1977	Nicholas Nickleby	Nicholas Nickleby	Lead role; all 6 episodes
1978	Pennies from Heaven	Conrad Baker	Episode: "Down Sunnyside Lane"
1978	An Englishman's Castle	Mark Ingram	3 episodes
1978	A Horseman Riding By	Paul Craddock	12 episodes
1979	Birth of the Beatles	George Martin	Television film
1979	Rumpole of the Bailey	Ronald Ransom	Episode: "Rumpole and the Course of True Love"
1981	Winston Churchill: The Wilderness Years	Randolph Churchill	All 8 episodes
1981	Tales of the Unexpected	Miller	Episode: "Would You Believe It?"
1982	Nancy Astor	Bobby Shaw	4 episodes
1983–1990	Don't Wait Up	Dr. Tom Latimer	All 39 episodes
1984	Strangers and Brothers	Roy Calvert	4 episodes
1985	Star Quality: Bon Voyage	Roddy Buchanan	
1985	A Different Kind of Love	Clement	
1986	Lord Elgin and Some Stones of No Value	Lord Elgin / Tim	
1987	A Little Princess	Carrisford	4 episodes
1987	The Death of the Heart	Thomas Quayne	
1987	Hold the Dream	Jim Fairley	Episode #1.1
1987	The Charmer	Ralph Ernest Gorse	All 6 episodes
1989	Naked Under Capricorn	Davy Marriner	
1990	A Bit of Fry and Laurie	Himself	Episode #2.6
1991	The Private War of Lucinda Smith	Edward	
1991	A Slight Hitch	Simon	
1991	Sleepers	Jeremy Coward/ Sergei Rublev	4 episodes
1991	A Perfect Hero	Hugh Fleming	All 6 episodes
1992–1993	The Good Guys	Guy McFadyean	All 16 episodes
1994	Red Eagle	Peter Husak	
1994	The Burning Season: The Chico Mendes Story	Steven Kaye	
1994	Woof!	Appleby	Episode: "Mr. Wonderful"
1995	The Glass Virgin	Edmund Lagrange	2 episodes
1995	Chiller	Oliver Halkin	Episode: "Prophecy"
1995	Liz: The Elizabeth Taylor Story	Michael Wilding	
1996	Murder Most Horrid	Harvey Stafford	Episode: "Girl Friday"
1996	Strangers	Philip	Episode: "Touch"
1997	Bridge of Time	Halek	
1997	The Heart Surgeon	Dr. Alex Marsden	
1995–1999	Dangerfield	Dr. Jonathan Paige	26 episodes
2001	The Gentleman Thief	A J Raffles	
2001	The Armando Iannucci Shows	Ivy Waiter	Episode: "Mortality"
2002–2003	Manchild	Terry	15 episodes
2002	Murder in Mind	Nicholas Chadwick QC	Episode: "Flashback"
2004–2005	Little Britain	Leader of the Opposition	2 episodes
2005	Born and Bred	Henry Williamson	3 episodes
2006	Open Wide	Peter Hillman	
2009–2010	Brothers & Sisters	Roger Grant	6 episodes
2009–2011	Lunch Monkeys	Mike	12 episodes
2009	The Sarah Jane Adventures	Peter Dalton	2 episodes
2009–2010, 2012–2013, 2018–2019	Coronation Street	Lewis Archer	Series regular, 182 episodes
2011	Downton Abbey	Lord Hepworth	Episode: "Christmas at Downton Abbey"
2010	I'm a Celebrity...Get Me Out of Here! (British series 10)	Himself	Withdrew on Day 9
2014–2017	The Life of Rock with Brian Pern	Tony Pebblé	9 episodes
2016	Comedy Playhouse	David	Episode: "Stop/Start"
2017–2018	Benidorm	Stanley Keen	3 episodes
2017	Tracey Ullman's Show	Sir Richard Appleworth	Episode #2.4
2017	Brian Pern: A Tribute	Tony Pebblé	
2017	Celebrity Carry on Barging	Himself	
2017	Timewasters	Dr. Eugene Braithwaite	Episode: "Good Kids, M.D.A City"
2017	Better Things	Lester	Episode: "White Rock"
2017	Murder on the Blackpool Express	Doc	
2019	The Cockfields	Larry	TV Mini-Series, 2 episodes
2019	Midsomer Murders	Andrew Wilder	S21E1: "The Point of Balance"
2019	Posh Hotels	Himself	4 episodes
2020	All Creatures Great and Small	General Ransom	Episode: "Andante"
2020-2025	The Bidding Room	Himself as host	BBC TV Series 1-7 (25-30 Episodes each)
2021	Finding Alice	Roger	TV series, 6 episodes
2024	The Gentlemen	Lord "Tibsy" Whitecroft	Netflix Series, 2 episodes
2024	Sandringham: A Royal Residence with Nigel Havers	Himself as presenter	Channel 5 three-part series
2025	A Cruel Love: The Ruth Ellis Story	Judge Cecil Havers	
2025	Play for Today	Frank	Episode: "Never Too Late"

=== Theatre (pantomime) ===
- Sleeping Beauty – London Palladium (2025), as Keeper of the Privy
- Robin Hood – London Palladium (2024)
- Peter Pan – London Palladium (2023)
- Jack and the Beanstalk - London Palladium (2022)
- Pantoland – London Palladium (2021)
- Goldilocks and the Three Bears – London Palladium (2019)
- Snow White – London Palladium (2018)
- Dick Whittington – London Palladium (2017)
- Jack and the Beanstalk – Theatre Royal Bath (2016)
- Dick Whittington – Swindon Wyvern Theatre (2014)
- Robin Hood – Theatre Royal, Plymouth (2013)
- Jack and the Beanstalk – The Mayflower (2012)
- Peter Pan – Hawth Theatre (2011)
- Dick Whittington – Birmingham Hippodrome (2010–2011)
- Jack and the Beanstalk – Nottingham Theatre Royal (2009)
- Aladdin – Yvonne Arnaud Theatre (2008)
- Cinderella – Richmond Theatre (2007)

=== Theatre (other) ===
- Ricochet (1993) as producer and lead actor
- Rebecca (2011) as lead actor
- The Importance of Being Earnest – Harold Pinter Theatre (2014)
- The Importance of Being Earnest – Theatre Royal, Glasgow (2015)
- Art (2018) as lead actor
- Private Lives (2021–23) as lead actor

=== Radio ===
- Proof by Dick Francis (1987) as Tony Beach
- Reluctant Persuaders (2015) as Rupert Hardacre

=== Audiobooks ===
- The Scarifyers: The Secret Weapon of Doom (2010) as Victor Bright
- Doctor Who: No More Lies (2007) as Nick
- Tales from Watership Down (Richard Adams) (1996)

== Awards and nominations ==
Year	Award	Category	Result	Ref.
1982	BAFTA Awards	Best Supporting Artist	Nominated	
1988	TV Times Awards	Best Actor	Won	
1990	British Style Awards	Best Style	Won	
2013	British Soap Awards	Best Exit	Won	
2013	British Soap Awards	Villain of the Year	Nominated	
2018	British Pantomime Awards	Best Supporting Male	Nominated	
2019	Inside Soap Awards	Best Exit	Longlisted	
