= Amy Rosenthal =

British playwright (born 1974)

Amelia Rosenthal (born 1974) is a British playwright from Muswell Hill, London. She is a recipient of The Sunday Times Drama Award.

== Biography ==
Rosenthal was born in 1974, the daughter of dramatist Jack Rosenthal and actress Maureen Lipman. She is Jewish.

Rosenthal studied to be a playwright at the University of Birmingham, where she took a master's degree in playwriting.

She won The Sunday Times Drama Award with her debut play Henna Night in 1999. In 2015, she wrote the libretto to the opera Entanglement by the composer Charlotte Bray. Rosenthal was shortlisted for the Susan Smith Blackburn Prize for female dramatists. Rosenthal teaches playwriting on the Arvon courses, and at Birkbeck College, University of London.

== Plays ==
Her plays include:

- Sitting Pretty (1998)
- Henna Night (1999) (winner of the Sunday Times Drama Award 1999)
- Jerusalem Syndrome (2000)
- Little Words (radio play)
- Jack Rosenthal's Last Act (4-part series adapted from book for BBC Radio 4)
- Thank God It's Friday (co-written with Cosh Omar 2007)
- On The Rocks (2008) (about D. H. Lawrence and his circle, shortlisted for the Susan Smith Blackburn Prize 2009)
- The Jitterbug Blitz (2009)
- The Workroom (adapted from L'Atelier by Jean-Claude Grumberg)
- Fear of Cherry Blossom (premiere at Cheltenham Everyman Studio Theatre, 2016)
