= Moses Raine =

British playwright

- Born: 7 August 1984 (age 42); Oxford, Oxfordshire, England
- Education: Dragon School; St Edward's School, Oxford
- Occupations: Playwright; screenwriter
- Parent(s): Craig Raine; Ann Pasternak Slater
- Relatives: Boris Pasternak (grand nephew)

Moses Raine (born 7 August 1984) is an English playwright and screenwriter. He was born in Oxford and is the son of the poet and critic Craig Raine and Ann Pasternak Slater; he is also the grandnephew of the Russian novelist Boris Pasternak. He attended the Dragon School and St. Edward's School in Oxford.

== Life and career ==
In 2004, he was shortlisted for the Verity Bargate Award for his collection of short plays, The Survival Handbook. His next play, Shrieks of Laughter, was commissioned as part of Soho Theatre's Writers' Attachment Programme and premiered at the Soho Theatre in 2006. In The Observer, Susannah Clapp wrote, of both:

"Moses Raine wasn't born when Cheek by Jowl was founded, but he's already written a spellbinding clutch of plays: they are like no one else's."

In May 2014 Raine's Donkey Heart premiered at the Old Red Lion Theater, Islington.

This work was praised by David Benedict in Variety (19 May 2014) as "consistently surprising ... highly entertaining ... The energy and warmth of this unexpected winner deserve far wider attention and exposure."

Moses Raine is currently working on a film adaptation of Ian McEwan's short story, "Conversation with a Cupboard Man".
