= Murder Most Horrid =

- Title screen
- Genre: Black comedy Crime
- Created by: Paul Smith
- Developed by: Talkback Productions
- Written by: Various
- Starring: Dawn French
- Theme music composer: Simon Brint; Simon Wallace
- Country of origin: United Kingdom
- Original language: English
- No. of series: 4
- No. of episodes: 24

Production
- Executive producer: Peter Fincham
- Producers: Sophie Clarke-Jervoise; Jon Plowman
- Production locations: London, England
- Editors: Geoff Hogg; Michael John Bateman
- Running time: 30 minutes

Original release
- Network: BBC Two
- Release: 14 November 1991 – 2 April 1999

Murder Most Horrid is a British black comedy anthology series starring Dawn French. It was broadcast on BBC Two for four series runs, in 1991, 1994, 1996 and 1999.

Created by Paul Smith, who also co-created Colin's Sandwich (with Terry Kyan, as noted below) and has written for The Brittas Empire, among other programmes, the series starred French as a different character in each episode. Many episodes were directed by Bob Spiers, who also worked with French on The Comic Strip Presents... and French and Saunders.

== Format ==
Most episodes parodied the thriller and murder mystery genres with one episode lampooning the trials and tribulations of being a children's presenter in general, and Blue Peter in particular. In 1998, this episode ("Murder at Tea Time") was repeated to celebrate the 40th anniversary of Blue Peter, as part of a section entitled "Spoof Peter", which also featured (among others) the Python skit "How to Do It".

Each episode was stand-alone, and the episodes were written by different writers or writing teams with several contributing multiple episodes across the four series. Among these writers, the pairing of series-creator Paul Smith with Terry Kyan (who had previously collaborated on Not the Nine O'Clock News and Alas Smith and Jones) is particularly notable. The two would subsequently create and write Bonjour la Classe, starring Nigel Planer.

Other series writers included Private Eye editor and Have I Got News For You stalwart Ian Hislop, Press Gang creator and Doctor Who showrunner Steven Moffat, award-winning children's author Anthony Horowitz, Nick Newman and John O'Farrell.

Episodes in series 1 mostly opened with French selecting and reading from a book, usually a quotation actually or allegedly from Shakespeare; series 2 onward dropped this opening. The series' theme song, which featured at the end of the episode, was sung by Ruby Turner. The lyrics changed between episodes, the penultimate line always a word rhyming with "horrid", sometimes humorously forced. The murders ranged from the straightforward to the bizarre, with the murder weapon shown on a pedestal during the end credits.

== Episodes ==
=== Series 1 (1991) ===
No. overall	No. in series	Title	Directed by	Written by	Original release date
1	1	"The Case of the Missing"	Bob Spiers	Ian Hislop & Nick Newman	14 November 1991
WPC Diane Softly (French) is suddenly put in charge of a seemingly straightforward murder case, which gradually becomes more complex and mysterious. Guest cast: John Boswall as Judge, Paul Mark Elliott as Max Rammell, Stephen Frost as Sgt. Dawkins, Gary Love as Constable Williams, Timothy Spall as Pathologist, Geoffrey McGivern as Mason, Bill Paterson as Chief Inspector
2	2	"The Girl from Ipanema"	Bob Spiers	Terry Kyan & Paul Smith	21 November 1991
When housekeeper Maria (French) arrives at the house of MP Howling and his wife Lydia, she doesn't quite find things the way she expected. But one day, Maria witnesses a violent attack on Lydia by her husband and things start to take a turn for the better. Guest cast: Marsha Fitzalan as Lydia's friend, James Cossins as Sir Hugh Lotterby, Jane Asher as Lydia Howling, Jacey Sallés as Silvia, Martin Jarvis as Maurice Howling, Christopher Good as Leonard
3	3	"He Died a Death"	Bob Spiers	Nick Newman & Ian Hislop	28 November 1991
Backstage at a London theatre, rivalry turns into suspicion when one of the cast is murdered during a performance. With French as Judy Talent, an actress in a play. Guest cast: Kevin McNally as Inspector Turner, Stephen Moore as Basil Hampton, Kevin Allen as Simon Pleasance, Kenneth Cranham as Inspector Salford, Ben Miller as PC Watkins, Robin Driscoll as Reg, Gwen Taylor as Beryl, Tony Slattery as Tony Sparkle, Harriet Thorpe as Sarah Deveraux, Greg Cruttwell as Timmy Duval, Togo Igawa as Japanese tourist
4	4	"A Determined Woman"	James Hendrie	James Hendrie	5 December 1991
Scientist Rita Proops (French) brings her equipment home to start working on the ultimate invention — the time machine. But this causes friction at home with disastrous results. Guest cast: Michael Sharvell-Martin as Judge, Soo Drouet as Porter, Caroline Blakiston as Dr Rachel Vine, Kathy Burke as Helen, Jim Broadbent as Selwyn Proops
5	5	"Murder at Tea Time"	Bob Spiers	Jez Alborough & Graham Alborough	12 December 1991
Bunty Bresslaw (French) is a successful children's television presenter, an expert in sticky-back plastic and a favourite with the young viewers of Write Away. However, when her younger co-presenter is asked to pose for a wax modelling session at Madame Tussauds, jealousy arises off camera, and Bunty decides to put her young rival in his place. Guest cast: Jane Booker as Sally, Geraldine McNulty (Mandi), Rebecca Stevens (Lizzie), Andy Parsons as Charlie, David Harewood as Jonathon, Dexter Fletcher as Colin, Marco Williamson as Donald
6	6	"Mrs Hat and Mrs Red"	Bob Spiers	Dawn French & Ian Brown & James Hendrie	19 December 1991
Mrs Hat is shocked when she bumps into her doppelgänger, and ends up following her home. She finds herself literally stepping into her shoes and taking over her luxurious lifestyle. Both Katie Hatcliffe and Sonya Redfern are played by French. Guest cast: Robert Llewellyn as Taxi Driver, Jim Carter as Roy Redfern, Kate McEnery as Jemima Redfern, Ricco Ross as Gary, Geoffrey McGivern as Guy, Beresford Le Roy as Supermarket Manager, Claire Cathcart as Cashier, Brian McCardie as Supermarket Assistant, Mia Soteriou as Pianist, Susie Fairfax as Friend, Harriet Thorpe as Friend, Matilda Thorpe as Friend, Francesca Brill as Jemima's Friend

=== Series 2 (1994) ===
No. overall	No. in series	Title	Directed by	Written by	Original release date
7	1	"Overkill"	Bob Spiers	Steven Moffat	3 March 1994
French as Tina Mellish, social worker turned reluctant assassin; also features Emma Amos, Amanda Donohoe, Colin Salmon, Peter Vaughan and Geoffrey McGivern
8	2	"Lady Luck"	Bob Spiers	Terry Kyan & Paul Smith	10 March 1994
French as Denise Cunningham, hairdresser; also features Ann Bryson and Sean Gallagher
9	3	"A Severe Case of Death"	Marcus Mortimer	Chris England	17 March 1994
French as Maud Jenkins/'Dr Adams', Victorian maid turned cross-dressing doctor; also features Lucy Benjamin, John Fortune, Timothy West, James Saxon, Georgina Hale, David Gooderson, Brian Hibbard and Roy Evans
10	4	"We All Hate Granny"	Dewi Humphreys	James Hendrie	24 March 1994
French as Lily Gibbs, grandmother; also features James Fleet and Victoria Wicks
11	5	"Mangez Merveillac"	Bob Spiers	Ian Hislop & Nick Newman	31 March 1994
French as Verity Hodge, travel and cookery writer; also features Jane Booker, Philip Jackson, Kevin McNally and Clarke Peters
12	6	"Smashing Bird"	Dewi Humphreys	Jon Canter	7 April 1994
French as Vikky, nightclub singer; also features David Bamber, Hywel Bennett, Philip Martin Brown, Mark McGann and Ray Winstone

=== Series 3 (1996) ===
No. overall	No. in series	Title	Directed by	Written by	Original release date
13	1	"Girl Friday"	Dewi Humphreys	Paul Smith	10 May 1996
French as Sally Fairfax, P.A.; also features Nigel Havers and Geraldine McNulty
14	2	"A Life or Death Operation"	Dewi Humphreys	Mark Burton & John O'Farrell	17 May 1996
French as Kate Marshall, surgeon and TV presenter; also features John Bird and Brigit Forsyth
15	3	"Dying Live"	Dewi Humphries	Steven Moffat	24 May 1996
French as Daisy Talwinning, sacked abattoir worker; also features Jim Carter, Helen Lederer, John Thomson, Marcus D'Amico, and Jonathan Coy
16	4	"The Body Politic"	Ferdinand Fairfax	Anthony Horowitz	31 May 1996
French as Linda Bryce, schoolteacher and wife of the Leader of the Opposition; also features Hugh Laurie and John Bennett
17	5	"Confess"	Coky Giedroyc	Jon Canter	7 June 1996
French as Wendy Hodge, police sergeant; also features Minnie Driver, Roger Lloyd-Pack and Clive Russell
18	6	"Dead on Time"	Ferdinand Fairfax	Ian Hislop & Nick Newman	14 June 1996
French as The Grim Reaper; also features Sophie Okonedo, Danny Webb and Brian Capron

=== Series 4 (1999) ===
No. overall	No. in series	Title	Directed by	Written by	Original release date	Viewers (millions)
19	1	"Frozen"	Coky Giedroyc	Nick Vivian	19 February 1999	5.50
French as Lily Wood-Newton, churchgoer and pillar of the community; also features David Battley and Joanna Scanlan
20	2	"Going Solo"	Tony Dow	Paul Smith	26 February 1999	4.02
French as Tracey Phillips, yachtswoman; also features Jim Carter, Liam Hess and Sarah Lancashire
21	3	"Whoopi Stone"	Coky Giedroyc	Jon Canter	5 March 1999	3.96
French as Barbara Greaves/Whoopi Stone, police constable turned 'Queen of New York'; also features Jamie Foreman and Will Barton
22	4	"Confessions of a Murderer"	Edgar Wright	Ian Hislop & Nick Newman	19 March 1999	3.40
French as Harriet Snellgrove, serial confessor and nuisance; also features Hugh Bonneville, Graeme Garden and Philip Jackson
23	5	"Elvis, Jesus and Zack"	Tony Dow	Steven Moffat	26 March 1999	2.82
French as Jill Tanner, head of the Obituaries Department at Broadcast One; also features Sean Hughes, Janette Krankie, Chris Langham, Paul Reynolds, Nick Stringer, Pip Torrens and Jake Wood
24	6	"Dinner at Tiffany's"	Dewi Humphreys	Jonathan Harvey	2 April 1999	3.26
Tiffany Drapes, school dinner lady; also features Frances Barber as Gloria Twigge, a glamorous, selfish, alcoholic, spoilt Head Teacher; Thelma Barlow, Geraldine McNulty and Peter Serafinowicz

== Reception ==
Reviewing the DVD release, Empire wrote: "Dawn French's first solo effort has been eclipsed by the wider success of her Vicar of Dibley, and of comedy partner Jennifer Saunders' Ab Fab. But this arguably sees French on her best form".

=== Awards ===
- Murder Most Horrid won the 1994 British Comedy Award for Best TV Comedy Drama

== Home media ==
=== VHS ===
Two videos of the series were released by the BBC in 1996, through BBC Worldwide/Talkback (the former of which became 2 | entertain). Both were released on 3 June 1996, the first containing three episodes from series one and the second, three episodes from series two. These two series were not repeated on British television as often as the later series and, as a result, episodes not featured on the videos released by the BBC (The Case of the Missing, He Died A Death, Mrs Hat and Mrs Red, A Severe Case of Death, We All Hate Granny and Smashing Bird) have proven fairly difficult to view.

- Murder Most Horrid: The Girl from Ipanema/A Determined Woman/Murder at Tea Time (BBCV5854) EAN: 5032680800767
- Murder Most Horrid: Overkill/Lady Luck/Mangez Merveillac (BBCV5855) EAN: 5014503585525

=== DVD (Region 2) ===
- Murder Most Horrid: Volume 1 was released by FremantleMedia on 10 March 2008. The second series was released on 10 September 2012, with the third on 8 April 2013 and the fourth being 28 October 2013.
- Murder Most Horrid: The Complete Collection was released 18 November 2013 by FremantleMedia.

=== Streaming ===
As of November 2023, the first two series of the show are currently available to stream in the United States through Freevee, and in the United Kingdom through BritBox.
