= Out All Night =

Out All Night may refer to:

- Out All Night (TV series), American sitcom
- Out All Night (1927 film), American film
- Out All Night (1933 film), American comedy film
- "Out All Night" (Don't Wait Up), a 1983 television episode
