= Alice season 1 =

Alice
- Season 1
- No. of episodes: 24

Release
- Original network: CBS
- Original release: August 31, 1976 – March 26, 1977

Season chronology
- Next → Season 2

This is a list of episodes for the first season of the CBS-TV series Alice.

== Broadcast history ==
The first episode originally aired Tuesday, August 31, 1976, at 9:30-10:00 pm (EST). The rest of the season aired Wednesdays at 9:30–10:00 pm (EST) from September 29 to October 27, 1976 and Saturdays at 9:30–10:00 pm (EST) from November 6, 1976 to March 26, 1977.

== Episodes ==
No. overall	No. in season	Title	Directed by	Written by	Original release date	Prod. code
1	1	"Pilot"	Paul Bogart	Robert Getchell	August 31, 1976	000001
Recently widowed mother Alice Hyatt, who works as a waitress at Mel's Diner, hopes for a big break when a man claiming to be a talent agent (Dennis Dugan) arrives.
2	2	"Alice Gets a Pass"	Jim Drake	Martin Donovan	September 29, 1976	166552
A quarterback-turned-actor (Denny Miller) is set up on a date with Alice and takes a liking to Tommy, but he has a secret that threatens their new friendship.
3	3	"A Piece of the Rock"	Bill Persky	Ben Joelson & Art Baer	October 6, 1976	166551
Alice learns that her late husband named another woman as the beneficiary of his life insurance, then the woman pays her a visit.
4	4	"Pay the Fifty Dollars"	Bill Persky	Lloyd Garver	October 13, 1976	166556
Alice gets arrested for prostitution while singing at a nightclub. Guest starring Gordon Jump as Sheriff McElroy.
5	5	"A Call to Arms"	Jim Drake	Lloyd Garver	October 20, 1976	166554
Alice considers buying a gun when a heavy breather keeps calling her. Guest starring Jack Riley as Richard Atkins.
6	6	"The Last Review"	James Sheldon	Harvey Bullock & R.S. Allen	October 27, 1976	166557
Alice invites a newspaper food critic (Victor Buono) to eat at Mel's Diner, where he has his last meal.
7	7	"Sex Education"	Bruce Bilson	Patricia Jones & Donald Reiker	November 6, 1976	166558
When Alice finds a picture of a naked woman in Tommy's wallet, she decides to teach him about the birds and the bees. Guest starring Adam West as Mr. Turner, Tommy's teacher.
8	8	"Big Daddy Dawson's Coming"	Norman Abbott	Arnold Kane & Bruce Johnson	November 13, 1976	166559
Flo's ex-husband, a womanizer known as "Big Daddy" Dawson (Norman Alden), tries to court Alice.
9	9	"Good Night, Sweet Vera"	Norman Abbott	Simon Muntner	November 20, 1976	166560
Alice and Flo try to help Vera after she attempts suicide by overdosing on sleeping pills.
10	10	"The Dilemma"	James Sheldon	Martin Donovan	November 27, 1976	166561
Alice is faced with a dilemma when an old boyfriend she doesn't love proposes to her.
11	11	"Who Killed Bugs Bunny?"	Bruce Bilson	Lloyd J. Schwartz	December 4, 1976	166562
Alice talks Mel into taking Tommy on a camp-out that turns out to be a hunting trip.
12	12	"Mother-in-Law: Part 1"	William P. D'Angelo	Martin Donovan	December 11, 1976	166563
Alice's self-centered mother-in-law (Eileen Heckart) pays a visit.
13	13	"Mother-in-Law: Part 2"	William P. D'Angelo	Arnold Kane & Bruce Johnson and R.S. Allen	December 18, 1976	166564
Alice's mother-in-law says she wants to stay in Phoenix.
14	14	"Vera's Mortician"	Bill Hobin	Bruce Kane	December 25, 1976	166555
Vera dates a mortician (Tom Poston) whom Alice suspects is married.
15	15	"Mel's in Love"	Alan Rafkin	Gary David Goldberg	January 15, 1977	166565
Mel falls in love with a woman who hiked all the way from New Jersey (Susan Lanier).
16	16	"The Accident"	Alan Rafkin	Roy Kammerman and Harvey Bullock	January 22, 1977	166566
Flo wrecks Mel's car in an accident after he entrusts it to Alice.
17	17	"The Failure"	William P. D'Angelo	Art Baer & Ben Joelson	January 29, 1977	166567
A robber considers himself a failure when he tries to hold up the diner.
18	18	"The Hex"	Alan Rafkin	R.S. Allen & Arnold Kane	February 5, 1977	166568
A gypsy (Kaye Ballard) places a curse on the diner after she's caught stealing silverware.
19	19	"The Pain of No Return"	Alan Rafkin	Rick Mittleman	February 12, 1977	166569
A seemingly mild-mannered IRS agent informs Alice that her late husband never paid his taxes.
20	20	"The Odd Couple"	William P. D'Angelo	Story by : Roy Kammerman; Teleplay by : Roy Kammerman & Arnold Kane & Harvey Bullock & R.S. Allen	February 26, 1977	166570
Flo and her boyfriend drive Alice crazy when they bunk at her house after Flo's trailer is stolen.
21	21	"A Night to Remember"	Alan Rafkin	Arnold Kane and R.S. Allen	March 5, 1977	166571
Alice and Flo set out to find a man for Vera.
22	22	"Mel's Cup"	Norman Abbott	Roy Kammerman and Harvey Bullock	March 12, 1977	166572
Alice realizes that the silver cup she donated to a rummage sale belongs to Mel from his days in the Navy.
23	23	"The Bundle"	Norman Abbott	Ben Joelson & Art Baer	March 19, 1977	166573
Alice is the only one to return the $40,000 somebody left in the diner.
24	24	"Mel's Happy Burger"	Burt Brinckerhoff	Arnold Kane	March 26, 1977	166553
Alice wears a hamburger costume to promote Mel's Happy Burgers in a TV commercial.
