= The Heart Has Its Reasons =

The Heart Has Its Reasons may refer to:

- The Heart Has Its Reasons (memoir), a 1956 memoir by Wallis, Duchess of Windsor
- "The Heart Has Its Reasons" (song), a song from Roger Daltrey's 1987 album Can't Wait to See the Movie
- "The Heart Has Its Reasons" (2point4 children), an episode of 2point4 Children
- The Heart Has Its Reasons, translation of Dil-o-Danish by Krishna Sobti
