= List of 2point4 Children episodes =

2point4 Children is a British television sitcom which was broadcast on BBC One. Created and written by Andrew Marshall, the series follows the Porters, a working-class family who live in Chiswick, west London. It stars Belinda Lang, Gary Olsen, Julia Hills, Clare Woodgate (before being replaced by Clare Buckfield), and John Pickard.

Andrew Marshall wrote all episodes, with the exception of three, which were written by Paul Alexander, Simon Braithwaite and Paul Smith. The show was originally directed and produced by Richard Boden, but the later series were directed by Nick Wood, Dewi Humphreys and produced by Andrew Marshall.

During the course of the programme, 56 episodes of 2point4 Children aired, including five specials over eight series, between 3 September 1991 and 30 December 1999.

== Series overview ==
| Series | Episodes | Originally released | |
| Series | Episodes | First released | Last released |
|---|---|---|---|
| 1 | 6 | 3 September 1991 | 8 October 1991 |
| 2 | 7 | 8 September 1992 | 20 October 1992 |
| 2 | Special | 22 December 1992 | |
| 3 | 6 | 7 September 1993 | 12 October 1993 |
| 3 | Special | 20 December 1993 | |
| 4 | 6 | 5 September 1994 | 10 October 1994 |
| 4 | Special | 26 December 1994 | |
| 5 | 6 | 2 October 1995 | 6 November 1995 |
| 5 | Special | 24 December 1995 | |
| 6 | 7 | 14 November 1996 | 20 December 1996 |
| 6 | Special | 26 December 1996 | |
| 7 | 7 | 26 February 1998 | 9 April 1998 |
| 8 | 6 | 16 November 1999 | 30 December 1999 |

== Episodes ==
=== Series 1 (1991) ===
| No. overall | No. in series | Title | Directed by | Written by | Original release date |
|---|---|---|---|---|---|
| 1 | 1 | "Leader of the Pack" | Richard Boden | Andrew Marshall | 3 September 1991 |
Struggling to keep up with her role as a working mother, Bill's life is chaotic as she receives no help around the house from her husband, Ben, their son, David, and daughter, Jenny. Bill is called into Jenny's school to see the headmaster who explains that Jenny has not been attending classes. Bill discovers Jenny has been secretly dating a boy who rides a motorbike. However, Bill also meets handsome biker Angelo for the first time and wonders whether life would be better with him.
| 2 | 2 | "Saturday Night and Sunday Morning" | Richard Boden | Andrew Marshall | 10 September 1991 |
Jenny is unhappy with her new trainers, and Bill is struggling to keep the house in order. While attempting to do the washing at Rona's house, Bill confides in Rona about her meeting with Angelo. Ben arranges for the family to have Sunday dinner at his sister Tina's house which turns out to be a disaster. Tina's husband, Brian, takes Ben to the pub, leaving the women to stay at home to cook. Tina criticises Bill for choosing to work rather than stay at home with her children, and hits David when she discovers he has brought a rat into her house. Outraged, Bill storms out of the house with David and drives home in Ben's van, but panic sets when she remembers she does not know how to drive. However, Angelo shows up and guides Bill safely to the side of the road.
| 3 | 3 | "When the Going Gets Tough, the Tough Goes Shopping" | Richard Boden | Andrew Marshall | 17 September 1991 |
Bill goes food shopping at the supermarket for Ben's barbecue where she witnesses a shoplifter and gives chase. However, Bill herself is mistaken for the thief and is taken for questioning by the store detective. Meanwhile, Ben receives a letter from the Inland Revenue informing him of an appointment with a tax inspector. Ben's meeting with the tax inspector goes well when he finds out he is owed a rebate of £3,000. Jenny decides to become a vegetarian. Bill and Rona call a telephone number that was left on a piece of paper on Ben's van, which Bill expects to be from Angelo, only to discover it was left by a potential customer.
| 4 | 4 | "Love and Marriage" | Richard Boden | Andrew Marshall | 24 September 1991 |
Panic sets in as the Porters prepare for a dreaded visit from Bill's mother Bette. Bette proves to be a difficult guest when she takes Bill and Ben's bedroom and irritates them constantly with her demands. The next day, Bill returns home from work and discovers Bette in bed with an old flame. Appalled and upset at first, they later have a heart-to-heart conversation, and Bill realises she is becoming more like her mother with age. Bill bumps into Angelo again, telling him that she is married with two children. Meanwhile, Ben has to visit his ex-girlfriend Pauline to do some plumbing work. He tells her that he is married to Bill and has two children. She tells him that she is dissatisfied with her husband Trevor and tries to encourage Ben to have an affair with her.
| 5 | 5 | "Dirty Bowling" | Richard Boden | Andrew Marshall | 1 October 1991 |
It is discovered that Ben is making secretive trips to his workshop. Meanwhile, Bill is under pressure from keeping up with the housework, coping with a new manager at the bakery and learning to drive, and overlooks that her daughter Jenny has broken up with her boyfriend. Bill and Ben go bowling whilst Rona babysits David and Jenny. Rona talks to Jenny and reminisces about her wedding, when she jilted the groom at the altar. Bill passes her driving test and is eager to show him her new driving skills and to see the work Ben has been doing on the family car but is shocked to discover that their Austin Montego has been replaced with a 1950s Chevrolet.
| 6 | 6 | "Young at Heart" | Richard Boden | Andrew Marshall | 8 October 1991 |
Money is tight in the Porter household as Ben spent all the rebate money on the car, and Bill's manager refuses to pay her wages on time. Bill makes a trip to the bank to ask for a small loan, which is rejected. She meets Angelo again and they have a conversation. It is revealed that David and his friend Sammy have been playing strip Happy Families with a girl called Judith and her mother complains to Bill about it. Bill visits Sammy's mother Marie, who lives in poverty on a council estate. Ben talks to David about the birds and the bees but finds that David is more knowledgeable on the subject than he was expecting. Rona writes her telephone number on a carrier bag for a customer at the bakery, which is taken by the manager who begins calling and pestering her for sex. To punish him for his inappropriate behaviour, Bill and Rona lead him on, allowing him to strip completely naked, before quitting their jobs and locking him inside the shop. Lacking the second income from Bill's job, Ben decides to sell the car, but knowing how much pleasure he gets from it, Bill allows him to keep it.

=== Series 2 (1992) ===
| No. overall | No. in series | Title | Directed by | Written by | Original release date |
|---|---|---|---|---|---|
| 7 | 1 | "I'm Going Slightly Mad" | Richard Boden | Andrew Marshall | 8 September 1992 |
Bill is bored at home and is struggling to keep busy. Ben hires a new assistant, Chris, whom he is surprised to discover is a young woman called Christine. Bill has been unemployed for some time and has to sign on, but during her appointment at the DHSS it turns out the advisor is emotionally unstable and is struggling to make a career for herself. Later, Bill manages to find a job with Rona at an airline meals factory. That night, exhausted after her first shift, Bill falls asleep on the couch, and it is revealed in a television news report that Angelo has died in a motorcycle crash.
| 8 | 2 | "Bedtime for Bonzo" | Richard Boden | Andrew Marshall | 15 September 1992 |
Bill tells Jenny that she hates her new job at the factory, and the hours are affecting her wellbeing. Ben catches the flu and Bill tries to find aspirin pills. Bill also has to look after next door neighbours Leonard and Nora Grimes' elderly dog, Rufus, who suffers from flatulence. When Rufus becomes sick with digestive problems, the Porters must decide whether to euthanise him or let him live in pain. Ben feels uncomfortable with Bill's decision to have Rufus euthanised. David grows fascinated with death, especially after seeing a report on TV about a fire in the High Street which has killed some people.
| 9 | 3 | "Hormones" | Richard Boden | Andrew Marshall | 22 September 1992 |
Inspired by the Terminator, Ben drives aggressively on the way to a parents' evening at David's school, nearly colliding with a driver. Bill fears Ben is influencing David's growing obsession with violence and death, though Ben denies it. Ben confronts the driver, but when he finds out that the driver is a wheelchair user, he feels ashamed. Ben challenges the driver to a wheelchair race. Everyone thinks Jenny is playing truant from school to avoid taking part in sports. Bill fears she is pregnant and buys a home pregnancy test. Upon discovering that one of the testers is missing, she believes Jenny is pregnant. However, after Rona speaks to Jenny, she confides in Bill that she is suffering from bulimia. Later, it is discovered that Ben took the pregnancy test and says that he is pregnant.
| 10 | 4 | "One Night in Bangkok" | Richard Boden | Andrew Marshall | 29 September 1992 |
Bill is finding work at the airline meals factory a challenge. To cheer her up, Rona tries to persuade her to go on a girls' night out and see a group of male strippers. Tina and her partner Brian arrive to tell Ben that their estranged father Frank is returning to the country and invite him and Bill to their house for a family reunion. Ben and Tina disapprove of their father's marriage to Darrani, a much younger woman from Thailand. Rona and Bill take Tina and Darrani to see male strippers, where Rona discovers one of the strippers is her ex-fiancé, Gordon. Frank visits the Porters to try to make amends with Ben for being absent all his life. Bill finds out about Angelo's death.
| 11 | 5 | "The Skeletons in the Cupboard" | Richard Boden | Andrew Marshall | 6 October 1992 |
Ben secretly films his family with his camcorder. Feeling unfulfilled and strained by the hours of work at the airline meals factory, Bill decides to find another job. At home, Bill tells Jenny and David they can be in charge of the household for the night. Rona agrees to go on a date with Gordon. When Gordon takes Rona to a singles bar, he discovers that since their breakup, Rona has had relationships with many men. Bill attends a job interview which does not go well; she finds her interviewer has suffered a nervous breakdown after being made redundant and discovers that the job does not actually exist. Later, Rona reveals that she is marrying Gordon, and wants Bill to do the catering for the wedding.
| 12 | 6 | "Bird on a Wire" | Richard Boden | Andrew Marshall | 13 October 1992 |
Rona gets ready for her wedding to Gordon, and the Porters' house is in chaos as Bill prepares the food. David complains that he feels sick and wants to stay at home, and Ben decides to escape the house and keep a low profile. David asks his father about sex and love, but Ben is unable to answer. Bill arrives at Rona's house, but discovers she is hanging from a light fitting in her wedding dress. Bill gets her head stuck in a cat flap. After Rona and Bill are set free and return to the Porters' house, Jenny discovers David unconscious. Rona tells Bill and Ben to take David to the hospital in her wedding car, leaving Rona to hail a taxi. Later, a doctor tells Bill and Ben that David is suffering from tetanus and is in a critical condition.
| 13 | 7 | "Thank Your Lucky Stars" | Richard Boden | Andrew Marshall | 20 October 1992 |
While Bill, Ben and Jenny await news of David from the doctor and express their guilt over ignoring his ill health, Rona attempts to make it to her wedding by bus. However, after a conversation with a woman on the bus, Rona has second thoughts about the wedding. While David lies in a coma, Angelo the biker appears to him in a dream and David confides in Angelo that he feels unwanted and unloved by his family and is not sure whether to continue living. When Rona arrives at the church, she discovers the church is filled with her ex-boyfriends and runs out on her groom. In David's hospital room, Ben begins talking to David, explaining that he loves him and the family want him back.
Christmas special
| 14 | S | "Misery" | Richard Boden | Andrew Marshall | 22 December 1992 |
The Porters spend Christmas in hell at Bill's mother's house, while Rona spends the holidays alone. Note: This is the last episode to feature Georgina Cates before Clare Buckfield takes over the role of Jenny.

=== Series 3 (1993) ===
| No. overall | No. in series | Title | Directed by | Written by | Original release date |
|---|---|---|---|---|---|
| 15 | 1 | "The Secret Diary of David Porter" | Richard Boden | Andrew Marshall | 7 September 1993 |
While cleaning David's room, Bill finds his diary and reads it, revealing previous mishaps in the Porter household. These include David cutting up a brain with a bread knife and Rona's gay brother getting close and personal with Ben. Bill visits her mother's twin sister Belle, who refuses to leave her flat. Whilst Bill is waiting for Rona to pick her up, a prostitute mistakenly assumes Bill to be competing with her for clients.
| 16 | 2 | "When the Children are Asleep" | Richard Boden | Andrew Marshall | 14 September 1993 |
When Bill thinks the house next door is being robbed, she sets in motion a chain of events filled with terror, burglary, and radio phone-ins. While David and Jenny are asleep, Bill and Ben see two men smuggling goods into a car, leading them to believe the pair are thieves. However, Bill and Ben trespass in their neighbours' home which leads to them looking like thieves.
| 17 | 3 | "Badger's Bend" | Richard Boden | Andrew Marshall | 21 September 1993 |
Bill discovers that Ben becomes addicted to a computer game Ninja Badger, trying to relieve the stress at work through losing customers and having a serious addiction problem. Meanwhile, Rona attends a reunion at her former Catholic school. She tells a former classmate that she is a widowed mother, despite her having never married or had children and Rona pays a visit to her old school reunion in an attempt to drum up interest in the catering business.
| 18 | 4 | "The Women Who Were on the Verge of a Nervous Breakdown" | Richard Boden | Andrew Marshall | 28 September 1993 |
Bill and Rona's first job is disrupted and Ben gets locked out of his house and Jenny helps Bill and Rona in a catering event. The day is stressful for the women and added to their troubles is the annoying Tina who begs Bill to find out if her husband is cheating on her by Mother Nature.
| 19 | 5 | "Beam Me Up, Scotty" | Richard Boden | Andrew Marshall | 5 October 1993 |
Bill's business faces closure and Ben's business is also in trouble because of his feud with rival heating repairman Jake Klinger, making him ending when Jake dies, and a Star Trek funeral is prepared for him. However, it is later revealed to be a prank when Jake turns up at his funeral alive. A health inspector visits the Porters' house to see if their kitchen is fit for a catering business. Bill and Rona go to the bank for a business loan, where the adviser tells her that they will need to put up collateral to secure it. Ben decides to put the car up as collateral. The Porters fly to Miami at the end of the episode.
| 20 | 6 | "Whoopee, We're All Going to Die" | Richard Boden | Andrew Marshall | 12 October 1993 |
The Porters are enjoying their holiday in the Florida Keys but have to flee to Miami to look like ending a disaster when escape a hurricane named Bill's namesake pursues her across America. Rona tries to seduce Tony and encourage him to father her baby, so that she can become a mother. However, he does not agree to impregnating her, and they both agree to put the idea of pregnancy on hold.
Christmas special
| 21 | S | "The Babes in the Wood" | Richard Boden | Andrew Marshall | 20 December 1993 |
On their way to a hotel, the Porters become lost in the middle of nowhere and have to spend the night in an abandoned old house. The night takes a darker turn when they go missing one by one. Meanwhile, Bill's mother and Auntie Pearl get up to mischief in a hotel after smoking suspicious cigarettes.

=== Series 4 (1994) ===
| No. overall | No. in series | Title | Directed by | Written by | Original release date |
|---|---|---|---|---|---|
| 22 | 1 | "The Parent Trap" | Richard Boden | Andrew Marshall | 5 September 1994 |
Bill promises Jenny that she will not do anything to embarrass Jenny's boyfriend Clive's parents. Bill gives them a box of chocolates, which she does not realise contains David's cockroaches. Ben has bought home an inflatable Pope which they try to deflate before Clive's parents arrive at their house.
| 23 | 2 | "The Family Plot" | Richard Boden | Andrew Marshall | 12 September 1994 |
There is a power cut in the Porter household, so Ben tries to fix the problem, which requires a fuse wire. However, Bill wants to spend the evening with the family without the television and stereo, so decides to put the wire in a self-addressed stamped envelope and places it in the post box. Bill's evening of conversation with the family goes from bad to worse due to the arguments, and the lighting and heating switching off, so Bill decides to retrieve the fuse wire and come clean to the family.
| 24 | 3 | "Fortuosity" | Richard Boden | Andrew Marshall | 19 September 1994 |
Bill receives a chain letter threatening bad luck if not continued. Against Ben's wishes she tears up the letters, and unfortunate events occur soon afterwards. When another four copies of the letter arrive, suspicion falls upon Rona, causing an argument. However, Tina arrives at the house and tells Bill that she has sent them. Meanwhile, Ben is about to jump out of an aeroplane to do his first parachute jump.
| 25 | 4 | "Curiosity Who Killed the Cat" | Richard Boden | Andrew Marshall | 26 September 1994 |
Bill is ill in bed and worried about what is going on outside her bedroom. Jenny confides in Bill that she has tried to have sex with Clive. Bill watches Rona with a telescope, and spots Rona dragging a large bag to her car, fearing that Rona may have killed Tony. However, Rona visits Bill and reveals that she took Tony out of the house under cover to prevent his jealous ex-wife from discovering their relationship. Ben is looking after the Grimeses' cat, Snowdrop, during their holiday. When he discovers the cat is missing, Ben goes on a wild goose chase after a cat that is later revealed not to be Snowdrop. The Porters are pleased to discover the builders have completed their work in the kitchen but discover that Snowdrop is buried under the floorboards.
| 26 | 5 | "Frenzy" | Richard Boden | Andrew Marshall | 3 October 1994 |
Bill is busy working in her new kitchen and is too preoccupied to talk to Jenny talk about her anxiety over her school's upcoming talent show. It is discovered that Jenny is in competition with a girl named Charlene who is also starring in the talent show. Ben and David offer to help Jenny with her performance. Meanwhile, Rona's attempts to conceive have now become so bizarre and demanding that Tony is planning to call off their relationship. Later, Bill visits Rona and finds two cobras in her living room, which have escaped after being found in pizza delivery boxes which Rona ordered. Whilst there, Bill is horrified to discover that her house is on fire.
| 27 | 6 | "You Only Live Twice" | Richard Boden | Andrew Marshall | 10 October 1994 |
After discovering the Porters' house is on fire, Bill and the family have to stay at Rona's house while the fire brigade attempt to put it out. After the fire brigade leave, Bill inspects the damage to her house. Bette arrives with a skip to clean up the mess, and friends and relatives come over to help clear up. Bill and Ben redecorate. Meanwhile, Rona is worried that Tony wants to end the relationship and tries to stop Tony from leaving her.
Christmas special
| 28 | S | "Relax-ay-voo" | Richard Boden | Andrew Marshall | 26 December 1994 |
Rona, Bette and Auntie Pearl spend the evening at the Porter's house for Christmas. When David receives emails from an anonymous person asking for Bill, suspicions seep into the household. Bill realises the sender knows her name and that any of her wishes will be granted immediately.

=== Series 5 (1995) ===
| No. overall | No. in series | Title | Directed by | Written by | Original release date |
|---|---|---|---|---|---|
| 29 | 1 | "Greed" | Richard Boden | Andrew Marshall | 2 October 1995 |
To Bill's dislike, Ben has bought a lottery ticket and the prospect of winning millions causes arguments and speculation about how they would spend the money if they won the jackpot. Bill panics when she sees that Ben's lottery ticket has been destroyed in the washing machine. It is discovered that Ben had chosen the numbers at random, so Bill and Rona try to buy a replacement.
| 30 | 2 | "We Would Like to Know a Little Bit About You for Our Files" | Richard Boden | Andrew Marshall | 9 October 1995 |
David frequently sneaks out the house and Jenny and Bill are determined to find out what he is doing. Rona suggests that he is having sex. Bill initially dismisses this suggestion, saying that he is too young, but she then realises that it is a possibility. They discover a phone number on a piece of paper, and when an older woman answers, it is suspected David is having an underage relationship. However, when Bill and Ben arrive at her house, it is discovered she is a tutor who is helping David prepare for a role in the school acting competition.
| 31 | 3 | "The Deep" | Richard Boden | Andrew Marshall | 16 October 1995 |
After Ben knocks through a wall in the house with a sledgehammer and a stranger phones repeatedly and talks in German, Ben tells Bill he agreed they would look after the Grimeses' house whilst they are on holiday in Switzerland. However, they also realise that they are supposed to be looking after their pets, but the Porters do not know which animals they are and where they are kept. Upon arriving at the Grimeses house, they find a pond containing several dead fish. Bill and Ben attempt to buy some new fish for the pond before the Grimeses return home. However, upon their return, it is revealed that the fish died before they left and that they have racing pigeons.
| 32 | 4 | "Mayday" | Richard Boden | Andrew Marshall | 23 October 1995 |
Bill and Rona look at a Portakabin which they intend to use for their business. Meanwhile, Ben and David attempt to fix the hole in the wall. Jenny prepares for a visit from Clive, his mother Laura and her German mother Sophie, to the Porter household. Bill's anti-German mother Bette and Rona's Auntie Pearl arrive soon before Clive and his family are due, so Bill and Rona try to prevent them from meeting each other. Whilst the family are downstairs at the Porters, Sophie and Bill are shocked to discover Christine in a cupboard dressed as Adolf Hitler and an unexploded bomb falls through the ceiling.
| 33 | 5 | "Seven Dials" | Richard Boden | Andrew Marshall | 30 October 1995 |
Ben plays a prank on Jake, phoning him at 3am, pretending to be a Welsh customer who has a leak in the bathroom. Jake arrives at the location, a show house, to find a rotting leek stuck to the wall. After Ben is knocked unconscious in an accident at a café, Jake kidnaps him and takes him to Portmeirion, where he is chased with a giant white balloon. Bill and Rona break into a warehouse they are planning on using for their business, only to discover it is full of Shirley Bassey's stage gowns. David prepares for his performance in the school acting competition; however, he is disappointed that Bill and Ben will not show up to the performance. Bill and Ben arrive home to news from David that he has won the competition.
| 34 | 6 | "The Truth Is Out There" | Richard Boden | Andrew Marshall | 6 November 1995 |
Tony has moved in with Rona and informed the council that her mother Ena, who died eleven years earlier, is now dead. Rona has kept the secret for eleven years in order to continue living in her council house. Rona tries to find her birth certificate, to provide proof to the council that she is Ena's daughter. Later, the Porters gather at Rona's to test out a ghost-tracking device, to see if the spirit of Rona's mother has risen from the grave. Auntie Pearl gives Rona her birth certificate and reveals that she is her biological mother, explaining that she was single and pregnant, and gave Rona to her sister and her husband, who were unable to conceive.
Christmas special
| 35 | S | "Porky's" | Richard Boden | Andrew Marshall | 24 December 1995 |
As always, the festive occasion does not go to plan for the Porter family. This year, Ben reveals to the family that he has been keeping a live pig in a lockup garage since it was delivered by a courier in August. Prior to the delivery, he had thought it would arrive cut up and ready to cook. The family want to eat it for Christmas dinner; however, they do not want to kill it. After trying to find a way of removing the pig from their house, it is later discovered that the pig is pregnant.

=== Series 6 (1996) ===
| No. overall | No. in series | Title | Directed by | Written by | Original release date |
|---|---|---|---|---|---|
| 36 | 1 | "Dog Day Afternoon" | Nick Wood | Andrew Marshall | 14 November 1996 |
Bill and Rona look at a garage to use as storage for their business. Meanwhile, Ben is bored because the football season has ended. He resorts to putting slugs on one side of a bush in the garden and snails on the other, to see who eats it the fastest. Bill assumes that Clive is going to a jeweller to buy an engagement ring for Jenny. Ben, David and Rona all agree that Jenny is not ready for engagement. Bill and Rona compete with Ben and David to find Clive first to try and talk Clive out of the proposal. However, when they meet Clive, they discover that the ring he is intending to buy is a body piercing.
| 37 | 2 | "The Lady Vanishes" | Nick Wood | Andrew Marshall | 21 November 1996 |
On an eerie Halloween evening, the Porters consider the implications of the disappearance of Mrs Crudaal, their next-door neighbour, and the delivery of a large box to the same address. Bill believes her surname to be Crandall, but Ben discovers that it is Crudaal, which is an anagram of Dracula.
| 38 | 3 | "Vertigo" | Nick Wood | Andrew Marshall | 28 November 1996 |
Bill and Rona visit Bill's aunt Belle, who is living in a tower block. Belle is stuck on the window ledge several floors up, having gone out there to feed the pigeons. While trying to save her, Rona and Bill also become stuck. Rona tries to convince Bill that the situation they are in has been brought on by a horoscope.
| 39 | 4 | "The Trouble With Harry" | Nick Wood | Andrew Marshall | 5 December 1996 |
When Ben, Jenny and David desire for the family to have a dog, Bill agrees against her better judgement to have an imaginary dog, Harry, for a trial period of two weeks. However, Bill is shocked to find a real dog, a Golden Retriever, in the house, which belongs to a blind man. Later, Ben, Jenny and David bring a golden retriever home.
| 40 | 5 | "The Man Who Knew Too Much" | Nick Wood | Andrew Marshall | 12 December 1996 |
Ben in his birthday blues is 38 and feeling depressed over the prospect of middle age too much. This results in him applying to join the exclusive plumber society, the Brotherhood of the Plunger. Ben has to perform rituals to be eligible to join and is later invited to a meeting. He wrongly assumes his invitation to be a prank by Jake and is ejected from the meeting.
| 41 | 6 | "The Lion, The Witch and the Wardrobe" | Nick Wood | Andrew Marshall | 19 December 1996 |
Ben's midlife crisis worsens. Meanwhile, Bill is astonished to be left two items by a distant relation: a wardrobe and a genuine fur coat. As Jenny disapproves of the fur trade, Bill hides in the wardrobe whilst wearing the coat. However, she is taken to an auction and is discovered by Jenny at an anti-fur demonstration. Rona discovers she has cravings for strange combinations of food, making her suspect a pregnancy. However, a test shows that she is not pregnant, but has diabetes. When leaving the hospital, she finds an abandoned baby girl under a bush.
| 42 | 7 | "And Now the Screaming Starts" | Nick Wood | Andrew Marshall | 20 December 1996 |
Christine arrives at the Porter household to reveal that Ben is missing from work. Bill, Christine and Harry attempt to find him. Rona brings the baby home and tries to hide her from Bill. Upon discovery of the baby, Bill convinces Rona to take her to the police station. Note: The song "Age" in this episode performed by Gary Olsen was written by Simon Brint.
Christmas special
| 43 | S | "Two Years Before the Mast" | Nick Wood | Andrew Marshall | 26 December 1996 |
Tina has booked herself on a luxury Christmas cruise. When Bill and company give Ben's sister a lift to the ship, they end up crashing into the captain's car. Later, after getting onto the ship to say goodbye to Tina, it departs. But when Bill, Ben, David and Rona try to disguise themselves, they prevent the captain from recognising them.

=== Series 7 (1998) ===
| No. overall | No. in series | Title | Directed by | Written by | Original release date |
|---|---|---|---|---|---|
| 44 | 1 | "The Perfect Day" | Nick Wood | Andrew Marshall | 26 February 1998 |
Ben has returned home with a replacement car, which turns out to be a replica of FAB 1 from Thunderbirds. David creates a fake letter to Jenny, giving her supposed A level results. In revenge, she dyes his hair green. These events lead to the family not speaking to each other. Later, Jenny discovers her real A level results which enable her to go to university. Rona discovers that a social worker has come to visit regarding an adoption application.
| 45 | 2 | "When Saturday Comes" | Nick Wood | Andrew Marshall | 5 March 1998 |
After Ben and David's football team win a crucial match, Ben believes the team's success was for superstitious reasons, hence he insists the Porters perform the same routine during the following two Saturdays. However, it is later discovered that Ben has bet some of the neighbours that the team would win, and that the forfeit for losing is to sing at the shopping precinct dressed as the Spice Girls.
| 46 | 3 | "Malcolm X" | Nick Wood | Paul Smith | 12 March 1998 |
An old flame of Bill's, Malcolm Walker, phones her to meet for a reunion. Bill is tempted by Malcolm's offer of travelling to Scotland with him for a break from her chaotic life. However, Ben becomes jealous and tries to break up the relationship. Whilst meeting up with them in Scotland, it is later discovered by Bill that Malcolm is married.
| 47 | 4 | "The Sweet Hereafter" | Nick Wood | Paul Alexander and Simon Braithwaite | 19 March 1998 |
Ben brings home a box of food products to test for market research. It is discovered that amongst the items is a chocolate bar, that has profound effects on those who eat it. Ben, David and Jenny soon become addicted, and it is left to Bill to try and remove the offending items.
| 48 | 5 | "When Did You Last See Your Father?" | Nick Wood | Andrew Marshall | 26 March 1998 |
Bill and Bette visit Bill's father's memorial plaque, ten years after his death. Bette informs her that she did not have Bill's father cremated but had him frozen instead and his corpse is stored in a warehouse. Unfortunately for Bill, she has to take the body in its freezer back home with her. Bette loses her handbag which is later discovered to have been left in the freezer with the corpse.
| 49 | 6 | "The Italian Job" | Nick Wood | Paul Smith | 2 April 1998 |
The Porters meet David's Italian penpal Fabrizio at Heathrow Airport. He stays with the Porters for a week. However, Bill becomes increasingly frustrated by his demands and hedonistic lifestyle, especially after he seduces David's girlfriend Maxine on a night out. After Fabrizio is recognised and treated with reverence at an Italian restaurant, Ben assumes Fabrizio's father is a high-ranking mafioso. However, it is later revealed that Fabrizio's father is a Juventus goalkeeper.
| 50 | 7 | "The Heart Has Its Reasons" | Nick Wood | Andrew Marshall | 9 April 1998 |
Jenny is taken to university by her parents. However, upon arrival, Ben's van is broken into by children. One of the children, Declan, is discovered to be homeless after running away from care and being abandoned by his mother. Bill and Ben decide to let him stay for the weekend, and consider fostering him. However, it is later revealed that the Porter house has been burgled and Ben assumes that Declan invited his friends to do it, but later Declan arranges for the stolen items to be returned.

=== Series 8 (1999) ===
| No. overall | No. in series | Title | Directed by | Written by | Original release date | UK viewers (millions) |
|---|---|---|---|---|---|---|
| 51 | 1 | "Fame" | Dewi Humphreys | Andrew Marshall | 16 November 1999 | 7.01 |
A film crew arrive at the Porters' to film a fly on the wall documentary about typical working-class family life, but Bill is against the idea and decides to make the family seem unappealing to the television company. Another very similar family, the Bakers, are chosen for the programme instead. Later, Bill is shocked to discover that Changing Rooms has redecorated their lounge in garish, bright colours and patterns.
| 52 | 2 | "Enter the Dragon" | Dewi Humphreys | Andrew Marshall | 23 November 1999 | 7.00 |
Declan has arrived for a series of weekend stays in preparation for his fostering with the Porters. However, the family are shocked when they discover that Bette has moved into Jenny's room. Bette's indulgence of Declan's behaviour goes against the Porters' rules and causes chaos in the household. It is later discovered that Declan has hatched a plan to make her leave.
| 53 | 3 | "Sticky Fingers" | Dewi Humphreys | Andrew Marshall | 30 November 1999 | 6.94 |
Jenny comes home for the weekend but also brings her new boyfriend Keith along, much to Ben's disapproval. To prevent the pair having sex under his roof, Ben tries to make Keith too tired to do so, by asking him to help move heavy furniture. This backfires on Ben through an accident involving a runaway piano. Declan is arrested on suspicion of shoplifting. Meanwhile, Bill and Declan have sticky problems while Rona and Jenny are working in the warehouse to apply glue to a floor. However, since they did not realise they need to keep the room ventilated and wear face masks, they all end up high on solvents.
| 54 | 4 | "After the Fox" | Dewi Humphreys | Andrew Marshall | 7 December 1999 | 6.47 |
In order to make a winning bid on a catering job, Bill is persuaded against her better judgement to take the van to Calais with Rona to buy a large amount of alcohol at a much lower price. Rona accidentally allows what she thinks is a small dog to stow away on the van, which they later discover to be a fox. They return to France to take it back.
| 55 | 5 | "Carry On Screaming" | Dewi Humphreys | Andrew Marshall | 14 December 1999 | N/A <(6.9) (Note: Not reported in the weekly top 30 programmes for BARB viewer ratings.) |
On a Jack O Lantern, a social worker visits the Porter household on Halloween to reveal that Declan is to be fostered indefinitely by them. She gives Ben contact details for his Uncle Lon (his mother's brother) of whose existence he had been unaware. Ben's mother left the family when Ben was three, and he has not seen her for many years. Bill and Ben meet Lon twice. Lon does not know where she is, or even if she is alive. He gives Ben old family photos, from which Ben realises that his mother is Jewish.
| 56 | 6 | "The Millennium Experience" | Dewi Humphreys | Andrew Marshall | 30 December 1999 | 9.03 |
As the Porters gather to see in the millennium, Tina arrives and reports what she thinks is a gas leak. While workmen attempt to solve the issue, they accidentally sever electricity cables, causing a power cut. The family spend the night in darkness in the lounge, reminiscing on embarrassing situations from the past and revealing secrets about themselves. Later, it is believed there is an unexploded World War II bomb in the street.

== Home media ==
BBC Enterprises released a video in 1993, comprising the first three episodes of the series, which are known as: Leader of the Pack, Saturday Night and Sunday Morning, and When the Going Gets Tough, the Tough Go Shopping.

The first three seasons were released individually on Region 2 DVDs by Eureka Video in 2005. A box set of the first three seasons was subsequently made available in 2008, again through Eureka Video.both with music edits.
