= Jane Booker =

English actress

Jane P Booker (born 9 May 1956) is an English actress. She was born in Stratford-upon-Avon, Warwickshire, and has over 40 television roles to her credit.

One of her first roles was in James Ivory's "Hullabaloo Over Georgie and Bonnie's Pictures" (1978), which starred Dame Peggy Ashcroft and Larry Pine. In 1979 she played Nurse Sally in the mini-series Testament of Youth, Vera Brittain's classic memoir of World War I.

== Selected filmography ==
=== Television ===
- Doctors: episode "Mr Right", (2011)
- Midsomer Murders: episode "The Creeper", (2009)
- Doctors: episode "All That Glitters", (2009)
- Casualty, (2007)
- Doctors: episode "A Secure Relationship", (2007)
- My Family, (2004, 2006)
- North and South, (2004), the dramatization of the Elizabeth Gaskell novel, as Mrs. Shaw
- Foyle's War, (2002)
- Jonathan Creek, (1999)
- Midsomer Murders: episode "Written in Blood", (1998)
- Coronation Street, (1996)
- Murder Most Horrid: episode "Mangez Merveillac", (1994)
- Get Back, (1992–1993), as Prudence Sweet
- The Darling Buds of May, (1991–1993)
- Murder Most Horrid: "Murder At Tea Time", (1991)
- Troublemakers, (1990)
- Inspector Morse, (1989), as Philippa Foster in "Deceived by Flight"
- Colin's Sandwich, (1988–1989)
- Agatha Christie's Miss Marple: Nemesis, (1987), as Miss Cooke
- A Perfect Spy, (1987), nominated for four BAFTA awards, including Best Drama Series, and two Emmy Awards, including Outstanding Miniseries.
- Don't Wait Up, (1987–1988)
- Throb, (1986)
- First Among Equals, (1986), as Fiona Seymour
- Travelling Man, (1985)
- Agatha Christie's "Partners in Crime" episode "The Clergyman's Daughter", (1983)
- Nanny, (1982-1983), where she portrayed the Duchess of Broughton / Lady Charlotte Somerville,
- Pig in the Middle, (1981)
- Angels, (1979)

=== Film ===
- Finding Neverland (2004), as Mrs. Darling
- Priest of Love (1981)

== Personal life ==
Booker married the actor James Fleet in 1985. The couple have one son together.
