= Alice season 6 =

Alice
- Season 6
- No. of episodes: 24

Release
- Original network: CBS
- Original release: October 4, 1981 – May 16, 1982

Season chronology
- ← Previous; Season 5 Next → Season 7

This is a list of episodes from the sixth season of the CBS-TV series Alice.

== Episodes ==
No. overall	No. in season	Title	Directed by	Written by	Original release date	Prod. code
117	1	"Bet a Million, Mel"	Nick Havinga	Bob Fisher & Arthur Marx	October 4, 1981	167462
Mel gets a hot tip on a horse and decides to borrow $10,000 to bet with. If he loses, he will lose the diner. The waitresses try to prevent Mel from making the bet.
118	2	"Guinness on Tap"	Marc Daniels	Mark Egan & Mark Solomon	October 11, 1981	167467
Vera becomes depressed when she realizes she has worked at Mel's for 8 years. She decides to leave her mark on the world by competing for the world record in tap dance endurance.
119	3	"Comrade Mel"	Marc Daniels	Prudence Fraser & Robert Sternin	October 18, 1981	167466
Mel gives asylum to a defecting towel boy (Robert Pierce) for the Russian ballet.
120	4	"Alice's Halloween Surprise"	Marc Daniels	Gail Honigberg	October 25, 1981	167464
Alice takes her new boyfriend Mitch's (Phillip R. Allen) four children out trick-or-treating and returns with one imposter.
121	5	"Alice's Big Four-Oh!"	Marc Daniels	Linda Morris & Vic Rauseo	November 8, 1981	167463
On the eve of Alice's 40th birthday, her mother visits and convinces her that she's over the hill.
122	6	"Mel's Cousin, Wendell"	Marc Daniels	Mark Egan & Linda Morris & Vic Rauseo & Mark Solomon	November 15, 1981	167222
Mel's is not looking forward to his nerdy cousin Wendell's visit, but when Vera catches his eye Wendell turns to Mel for advice on how to woo her.
123	7	"Vera's Bouncing Check"	Marc Daniels	Bob Brunner & Ken Hecht	November 29, 1981	167221
Vera causes trouble for Mel when she cashes an old school friend's check at the diner.
124	8	"After Mel's Gone"	Stockton Briggle	Bob Bruner & Ken Hecht	December 6, 1981	167465
Mel's beneficiaries start squabbling over what they will get when he passes away.
125	9	"Mel's Christmas Carol"	Marc Daniels	Linda Morris & Vic Rauseo	December 20, 1981	167474
The ghost of Mel's former partner Jake (Jack Gilford) returns to haunt him when Mel fires the waitresses for refusing to work on Christmas Eve.
126	10	"The Wild One"	Marc Daniels	Mike Weinberger	December 27, 1981	167461
Alice impresses the leader of a biker gang (Jay Leno) when she stands up to him for refusing to pay his check.
127	11	"Alice Calls the Shots"	Marc Daniels	Gail Honigberg	January 3, 1982	167469
At Mel and Earl's urging, Tommy sneaks out to play in a championship basketball game.
128	12	"Not with My Niece You Don't"	John Pasquin	Chet Dowling & Sandy Krinsky	January 17, 1982	167473
Tommy's dates with Mel's niece (Kim Richards) cause anxious moments for both Alice and Mel.
129	13	"Vera, Queen of Soaps"	Marc Daniels	Mark Egan & Mark Solomon	January 31, 1982	167475
Vera becomes hooked on daytime soap operas and quits the diner to watch her favorite show.
130	14	"Sharples vs. Sharples"	Linda Day	Mark Egan & Mark Solomon	February 7, 1982	167472
Mel explodes when he learns that his mother Carrie (Martha Raye) is including his secret chili recipe in a cookbook.
131	15	"The Valentine's Day Massacre"	John Pasquin	Mark Egan & Mark Solomon	February 14, 1982	167479
It's Valentine's Day, and everyone in the diner is planning on spending the evening with their dates.
132	16	"The Best Little Waitress in the World"	Mel Ferber	Linda Morris & Vic Rauseo	February 21, 1982	167471
Full of self-confidence, Vera is left in charge of the diner for a few minutes.
133	17	"Alice and the Acorns"	Marc Daniels	Mark Egan & Mark Solomon	March 7, 1982	167470
Alice tries to boost the confidence of an old high-school friend who is visiting.
134	18	"Jolene Hunnicutt, Dynamite Trucker"	Marc Daniels	Chet Dowling & Sandy Krinski	March 14, 1982	167476
Jolene offers to help her former trucking partner finish his haul.
135	19	"Mel Wins By a Nose"	Marc Daniels	Linda Morris & Vic Rauseo	March 21, 1982	167480
Mel returns from the doctor and announces that he has to have surgery for a deviated septum and his doctor suggested that if wanted a nose job, now would be the best time. This leads Mel to seriously consider getting a nose job.
136	20	"Give My Regrets to Broadway"	John Pasquin	Gail Honigberg	April 4, 1982	167482
When Tommy wins a part in a local theatrical production, he decides to leave school and become an actor.
137	21	"Vera's Reunion Romance"	Christine Ballard & Linda Lavin	Mark Egan & Gail Honigberg & Mark Solomon	April 11, 1982	167485
After attending her class reunion in Boston, Vera returns to Phoenix engaged.
138	22	"Monty Falls for Alice"	Marc Daniels	Mark Egan & Linda Morris & Vic Rauseo & Mark Solomon	April 18, 1982	167468
A Las Vegas busboy (George Wendt) arrives in Phoenix after breaking up with his fiancee and falls for Alice.
139	23	"Spell Mel's"	Marc Daniels	Chet Dowling & Sandy Krinski	May 2, 1982	167477
To keep up with a competitor, Mel runs a contest offering a $3,000 prize.
140	24	"My Mother the Landlord"	Marc Daniels	Chet Dowling & Sandy Krinski	May 16, 1982	167481
Mel's mother Carrie buys the building his apartment is in and raises his rent by $50.

== Broadcast history ==
The season originally aired Sundays at 9:00-9:30 pm (EST).
