= About Face (TV series) =

- Genre: Sitcom
- Starring: Maureen Lipman
- Country of origin: United Kingdom
- Original language: English
- No. of series: 2
- No. of episodes: 12

Production
- Running time: 30 minutes
- Production company: Central Independent Television

Original release
- Network: ITV
- Release: 6 November 1989 – 11 February 1991

About Face is a British sitcom consisting of twelve unconnected half-hour episodes starring Maureen Lipman. Each episode featured a guest cast of familiar personalities. The first set of six installments was broadcast in November–December 1989 and the second set in January–February 1991.

The episodes were written by Richard Harris, Geoffrey Perkins, Chips Hardy and John Henderson, Astrid Ronning, John Wells, Paul Smith and Terry Kyan, Jack Rosenthal (Lipman's husband), Carol Bunyan, as well as Ian Hislop and Nick Newman. It was made for the ITV network by Central Independent Television.

== Plot ==
Each episode has a stand-alone plot with Maureen Lipman playing a different character each time. She described the women as having "a certain emptiness in their lives".

== Episodes ==
=== Series One (1989) ===
Title	Airdate	Overview
Searching for Señor Duende	6 November 1989	Maureen Lipman plays Carol, a South London telephonist who becomes obsessed by flamenco dancing, which brings to an end her relationship with boyfriend Trevor (Michael Gambon).
Stand By Your Man	13 November 1989	Lipman is Helen, who exacts revenge on her husband Michael (Michael Jayston), a Member of Parliament, when the press interview her.
Gracie	20 November 1989	Gracie (Lipman), a Cypriot immigrant, is a cloakroom attendant a London club. But the celebrations to mark her quarter of a century there are altered by the arrival of Jessica, an American film star (Diana Weston). Also in the cast: Phyllida Law.
Mrs Worthington's Daughter	27 November 1989	Lipman is Patience, an American stage manager. She attends a first-night party that improves her morale.
Send Her Victorious	4 December 1989	Maureen Lipman plays Prime Minister Margaret Thatcher, with John Wells portraying her husband, Denis, as they are both kidnapped whilst on holiday. Also starred Richard Vernon, John Cater and Tony Slattery.
The Bag Lady	11 December 1989	Maureen Lipman is the sole cast member, as Wendy, The Bag Lady, who travels the streets of London in search of furniture she believes she lost to the Prime Minister thirty years ago. Writer Jack Rosenthal believed this to be one of his best works.

=== Series Two (1991) ===
Title	Airdate	Overview
Tourist Attraction	7 January 1991	Lipman is Louise, a tourist guide trying to finish work as soon as possible to meet her German boyfriend, who is only in town for one night. But she needs to persuade Ken, the coach driver played by Keith Barron, to drive faster. Also starred Carol Cleveland and Libby Morris.
This For The Half Darling	14 January 1991	Maureen Lipman plays Peggy, whose husband Guy prefers golf to his wife. Then Peggy takes up golf as well.
Requiem	21 January 1991	This time, Lipman plays Anne, a shop assistant and amateur opera singer, who wants her husband Keith to come and see her perform solo, but he wants to attend a Rotary function. Also starred Stephanie Cole.
Briefcase Encounter	28 January 1991	Set in an office in Reading, the focus is on the romance between Deirdre (Lipman) and Graham (Simon Cadell), the area manager. Also starred Robert Bathurst and Owen Brenman.
Monkey Business	4 February 1991	Helen Firebrace (Lipman) is going through customs when cocaine is found in her possession. The animal rights campaigner is finally let through without the customs officer (Bernard Hill) having spotted the chimpanzee. Also starred Rory McGrath.
Sleeping Sickness	11 February 1991	Maureen Lipman plays Dr MacBride, an over-worked and ambitious NHS registrar. Also starred William Gaunt, Martin Clunes and James Grout.
