= The Cedar Tree =

British ITV soap opera (1976–1979)

- Genre: Soap opera
- Created by: Alfred Shaughnessy
- Country of origin: United Kingdom
- No. of seasons: 3
- No. of episodes: 119

Production
- Producer: Ian Fordyce
- Running time: 30 mins (Series 1–2); 60 mins (Series 3).
- Production company: ATV

Original release
- Network: ITV
- Release: 20 September 1976 – 1979

The Cedar Tree is a British television serial that ran from 1976 to 1979 on ITV.

It involved the story of the upper class Bourne family in the decade leading up to the Second World War. The main setting is Larkfield Manor, the family home set in Herefordshire, in the grounds of which is the cedar tree.

The Cedar Tree was made by Associated Television Productions (ATV) and recorded at their studios at Elstree. Two established cast members were the veteran actress Joyce Carey and Susan Skipper, who played one of the Bourne family's daughters. Two other noted actors involved were Philip Latham as Commander Bourne, and Cyril Luckham, as Charles Ashley, the benevolent grandfather.

Series 1 and 2 were shown on ITV in the afternoon in a thirty-minute twice weekly format. Series 1 had 82 episodes and Series 2 had 24 episodes. Series 3, which was the final series, was given an evening prime time slot and the episodes were extended to sixty minutes. Series 3 consisted of only 13 episodes.

In a bizarre bit of casting, Jack Watling, who had been playing Captain Julian Palmer, an old friend of the Bourne family, in Series 2, took over the role of Arthur Bourne in Series 3.

In February 2013 it was announced that the first 1976 series was to be released on DVD. A complete box set of all three series has since been released.

== Episodes ==
=== Series 1 ===
1. Victoria
2. Elizabeth
3. Anne 1
4. Anne 2
5. A Question of Values 1
6. A Question of Values 2
7. Spring Fever 1
8. Spring Fever 2
9. One Come Down 1
10. One Come Down 2
11. Gerald 1
12. Gerald 2
13. The Quiet Side 1
14. The Quiet Side 2
15. Close of Play 1
16. Close of Play 2
17. High Tides 1
18. High Tides 2
19. The Mice at Play 1
20. The Mice at Play 2
21. Fête Accompli 1
22. Fête Accompli 2
23. Moment of Truth 1
24. Moment of Truth 2
25. Cause for Concern 1
26. Cause for Concern 2
27. Diagnosis 1
28. Diagnosis 2
29. The Treatment 1
30. The Treatment 2
31. A Quiet Christmas 1
32. A Quiet Christmas 2
33. Party Manners 1
34. Party Manners 2
35. Conflict 1
36. Conflict 2
37. A Lesson for Jim 1
38. A Lesson for Jim 2
39. Next of Kin 1*
40. Next of Kin 2
41. In Confidence 1
42. In Confidence 2
43. Easter Party 1
44. Easter Party 2
45. The Larger Size 1
46. The Larger Size 2
47. Gwilym 1
48. Gwilym 2
49. A Break in the Circle 1
50. A Break in the Circle 2
51. A Fresh Start 1
52. A Fresh Start 2
53. Outlook Unsettled 1
54. Outlook Unsettled 2
55. The Cost of a Secret 1
56. The Cost of a Secret 2
57. Trouble at Layford Park 1
58. Trouble at Layford Park 2
59. A Capital Idea 1
60. A Capital Idea 2
61. The Woman I Love 1
62. The Woman I Love 2
63. A Blessing in Disguise 1
64. A Blessing in Disguise 2
65. Turn of the Year 1
66. Turn of the Year 2
67. A Mackerel Sky 1
68. A Mackerel Sky 2
69. The Suspect 1
70. The Suspect 2
71. I Trust You 1
72. I Trust You 2
73. The Challenge 1
74. The Challenge 2
75. Miss Gribble 1
76. Miss Gribble 2
77. The New Member 1
78. The New Member 2
79. A Woman's Privilege 1
80. A Woman's Privilege 2
81. Consolation 1
82. Consolation 2

Note: Though Series 1 and Series 2 episodes of The Cedar Tree were transmitted in twice per week timeslots in Britain, these episodes were re-edited into an hour-long format (with adverts) for transmission overseas. Episode 39 of Series 1, "Next of Kin 1", which broadcast in Britain, is missing from the TV archives, so the DVD release uses the overseas broadcast of "Next of Kin" instead.

=== Series 2 ===
1. Autumn Tints 1
2. Autumn Tints 2
3. The Scapegoat 1
4. The Scapegoat 2
5. Rumour 1
6. Rumour 2
7. Mystery in Munich 1
8. Mystery in Munich 2
9. Official Enquiry 1
10. Official Enquiry 2
11. Deep Waters 1
12. Deep Waters 2
13. Recrimination 1
14. Recrimination 2
15. The Ugly Truth 1
16. The Ugly Truth 2
17. Cariad 1
18. Cariad 2
19. An Old Flame 1
20. An Old Flame 2
21. A Good Living 1
22. A Good Living 2
23. Blind Spot 1
24. Blind Spot 2

=== Series 3 ===
1. The Party Spirit
2. A Change of Plan
3. Nocturne
4. No Further Demands
5. Raising the Wind
6. Home and Abroad
7. A Race Against Time
8. Fools' Paradise
9. Times Remembered
10. On the March
11. In the Red
12. A Call to Arms
13. Peace for Our Time

== Cast ==
- Joyce Carey – Lady Alice Bourne, widowed mother of Arthur and Phyllis – 62 episodes
- Philip Latham – Commander Arthur Bourne (Series 1 and 2) – 74 episodes
- Jack Watling – Commander Arthur Bourne (Series 3) – 13 episodes
- Susan Engel – Helen Bourne, Arthur's wife – 28 episodes
- Sally Osborne – Elizabeth Bourne, eldest daughter of Arthur & Helen Bourne – 81 episodes
- Jennifer Lonsdale – Anne Bourne, middle daughter of Arthur & Helen Bourne – 28 episodes
- Susan Skipper – Victoria Bourne, youngest daughter of Arthur & Helen Bourne – 95 episodes
- Kate Coleridge – Phyllis Bourne, Arthur's sister – 71 episodes
- Cyril Luckham – Charles Ashley, father of Arthur's wife Helen – 47 episodes
- Gary Raymond – Jack Poole – 36 episodes
- Carol Royle – Laura Collins, friend of Victoria – 45 episodes
- Jean Taylor Smith – Nanny – 75 episodes
- Peter Hill – Fred Gates, the Bourne's chauffeur and general help – 78 episodes
- Ruth Holden – Mrs. Gates, the Bourne's housekeeper – 84 episodes
- Shaun Scott – Jim Tapper, assistant to Gates – 16 episodes
- Alan Browning – Geoffrey Cartland (Series 1 and 2) – 36 episodes
- Richard Thorp – Geoffrey Cartland (Series 3) – 5 episodes
- Lillias Walker – Rosemary Cartland – 57 episodes
- John Oxley – Peter Cartland – 52 episodes
- Tom Chatto – Parsons, the Cartlands' butler – 13 episodes
- John Hug – Gwilym Meredith-Jones – 11 episodes
- Joan Newell – Winifred Hedges – 5 episodes
- Patrick Ryecart – Klaus Von Heynig (Series 1) – 4 episodes
- Steven Pacey – Klaus Von Heynig (Series 2 and 3) – 16 episodes
- Nigel Havers – Rex Burton-Smith – 2 episodes
- Jack Watling – Captain Julian Palmer (Series 2) – 11 episodes
- Rosemary Nicols – Angela Scott, magazine reporter – 9 episodes
- Michael Macowan – Doctor Cropper – 5 episodes
- Pamela Mandell – Miss Pringle, owner of the Copper Kettle tearooms – 4 episodes
- Richard Vernon – Lord Evelyn Forbes, old flame of Lady Alice Bourne – 2 episodes
- Peter Egan – Ralph Marsh – 2 episodes
