= Alice season 8 =

Alice
- Season 8
- No. of episodes: 23

Release
- Original network: CBS
- Original release: October 2, 1983 – May 20, 1984

Season chronology
- ← Previous; Season 7 Next → Season 9

This is a list of episodes from the eighth season of Alice.

== Episodes ==
No. overall	No. in season	Title	Directed by	Written by	Original release date	Prod. code
164	1	"Mel is Hogg-Tied"	John Pasquin	Mark Egan & Mark Solomon	October 2, 1983	185206
Boss Hogg (special guest star Sorrell Booke), who's a distant cousin of Jolene's, arrives from Hazzard County and tries to swindle Mel into selling his diner to him for $1. Sonny Shroyer also guest stars as Deputy Enos Strate.
165	2	"Vera's Secret Lover"	Marc Daniels	Gail Honigberg	October 9, 1983	167624
Presents and love poems come Vera's way and everyone's trying to find out who's sending them.
166	3	"Jolene Gets Her Wings"	Marc Daniels	Linda Morris & Vic Rauseo	October 16, 1983	185204
Jolene realizes her childhood dream of becoming a flight attendant.
167	4	"Alice's Blind Date"	Dolores Ferraro	Bob Stevens	October 23, 1983	185203
Alice's social life gets a lift when she makes a date with her old high-school flame (Dennis Holahan), who's in town on a business trip, and, as she then discovers, is now blind.
168	5	"It Had to Be Mel"	Marc Daniels	Lindsay Harrison	October 30, 1983	185205
Mel falls for a famous singer (special guest star Florence Henderson) who stops in for directions. When she proposes, Mel accepts and prepares to move to Los Angeles.
169	6	"The Over-the-Hill Girls"	Tom Trbovich	Mark Egan & Mark Solomon	November 6, 1983	185208
Alice tries to help Mel's mother (Martha Raye) fight the tedium of old age by suggesting that she start a singing career.
170	7	"Vera Gets Engaged"	Marc Daniels	Bob Bendetson & Howard Bendetson	November 20, 1983	185210
Vera falls for Eliott Novak (Charles Levin), a police officer who she met after jaywalking and within two weeks they are engaged and planning a wedding.
171	8	"Vera's Wedding"	Marc Daniels	Story by : Mark Solomon; Teleplay by : Gail Honigberg	November 20, 1983	185211
Vera's marriage plans take a detour when she and Mel mistakenly exchange wedding vows.
172	9	"The Robot Wore Pink"	Marc Daniels	Peter Noah	December 18, 1983	185212
When Alice quits, Mel replaces her with a robot that wins the customers' approval.
173	10	"'Tis the Season to Be Jealous"	Don Corbin & Linda Lavin	Bob Bendetson & Howard Bendetson	December 25, 1983	185214
Vera's former boyfriend Steve (Kip Niven) stops by the diner and sparks Elliot's jealousy.
174	11	"Tommy Goes Overboard"	Oz Scott	Nick Gore & Jerry Jacobius	January 1, 1984	185201
Tommy's home from college feeling down due to bad grades and a failed romance. Mel gets a visit from his old Navy buddy Frank (Donnelly Rhodes), a recruiter who ends up inspiring Tommy to consider joining the Navy, which Alice isn't too thrilled about.
175	12	"Vera, the Horse Thief"	John Pasquin	Bob Bendetson & Howard Bendetson	January 8, 1984	185202
Vera kidnaps a circus horse when she believes it is being mistreated by its owner (Robert Englund).
176	13	"Jolene Throws a Curve"	Marc Daniels	Sid Dorfman & Harvey Weitzman	January 15, 1984	185213
Jolene's loyalty is put to the test when she pitches for the diner's softball team.
177	14	"Lies My Mother Told Me"	Marc Daniels	Sid Dorfman & Harvey Weitzman	January 29, 1984	185216
Mel's enraged when he learns that his mother Carrie told a white lie about his childhood pet.
178	15	"Alice and the Devoted Dentist"	Marc Daniels	Duncan Scott McGibbon	February 12, 1984	185209
Mel's dentist (James Coco) falls for Alice when she goes to have a chipped tooth repaired.
179	16	"Alice's Hot Air Romance"	Marc Daniels	Michael Cassutt	March 4, 1984	185220
Alice's date with Zack (Jed Allan), a balloonist friend of Mel's, gets out of hand when she and the gang become trapped in a runaway balloon.
180	17	"Dollars to Donuts"	Oz Scott	David Silverman & Stephen Sustarsic	March 11, 1984	185207
Tommy catches gambling fever when Mel's mother takes him to the race track. Note: Vic Tayback does not appear in this episode.
181	18	"My Dinner with Debbie"	Marc Daniels	Mark Egan & Mark Solomon	March 18, 1984	185218
Ms. Walden (Linda Lavin in dual role), Vera and Elliott's landlady, falls in love with Mel after she invites him to her apartment for dinner.
182	19	"Vera's Fine Feathered Friends"	Marc Daniels	David Silverman & Stephen Sustarsic	March 25, 1984	185215
Vera ends up in the hospital when she attempts to save some baby birds.
183	20	"Jolene is Stuck on Mel"	Don Corvan & Linda Lavin	Gail Honigberg	April 1, 1984	185219
Jolene's whirlwind plans to marry a TV game show host come unglued when she becomes stuck to Mel, which may threaten her impending nuptials, as she then begins to have second thoughts.
184	21	"Don't Play it Again, Elliott"	Marc Daniels & Nancy Walker	Larry Balmagia	April 15, 1984	185221
Elliott ignores an already annoyed Vera when he becomes glued to the piano that his parents give them as a wedding gift all day and night, as he then tries to play it for his friends.
185	22	"Mel Spins His Wheels"	Marc Daniels	Richard Marcus & Michael Poryes	May 13, 1984	185217
Mel has always disliked the idea of providing handicap access, until he ends up in a wheelchair himself with two sprained ankles.
186	23	"Be It Ever So Crowded"	Marc Daniels	David Silverman & Stephen Sustarsic	May 20, 1984	185222
Vera and Elliott buy a charming old house that comes complete with fireplace, furniture, antiques and a boarder, Rev. Bragg, the forgetful old minister who married them. Vera and Elliot soon must work up the nerve to kick him out.

== Broadcast history ==
Alice began the season airing Sunday nights at 8:00-8:30 pm (EST) from October 6 to October 2, 1983, before being moved to the 9:30-10:00 pm (EST) time slot on February 12, 1984, where it remained for the remainder of the TV season.
