= Susan Skipper =

British actress

- Born: Susan Gwendoline Mary Cook; 27 January 1951 (age 75); Heston, Middlesex, England
- Education: Central School of Speech and Drama
- Occupation: Actress
- Years active: 1973 - Present
- Spouses: Anthony Valentine (m. 1982–2015)

Susan Valentine (born 27 January 1951 in [Heston, Middlesex, London]), known until 2015 as Susan Skipper, currently works as Susan Valentine. She is a British television, film, and stage actress. She is best known for playing the parts of Victoria Bourne in The Cedar Tree, and Madeleine in Don't Wait Up, on British television. She is the widow of Anthony Valentine, to whom she was married for 33 years.

After attending the Central School of Speech and Drama in London. Susan started her career on British Television, playing a variety of roles in both comedy and drama productions. She has also played numerous roles in the Theatre. She played Constance in the restoration comedy, She Stoops to Conquer at Greenwich Theatre. Susan has also worked in numerous theatre roles at the Mill Theatre Sonning where she played e.g. the role of Pat Cooper directed by the late Alvin Rakoff, in the Terence Rattigan play Separate Tables.

Susan was the first female voice of Sat-nav.

In the 1981 Granada Television series Lady Killers she played Mrs. Frances True. In 1982, Susan married the British actor Anthony Valentine, with whom she appeared in the first episode of Raffles (TV series) in 1976; Anthony starred as Raffles. Three years later Anthony and Susan met again in 1978, on Cecil Clark's ATV Elstree production of Ivor Novello's "The Dancing Years". Anthony played Rudi Kleber and Susan played Grete Schone. Anthony died on 2 December 2015. It was after Anthony's death in 2015, that Susan decided to continue her work, but using her married name of Susan Valentine in memory of her late husband Anthony.
