= Bootleg (TV series) =

- Genre: Drama
- Written by: Alex Shearer; Paul Smith
- Directed by: Ian Gilmour
- Starring: Steven Geller; Gemma Jones; Anthony Hammer; Martin Jarvis; Greg Saunders
- Country of origin: United Kingdom
- Original language: English
- No. of seasons: 1
- No. of episodes: 3

Original release
- Network: BBC One
- Release: 8 December – 22 December 2002

Bootleg is a 2002 serial for children, commissioned by the BBC and based on a book of the same name by Alex Shearer. It was shown as a three-part series in the UK, with subsequent broadcasts in Australia and all over the world.

The novel has been adapted in Japan in the form of manga and 13 episode ONA series under the title Chocolate Underground (チョコレート・アンダーグラウンド, Chokorēto Andāguraundo).

== Plot ==
The film is about a new political party called the "Good for You" (abbreviated as GFY) which comes into power and bans chocolate. Two kids named Smudger Moore and Huntley Hunter want to get their chocolate back. They begin by selling bootleg chocolate, and go on to join an underground resistance organization.

The film climaxes in a huge revolution where people take to the streets. They demand that chocolate be brought back, and that the government be overthrown.

It tells us about how they face ups and downs on their way.

== Media ==
=== Book ===
Bootleg was first published as a book written by Alex Shearer and is published by Macmillan Children's Books on 4 July 2003.

=== TV series ===
The adaptation, commissioned by BBC was made into a three-part series and was first broadcast in the United Kingdom and later in Australia.

It has won a British Academy of Film and Television Arts Award for Best Children's Drama, with the screenplay written by Paul Smith.

==== Cast ====
- Martin Jarvis
- Steven Geller
- Gemma Jones
- Louise Siversen as Mrs Spring
- Tim Robertson as Prime Minister Tom Turner
- Damien Bodie as Frankie Crawley
- Tony Rickards as Fishy Brian

=== Manga ===
The manga adaptation was done by Japanese manga artist, Aiji Yamakawa. It was serialized in Shueisha's shōjo monthly manga magazine, Bessatsu Margaret from its 2nd issue and ended on the 15th issue of the magazine in the year 2008.

It has only one volume and was released in October 2008.

=== Anime ===
The anime adaptation of the manga is written by Kiyoko Yoshimura and animated by Production I.G with original character designs provided by Aiji Yamakawa. voice actor Fumie Mizusawa and Toshiyuki Toyonaga voices the main characters, Smudger Moore and Huntley Hunter respectively and Japanese singer, Maaya Sakamoto voicing Carol Hunter.

The adaptation's theme song and insert song are sung by Kana Nishino. The theme song's title is Make Up and the insert song is titled as Kirari and is released under SME Records.

==== Cast ====
- Smudger Moore – Fumie Mizusawa
- Huntley Hunter – Toshiyuki Toyonaga
- Louise Bubby – Mikako Takahashi
- Director of Headquarters – Katsuyuki Konishi
- Ron Moore – Keiji Fujiwara
- Joe Crawley – Kenjirō Tsuda
- Carol Hunter – Maaya Sakamoto
- Kylie Moore – Rie Nakagawa
- John Blades – Tatsuhisa Suzuki
