= Desperados (TV series) =

British children's television series

- Desperados logo
- Created by: Paul Smith
- Starring: Ade Adepitan; David Proud
- Country of origin: United Kingdom
- No. of episodes: 10

Production
- Producer: Ewan Marshall
- Running time: 30 minutes

Original release
- Network: CBBC, BBC One
- Release: 31 January – 30 March 2007

Desperados is a British children's drama series, created and written for CBBC by Paul Smith in 2007, which depicts a wheelchair basketball team. The focus is on the journey of former footballer Charlie who, following a disabling accident on the pitch caused by his friend and team-mate Aidan, finds new meaning and purpose in his life when he joins a team called the Desperados.

Team coach Baggy Awolowo is searching for new players for a junior wheelchair basketball team. He says "You might think this is a basketball team. You're wrong, it's a way of life". Baggy later invites Aidan to joins the Desperados as their only non-disabled player, having been impressed by Aidan's shooting a perfect basket in the gym one day after practice.

There is plenty of drama off the basketball court as well as on it – involving such things as the players' different and sometimes turbulent home lives; Charlie patching up his friendship with Aidan; the players raising money by going street collecting, as well as demonstrating their basketball skills, in order to raise money to keep their team mini-bus on the road so they can continue to travel to away venues and avoid being dropped from the league; and prejudice against disabled people, as is shown when Vicky and Gabby encounter an abusive drunk man at the hotel where the team are staying on the night of an important league away match (the girls give as good as they get by Gabby blasting the man with a fire extinguisher, the girls claiming innocence when the manager arrives, and the drunk being ejected from the premises). The team also have to cope with the sudden and unexpected tragedy of losing their team-mate and captain Adam, who was in hospital having a heart-valve operation and failed to pull through.

The series was originally broadcast on the CBBC Channel on Wednesdays at 5.30pm. It was shown daily on BBC One from 14 August 2007 at 4.05pm.

BBC Director-General Mark Thompson has stated that Desperados was "hugely important" for the corporation.

== Cast ==
- Baggy – Ade Adepitan
- Adam – Ben Warren
- Charlie – David Proud
- Kyle – Reece Pantry
- Gabby – Laurie Williams
- Aidan – Cole Edwards
- Shelly – Zoe Giannasi
- Vicky – Sarah Kelly
- Sam – Richard Sargent
