= One Night (British TV series) =

- Written by: Paul Smith
- Directed by: David Evans
- Country of origin: United Kingdom
- Original language: English
- No. of series: 1
- No. of episodes: 4

Production
- Producer: Ewan Marshall
- Running time: 60 mins

Original release
- Network: BBC One
- Release: 26 March 2012

One Night is a British 2012 drama series broadcast on BBC One, about four people linked by an event in their local area. Classical singer Errollyn Wallen provides the opening and closing theme to each episode with her song "Daedalus".

Cast list: Billy Matthews (Alfie), Jessica Hynes (Carol), Georgina Campbell (Rochelle), Douglas Hodge (Ted)

== Filming locations ==
Filmed on location around Hackney in London. The fictional Lakemead estate is actually the De Beauvoir estate in Hackney. The scenes at Ted's home were shot in Haggerston Road, Dalston, London. The scenes at the Co-op shop where Carol works were shot in Wrythe Lane, Rosehill, London. The scenes in the street where Rochelle meets Sami were filmed in King Street, Southall. The scenes at the nightclub Alfie enters were shot in The Broadway, Mill Hill. The store where Alfie shoplifts is in Kingsland Road, Dalston. The Pub where Carol performs her stand-up act is the Sir Richard Steele in Haverstock Hill, London.

== Episodes ==
Episode	Title	Original air date	Summary
1	Ted	26 March 2012	Ted believes the attacks he is suffering are in revenge for him admonishing a teenage girl
2	Rochelle	27 March 2012	The funeral of Danny, who was killed by a rival gang
3	Carol	28 March 2012	Carol intends to fulfil her ambition
4	Alfie	30 March 2012	13-year-old Alfie faces an initiation test to join the gang who rule the neighbourhood

The series was repeated on the London Live television channel in September 2014.
