= Alice season 4 =

Alice
- Season 4
- No. of episodes: 24

Release
- Original network: CBS
- Original release: September 23, 1979 – April 6, 1980

Season chronology
- ← Previous; Season 3 Next → Season 5

This is a list of episodes for the fourth season of the CBS-TV series Alice.

== Broadcast history ==
The season originally aired Sundays at 9:00-9:30 pm (EST).

== Episodes ==
No. overall	No. in season	Title	Directed by	Written by	Original release date	Prod. code
73	1	"Has Anyone Here Seen Telly?"	Marc Daniels	Tom Whedon & Charles Isaacs and Robert Fisher & Arthur Marx	September 23, 1979	166936
Vera quits when no one believes that Telly Savalas was in the diner.
74	2	"Mona Lisa Alice"	Marc Daniels	Tom Whedon & Charles Isaacs	September 30, 1979	166932
Mel wants the waitresses to smile in order for customers to pay, but Alice is feeling sour over Tommy's matchmaking.
75	3	"Mel Loves Marie"	Marc Daniels	Robert Fisher & Arthur Marx	October 7, 1979	166931
Mel gets engaged to a woman named Marie, then insists that she sign a pre-nup.
76	4	"Vera Robs the Cradle"	Marc Daniels	Robert Fisher & Arthur Marx	October 21, 1979	166933
Tommy falls for Vera as she teaches him how to dance.
77	5	"Flo's Chili Reception"	Marc Daniels	Robert Fisher & Arthur Marx	October 28, 1979	166934
Mel's rival courts Flo to get his chili recipe.
78	6	"Little Alice Bluenose"	Marc Daniels	Tom Whedon & Charles Isaacs	November 4, 1979	166937
Vera's boyfriend objects to her sketches of nude males in art class.
79	7	"Carrie Sharples Strikes Again"	Lee Lochhead	Robert Fisher & Arthur Marx	November 11, 1979	166940
Mel's domineering mother (Martha Raye) returns.
80	8	"Mel's in the Kitchen with Dinah"	Norman Abbott	Tom Whedon & Charles Isaacs	November 18, 1979	166938
Dinah Shore invites Mel to cook his chili on her show, but he can only bring one waitress with him.
81	9	"Cabin Fever"	Marc Daniels	Thad Mumford & Dan Wilcox	December 2, 1979	166935
Mel, his girlfriend and the waitresses spend the weekend stuck together in the same fishing cabin.
82	10	"My Cousin, Art Carney"	Lee Lochhead	Robert Fisher & Arthur Marx and Tom Whedon & Charles Isaacs	December 9, 1979	166942
Vera asks her distant relative Art Carney to endorse Mel's chili so it can be on the market as a frozen product called "Chili con Carney".
83	11	"Mel, the Magi"	Marc Daniels	Mark Egan & Mark Solomon	December 23, 1979	166945
The waitresses chip in their meager resources to celebrate Christmas at the diner.
84	12	"Good Buddy Flo"	Marc Daniels	Linda Morris & Vic Rauseo	January 6, 1980	166943
Flo learns how to drive a truck when she learns her boyfriend has a female partner.
85	13	"Alice in TV Land"	Norman Abbott	Robert Fisher & Arthur Marx	January 13, 1980	166939
Tommy causes trouble on TV when he gossips about the staff of Mel's Diner on a talk show. Guest star Eve Arden.
86	14	"Alice Beats the Clock"	Marc Daniels	Katherine Green	January 27, 1980	166946
When Mel installs a new time clock, the waitresses demand overtime for the Sunday cleanup they used to do at no extra charge.
87	15	"Carrie's Wedding"	Gary Shimokawa	Mark Egan & Mark Solomon	February 3, 1980	166941
Mel is happy for his mother getting remarried until he sees the man who will be his stepfather.
88	16	"My Funny Valentine Tux"	Marc Daniels	Tom Whedon & Charles Isaacs	February 10, 1980	166947
Tommy needs a tuxedo for a Valentine's Day dance with his date, Wanda (Kelly Parsons).
89	17	"Auld Acquaintances Should Be Forgot"	Marc Daniels	Robert Fisher & Arthur Marx	February 17, 1980	166944
Mel takes in a friend whose wife has just left him.
90	18	"Flo's Farewell"	Marc Daniels	Robert Fisher & Arthur Marx	February 24, 1980	166948
Flo says goodbye to Mel's when she takes a job offer from a wealthy Houston restaurateur. This episode sets up the spin-off series Flo, which premiered the following month. Note: Polly Holliday's last episode.
91	19	"For Whom the Belle Toils"	Marc Daniels	Linda Morris & Vic Rauseo	March 2, 1980	166949
Mel hires a new waitress from Mississippi named Belle, who has dreams of being a country-music writer. Note: Diane Ladd's first episode. Ladd, starred as Flo in Alice Doesn't Live Here Anymore
92	20	"One Too Many Girls"	Marc Daniels	Robert Fisher & Arthur Marx	March 9, 1980	166950
Although Belle is getting along fine with Mel, she's not doing so well with Alice and Vera.
93	21	"Vera, the Vamp"	Linda Lavin and Lee Lochhead	Linda Morris & Vic Rauseo	March 16, 1980	166951
Vera asks Belle to help make her be more attractive to men.
94	22	"Profit Without Honor"	Lee Lochhead	Robert Fisher & Arthur Marx	March 23, 1980	166952
Mel discovers how much he'll get for letting the city condemn his property when he signs an agreement to share his profits with the women.
95	23	"Cook's Tour"	Linda Lavin and Lee Lochhead	Linda Morris & Vic Rauseo	March 30, 1980	166953
A tour guide (Pamela Myers) steers business towards the diner out of love for Mel.
96	24	"Here Comes Alice Cottontail"	Marc Daniels	Robert Fisher & Arthur Marx	April 6, 1980	166954
Alice bets that Mel will kick Tommy out, while Mel bets she will be snooping to check up on her son.
