= Alice season 9 =

Alice
- Season 9
- No. of episodes: 16

Release
- Original network: CBS
- Original release: October 14, 1984 – March 19, 1985

Season chronology
- ← Previous; Season 8

This is a list of episodes from the ninth and final season of Alice.

== Starring ==
Linda Lavin as Alice Hyatt, Vic Tayback as Mel Sharples, Beth Howland as Vera Louise Gorman Novak, Phillip McKeon as Tommy Hyatt, Charles Levin as Elliott Novak and Celia Weston as Jolene Hunnicutt

== Episodes ==
No. overall	No. in season	Title	Directed by	Written by	Original release date	Prod. code
187	1	"Romancing Mister Stone"	Marc Daniels	Cindy Begel & Lesa Kite	October 14, 1984	185574
Jolene and Vera try to help Alice's love life by placing an ad in the personals.
188	2	"Space Sharples"	Marc Daniels	Bob Bendetson & Howard Bendetson	October 28, 1984	185577
Mel thwarts a bank robbery while dressed up as Captain Galaxy for Halloween. He is hailed as a hero, and soon takes to dressing as the hero everyday.
189	3	"Big, Bad Mel"	Marc Daniels	David Silverman & Stephen Sustarsic	November 4, 1984	185571
Mel buys a nursery school and plans to tear it down to make a parking lot. Guest star: Rue McClanahan
190	4	"Houseful of Hunnicutts"	Don Corvan	Lisa A. Bannick & Jack Carrerow	November 18, 1984	185576
Jolene gets a visit from her father Big Jake (Gregory Walcott), five brothers, grandmother, and the family dog, all staying in her small apartment. She turns to Alice for advice on how to get them to leave.
191	5	"Tommy's Lost Weekend"	Marc Daniels	Story by : Arnold Schmidt; Teleplay by : Bob Bendetson & Howard Bendetson	November 25, 1984	185578
Alice becomes concerned that Tommy has a drinking problem after he comes home with a Mohawk and a hazy memory of the night.
192	6	"Undercover Mel"	Marc Daniels	Linda Morris & Vic Rauseo	December 16, 1984	185580
Elliot and Officer Maxwell enlist Mel's help as a decoy as they try to catch cattle rustlers. The waitresses may ruin the mission as they try to help Mel.
193	7	"Footloose Mel"	Lee Shallat Chemel	Bob Bendetson & Howard Bendetson	December 23, 1984	185573
Mel offers the use of his diner for a planned locally televised performance by a dance group. When he kicks a group of "hoodlums" out of the diner, not realizing that they were the dancers, he now must try to get them to come back to the diner to perform.
194	8	"Vera's Anniversary Blues"	Don Corvan	Lisa A. Bannick & Jack Carrerow	January 8, 1985	185579
Vera and Elliot's first wedding anniversary takes an unexpected turn when she's arrested.
195	9	"Kiss the Grill Goodbye"	Nancy Walker	Cindy Begel & Lesa Kite	January 15, 1985	185582
Mel is forced to close the diner when a new restaurant opens up down the street.
196	10	"Vera, the Nightbird"	Don Corvan	Linda Morris & Vic Rauseo	January 22, 1985	185581
Vera, trying to save up enough money for a video camera for Elliot's birthday, lands a second job as a nighttime radio disc jockey named "Nightbird", who turns on all the men in Phoenix, including Mel, who's in for a surprise when he finds out the sultry female DJ's identity.
197	11	"Alice Doesn't Work Here Anymore: Part 1"	Don Corvan	David Silverman & Stephen Sustarsic	January 29, 1985	185583
Travis Marsh (Kip Niven), a famous country-music singer, who's a cousin of Vera's ex-fiance Steve, asks Alice to join him on his tour. Part 1 of two-part story.
198	12	"Alice Doesn't Work Here Anymore: Part 2"	Don Corvan	Story by : Mark Solomon & Mark Egan; Teleplay by : Bob Bendetson & Howard Bendetson	February 5, 1985	185584
Country music singer Travis Marsh and her writer boyfriend Nick (Michael Durrell) compete for Alice's affection as Travis whisks her off with him to go on tour in the Southwest as she finds that she still has some unfinished business to take care of in Phoenix. Part 2 and conclusion of two-part story.
199	13	"The Night They Raided Debbie's"	Nancy Walker	Mark Egan & Mark Solomon	February 6, 1985	185575
Vera and Elliot rent their spare room to Ms. Walden (Linda Lavin in dual role), their tyrannical one-time landlady.
200	14	"One on One"	Don Corvan	Linda Morris & Vic Rauseo	March 5, 1985	185585
Mel offers to train Jolene when she decides to try out for a spot on a women's basketball team.
201	15	"Vera's Grounded Gumshoe"	Marc Daniels	Cindy Begel & Lesa Kite	March 12, 1985	185572
Elliot quits the police force after he accidentally shoots himself. After trying different jobs, when he tries to settle on being a stay-at-home "house husband", his puttering around the house begins to drive Vera up the wall.
202	16	"Th-th-th-that's All, Folks"	Don Corvan	Bob Carroll Jr. & Madelyn Davis	March 19, 1985	185586
Season and series finale: Vera announces she's pregnant as husband Elliot gets promoted to police detective, Jolene decides to open a beauty shop, and Alice sets off to be a singer. Mel is offered a bundle from a land developer to sell the diner and he decides to jump at the chance, even though Mel's Diner will be demolished. After the diner is sold, in a series of flashbacks the characters reflect on old times.

== Broadcast history ==
Alice began the season airing Sunday nights at 9:30-10:00 pm (EST) on October 14, 1984, before it was moved to the 8:30-9:00 pm (EST) Tuesday night time slot on January 8, 1985, where it remained through February 5. In airing a two-part episode story, it also aired the next evening, Wednesday February 6, before returning to its Tuesday night timeslot, where it remained for the remainder of the TV season.
