= The Complete Guide to Parenting =

British television series

The Complete Guide to Parenting is a British television comedy drama series broadcast on ITV in 2006. Created and written by Paul Smith, the series stars Peter Davison as George Huntley, Professor of Child Psychology at London University, best-selling author of Hey Mum & Dad, Get Your Act Together and LBC resident parenting guru. He finds this purported parenting expertise put to the test, when his wife Phoebe (Josie Lawrence) takes a job based in Paris. George has to hold the fort and look after his 7-year-old son Jamie (Noah Hedges), for the very first time, whilst juggling the rest of his busy life.

Whilst scenes are filmed at UCL, which is one of the universities that make up the University of London, it is unclear whether this show's 'London University' is meant to be the University of London.
