= Alice season 7 =

Alice
- Season 7
- No. of episodes: 23

Release
- Original network: CBS
- Original release: October 6, 1982 – September 18, 1983

Season chronology
- ← Previous; Season 6 Next → Season 8

This is a list of episodes from the seventh season of Alice.

== Episodes ==
No. overall	No. in season	Title	Directed by	Written by	Original release date	Prod. code
141	1	"Sorry, Wrong Lips"	Mel Ferber	Howard Liebling & Lloyd Turner	October 6, 1982	167625
Mel believes he's the "best kisser" described in an actress's (special guest star Debbie Reynolds) memoirs.
142	2	"Do You Take This Waitress?"	Christine Ballard & Linda Lavin	Gail Honigberg	October 13, 1982	167478
Jolene's bribed into pretending she's Mel's girlfriend when one of his old pals arrives for a visit and Mel wants to show off.
143	3	"The Secret of Mel's Diner"	Marc Daniels	Chet Dowling & Sandy Krinski	October 20, 1982	167484
Mel and the girls believe that buried treasure lies somewhere in the diner and they set out to find it.
144	4	"Alice at the Palace"	Marc Daniels	Mark Egan & Mark Solomon	October 27, 1982	167621
Mel invests his track winnings in a musical starring Alice, and fires the show's star, Joel Grey, who guest-stars.
145	5	"Joel Grey Saves the Day"	Marc Daniels	Mark Egan & Mark Solomon	November 3, 1982	167622
Mel's musical gets less than rave reviews on opening night and the only person who can revive it is Joel Grey (who again guest-stars).
146	6	"Alice's Turkey of a Thanksgiving"	Mel Ferber	Gail Honigberg	November 10, 1982	167630
Alice's Thanksgiving turns into a disaster when her meddlesome, bossy mother (Doris Roberts) arrives for a week's visit with an upsetting announcement.
147	7	"Carrie on the Rebound"	Marc Daniels	Bob Bendetson & Howard Bendetson	January 9, 1983	167628
Mel's newly divorced mother Carrie (Martha Raye) arrives for a visit and falls for Earl.
148	8	"Jolene's Brother Jonas"	John Pasquin	David Silverman & Stephen Sustarsic	January 16, 1983	167626
Jolene thinks her brother Jonas (Guich Koock) is up to one of his schemes when he sells Mel a worm farm.
149	9	"Alice Sees the Light"	Marc Daniels	Bob Bendetson & Howard Bendetson	February 28, 1983	167637
Mel's Diner suddenly becomes popular after Alice spots a UFO.
150	10	"Vera the Virtuoso"	Linda Lavin & John Pasquin	Robert Getchell & David Silverman & Stephen Sustarsic	March 7, 1983	167634
Vera's debut as a cello player in a string quartet doesn't end on a melodic note.
151	11	"Alice Faces the Music"	Marc Daniels & Vic Tayback	Robert Getchell & David Silverman & Stephen Sustarsic	March 14, 1983	167639
Alice's compassionate nature is tested when she competes against Jolene and Vera on a game show.
152	12	"Tommy, the Jailbird"	Mel Ferber	Robert Getchell & David Silverman & Stephen Sustarsic	March 21, 1983	167631
Tommy finds himself on the other side of the law when he and a college pal indulge in some wild reveling.
153	13	"Jolene and the Night Watchman"	John Pasquin	Bob Bendetson & Howard Bendetson	March 28, 1983	167641
When Artie (Tony Longo), a muscle-bound watchman who happens to be a regular customer at Mel's Diner, saves Jolene's life after she's almost run down by a car, he now believes that she's his girlfriend.
154	14	"Mel's Dream Car"	John Pasquin	Barry Gold	April 11, 1983	167627
It's not a smooth ride for Mel when he learns that his prized car has been stolen.
155	15	"Come Back Little Sharples"	Mel Ferber	Gail Honigberg	April 17, 1983	167638
Mel locks himself in his apartment when everyone—including his mother—starts to bother him.
156	16	"Vera, The Torch"	John Pasquin	Mark Egan & Mark Solomon	April 24, 1983	167642
Vera believes she's responsible for the fire that swept through her landlord's apartment.
157	17	"The Grass is Always Greener"	Marc Daniels	Linda Morris & Vic Rauseo	May 1, 1983	167629
Mel sells the diner to the girls when he decides to accept an irresistible job offer.
158	18	"Tommy Fouls Out"	Marc Daniels	Michael Cassutt & Lew Levy	May 15, 1983	167623
Tommy's about to hang up his basketball uniform and forfeit his college scholarship. Guest star: Meadowlark Lemon.
159	19	"Vera on the Lam"	Marc Daniels	Barry Gold	May 22, 1983	167632
Vera has a few confessions to make when Mel decides to have the waitresses bonded.
160	20	"Mel's Cousin Wendy?"	John Pasquin	Linda Morris & Vic Rauseo	May 29, 1983	167640
Mel asks his cousin Wendell (David Rounds) for help in a crazy scheme to try to steal a "secret sauce" recipe from a competitor.
161	21	"Sweet Erasable Mel"	John Pasquin	Betty Yahr	June 5, 1983	167635
Mel's headed for trouble when he buys a computer to handle his bookkeeping tasks after Vera accidentally erases Mel's total existence while using it.
162	22	"Tommy Hyatt, Business Consultant"	Mel Ferber	Bob Bendetson & Howard Bendetson	June 12, 1983	167633
Alice almost loses her job when Tommy gives Mel some marketing tips.
163	23	"Jolene Lets the Cat Out of the Bag"	Don Corvan & Linda Lavin	Gail Honigberg	September 18, 1983	167636
Jolene's glad she learned self-defense from Vera when a cat burglar starts roaming the neighborhood.

== Broadcast history ==
The season was aired Wednesday nights at 9:00-9:30 pm (EST) from October 6 to November 10, 1982, before being moved to Sunday nights at 9:30-10:00 pm (EST) where it aired on January 9 and January 16, 1983 before being switched to Mondays at 9:00-9:30pm (EST). It was again moved to Sunday nights at 9:30-10-00 pm (EST) on May 1, 1983 before the airing time was switched to 8:00-8:30 pm (EST) on Sundays on September 18, 1983.
