= Alice season 5 =

Alice
- Season 5
- No. of episodes: 20

Release
- Original network: CBS
- Original release: November 2, 1980 – May 3, 1981

Season chronology
- ← Previous; Season 4 Next → Season 6

This is a list of episodes from the fifth season of Alice.

== Episodes ==
No. overall	No. in season	Title	Directed by	Written by	Original release date	Prod. code
97	1	"Mel and the Green Machine"	Lee Lochhead	Linda Morris & Vic Rauseo	November 2, 1980	167201
Alice becomes Mel's conscience when he accidentally receives thousands of dollars from an automatic teller.
98	2	"Dog Day Evening"	Marc Daniels	George Arthur Bloom	November 9, 1980	167202
The staff is trapped in the diner with two guard dogs.
99	3	"Hello Vegas, Goodbye Diner"	Marc Daniels	Mark Egan & Mark Solomon (part 1)	November 16, 1980	167203–167204
100	4	"Hello Vegas, Goodbye Diner"	Marc Daniels	Linda Morris & Vic Rauseo (part 2)	November 16, 1980	167203–167204
Mel announces to the waitresses that he has gambled away the diner. Mel can get his diner back if he can convince Robert Goulet to perform at a run-down Vegas motel.
101	5	"Vera's Aunt Agatha"	Marc Daniels	Bob Fisher & Arthur Marx	November 23, 1980	167205
Mel ruins Vera's plans to take off for Mexico with her free-spirited aunt (Mildred Natwick).
102	6	"Tommy's TKO"	Marc Daniels	Linda Morris & Vic Rauseo	November 30, 1980	167206
Tommy is dismissed from school after Mel shows him how to fight.
103	7	"The New Improved Mel"	Marc Daniels	Mark Egan & Mark Solomon	December 7, 1980	167207
Mel turns over a new leaf after attending an old Navy buddy's funeral.
104	8	"Carrie Sings the Blues"	Christine Ballard & Linda Lavin	Mark Egan & Mark Solomon	December 21, 1980	167208
Carrie's marriage is almost destroyed because of Mel's selfishness.
105	9	"Henry's Bitter Half"	Lee Lochhead	Mark Egan & Mark Solomon	January 4, 1981	167209
Henry's wife Chloe (special guest star Ruth Buzzi) has been extra nice to him making him think she is having an affair, so to get back at her he claims he is having an affair with Alice.
106	10	"Alice Locks Belle Out"	Nick Havinga	Bob Fisher & Arthur Marx	January 11, 1981	167210
Belle finds herself out on the doorstep until Alice's "Sam Butler" saves the day.
107	11	"Vera Goes Out on a Limb"	Marc Daniels	Linda Morris & Vic Rauseo	January 18, 1981	167211
Vera chains herself to the limb of a tree to keep it from being chopped down.
108	12	"The Jerry Reed Fish Story"	Marc Daniels	Bob Fisher & Arthur Marx	February 1, 1981	167214
Returning from a fishing trip with Charlie and Jerry Reed (in a return guest appearance), Mel's chance to meet Dolly Parton is almost ruined by a fish which was caught by Jerry, that the waitresses found in the refrigerator, and then cut up, not aware of whose it is.
109	13	"Bye Bye, Birdie"	Marc Daniels	George Arthur Bloom	February 8, 1981	167213
Vera is finally able to pay for her pet parrot, Birdie. When Birdie imitates everything Mel says, Mel yells and the parrot dies.
110	14	"Alice's Son, the Drop-Out"	Marc Daniels	Bob Fisher & Arthur Marx	February 15, 1981	167212
Exhausted from working a night job, Tommy misses his first college class.
111	15	"Carrie Chickens Out"	Marc Daniels	Bob Fisher & Arthur Marx	February 22, 1981	167215
Mel comes to work one day and is surprised to find his mother Carrie has come to town for another visit. She quickly takes over the diner and starts running the kitchen herself.
112	16	"Macho, Macho Mel"	Marc Daniels	Mark Egan & Mark Solomon	March 8, 1981	167216
While taking out the garbage, Mel has an encounter with a little old lady who catches him by surprise when she mugs him. However, when Mel recounts the story, she suddenly becomes four thugs. Mel quickly eats his words when the she is captured.
113	17	"The Great Escape"	Marc Daniels	Vic Rauseo & Linda Morris and Mark Egan & Mark Solomon	March 15, 1981	167217
A cross-country trucker's former partner (Celia Weston) gets a waitressing job at the diner. Note: Diane Ladd's last episode.
114	18	"Alice Strikes Up the Band"	Marc Daniels	Mark Egan & Mark Solomon	March 29, 1981	167218
Alice's success as a substitute singer with a band forces her into a tough decision.
115	19	"Who's Kissing the Great Chef of Phoenix?"	Marc Daniels	Bob Fisher & Arthur Marx	April 5, 1981	167219
Mel kisses Vera, Vera takes the kiss seriously, not realizing it was just a ploy to make his girlfriend Marie jealous.
116	20	"Baby Makes Five"	Christine Ballard & Linda Lavin	Charles Isaacs & Tom Whedon	May 3, 1981	167220
Vera finds an abandoned baby and soon becomes attached, refusing to give up the baby girl. She looks into adopting her.

== Broadcast history ==
The season originally aired Sundays at 9:00-9:30 pm (EST).
