= Laurie Williams (wheelchair basketball) =

Wheelchair basketball player

Laurie Williams PLY
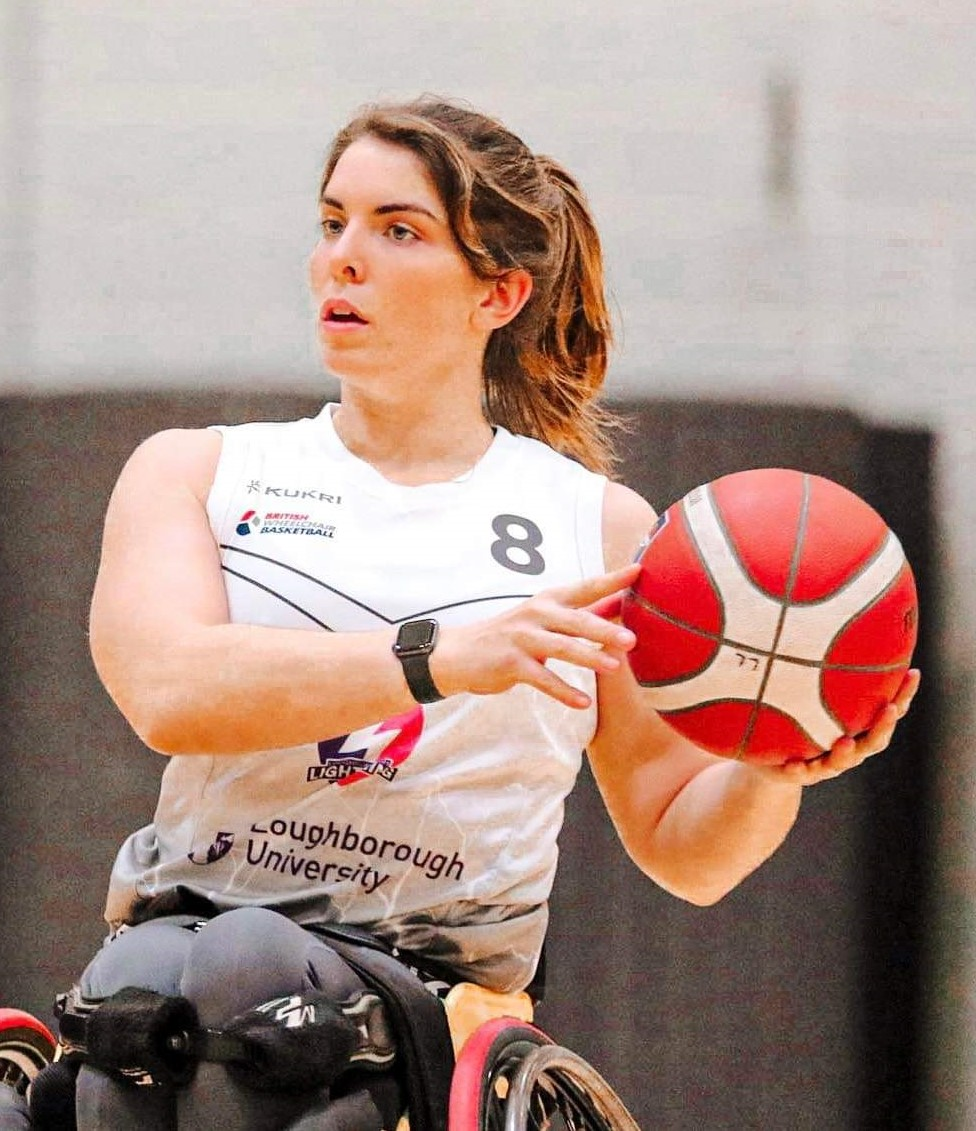

Personal information
- Nationality: United Kingdom; Ireland
- Born: 4 February 1992 (age 34) Manchester, England
- Height: 155 cm (5 ft 1 in)

Sport
- Country: Great Britain
- Sport: Wheelchair basketball
- Disability class: 2.5
- Event: Women's team
- College team: University of Alabama
- Club: Loughborough Lightning
Medal record
Women's wheelchair basketball
Representing Great Britain
World Championships
Silver medal – second place	2018 Hamburg	Team
U25 Women's World Championships
Gold medal – first place	2015 Beijing, China	Team
European Championships
Silver medal – second place	2019 Rotterdam	Team
Silver medal – second place	2023 Rotterdam	Team
Silver medal – second place	2025 Sarajevo	Team
Bronze medal – third place	2009 Stoke	Team
Bronze medal – third place	2011 Nazareth	Team
Bronze medal – third place	2013 Frankfurt	Team
Bronze medal – third place	2015 Worcester	Team

Laurie Anne Williams (born 4 February 1992) is a 2.5 point British-Irish wheelchair basketball player who participated at the 2012 Summer Paralympics in London, the 2016 Summer Paralympics in Rio de Janeiro, the 2020 Summer Paralympics in Tokyo and the 2024 Summer Paralympics in Paris representing Great Britain.

== Early life and education ==
Williams was born on 4 February 1992 at Wythenshawe Hospital and grew up in Altrincham. At the age of eighteen months, an undiagnosed viral infection resulted in her developing motor neuropathy in her trunk and legs.

Williams starred as Gabby alongside Ade Adepitan in the 2007 CBBC series, Desperados about a children's wheelchair basketball team.

She attended Altrincham Grammar School for Girls and later completed further education at Loreto College in Manchester. Following the completion of her A-Levels, Williams enrolled at Loughborough University and proceeded to graduate with a first class honours Bachelor of Science degree in social psychology.

Immediately following her studies at Loughborough, Williams pursued postgraduate education at the University of Alabama, graduating with a Master of Science degree in Human Development Studies.

== Sporting career ==
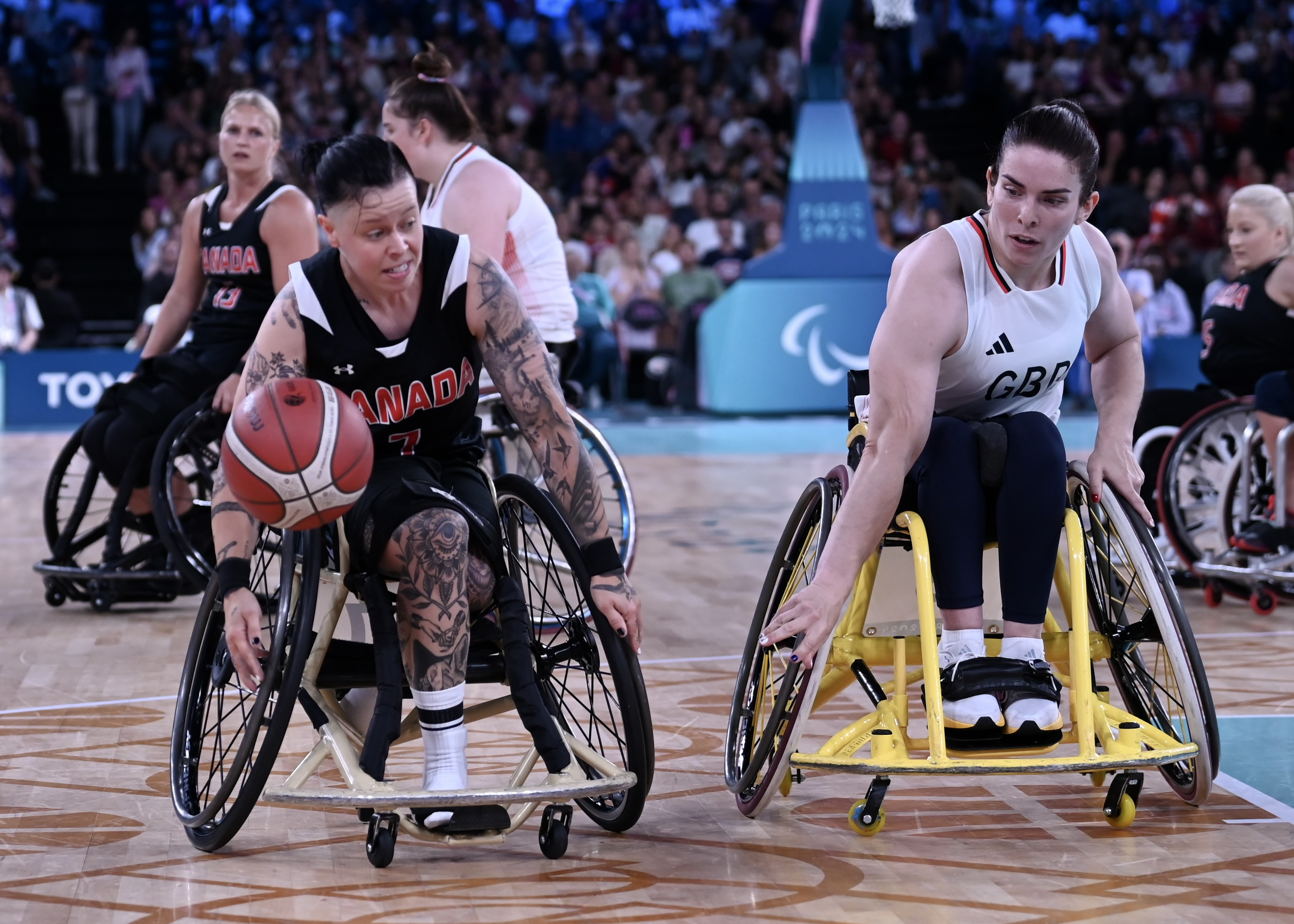
In action against Canada's Cindy Ouellet (left)

When she was 13, Williams began wheelchair athletics and wheelchair racing. While attending the Greater Manchester Youth Games in 2005, she was asked to try out for wheelchair basketball. She found that she loved the physicality of the game and the social aspects of being part of a team, and started playing competitively in 2008. Her team mates called her "whippet" on account of her speed on the basketball court. She played for the Nottingham Coyotes in the National League and is classified as a 2.5 point player.

In 2009 Williams made her debut with Team Great Britain at the 2009 BT Paralympic World Cup in Manchester, and in 2010 was part of the team that came sixth at the World Championships in Birmingham – Britain's best ever performance. She was then part of the team that won silver at the U22 European Championships in Italy later that year. She won bronze at the European Championships in Nazareth in 2011 and Frankfurt in 2013, and at the U25 World Championship in St. Catharines, Canada in 2011. She made her Paralympic debut in front of a home crowd at the 2012 Summer Paralympics in London.

Whilst studying at University of Alabama, Williams was part of the university wheelchair basketball team, and participated in their successfully winning their fourth national championship in seven years in 2015, with a 58–52 win over the University of Illinois.

In 2015 she was co-captain (with Amy Conroy) of the U25 team at the 2015 Women's U25 Wheelchair Basketball World Championship in Beijing, winning gold. She then played with the senior team that defeated France to take bronze in the 2015 European Championship. In May 2016, she was named as part of the team for the 2016 Summer Paralympics in Rio de Janeiro. The British team produced its best ever performance at the Paralympics, making it all the way to the semi-finals, but lost to the semi-final to the United States, and then the bronze medal match to the Netherlands.

Domestically, Williams presently plays as a member of the Loughborough Lightning women's wheelchair basketball team.

== Achievements ==
- 2009: Bronze at the European Championships (Stoke Mandeville, UK)
- 2010: Sixth at the World Wheelchair Basketball Championships (Birmingham, UK)
- 2011: Bronze at the European Championships (Nazareth, Israel)
- 2011: Bronze at the U25 Wheelchair Basketball World Championship (St. Catharines, Canada)
- 2012: Seventh at the 2012 Summer Paralympic Games (London, UK)
- 2013: Bronze at European Championships (Frankfurt, Germany)
- 2014: Fifth at the World Wheelchair Basketball Championship (Toronto, Canada)
- 2015: Gold at the 2015 Women's U25 Wheelchair Basketball World Championship (Beijing, China)
- 2015: Bronze at the European Championships (Worcester, England)
- 2016: Fourth at 2016 Paralympics (Rio de Janeiro, Brazil)
- 2017: Bronze at the European Championships (Tenerife, Spain)
- 2018: Silver at the World Wheelchair Basketball Championship (Hamburg, Germany)
- 2021: Seventh at 2020 Paralympics (Tokyo, Japan)
- 2024: Fifth at 2024 Paralympics (Paris, France)

== Personal life ==
Williams is openly lesbian. Williams is engaged to fellow wheelchair basketball player Robyn Love. They have a child together. She holds dual citizenship as an Irish national having inherited this from her mother's Irish citizenship.
