= Alice season 2 =

Alice
- Season 2
- No. of episodes: 24

Release
- Original network: CBS
- Original release: October 2, 1977 – April 9, 1978

Season chronology
- ← Previous; Season 1 Next → Season 3

This is a list of episodes for the second season of the CBS-TV series Alice.

== Broadcast history ==
The season originally aired Sundays at 9:30-10:30 pm (EST).

== Episodes ==
No. overall	No. in season	Title	Directed by	Written by	Original release date	Prod. code
25	1	"The Second Time 'Round"	Kim Friedman	Tom Whedon	October 2, 1977	166665
Flo's third ex-husband comes to the diner along with a suspected flasher.
26	2	"The Indian Taker"	Marc Daniels	Tom Whedon	October 9, 1977	166667
A Native American refuses to leave the diner because he believes it lies on sacred Indian ground.
27	3	"86 the Waitresses"	Marc Daniels	Sybil Adelman	October 23, 1977	166668
The waitresses quit when Mel gives a new waiter more money than them.
28	4	"Alice by Moonlight"	Kim Friedman	Tom Whedon	October 30, 1977	166669
Alice moonlights as a nightclub singer, which takes a toll on her waitressing job.
29	5	"Single Belles"	Kim Friedman	Bruce Howard	November 6, 1977	166670
The girls go to a singles bar.
30	6	"The Sixty Minutes Man"	Kim Friedman	Story by : George Tibbles; Teleplay by : George Tibbles, Warren S. Murray and Tom Whedon	November 13, 1977	166666
Alice suspects a customer (Michael V. Gazzo) of being a gangster.
31	7	"That Old Back Magic"	William Asher	Robert Fisher & Arthur Marx	December 4, 1977	166671
Mel is unable to move out of Alice's place when his bad back gets worse.
32	8	"Love Is Sweeping the Counter"	Kim Friedman	Arthur S. Rabin	December 11, 1977	166672
Flo and Mel's relationship improves after they go to an out-of-town game together.
33	9	"A Semi-Merry Christmas"	Marc Daniels	Madelyn Pugh Davis & Bob Carroll, Jr. and Tom Whedon	December 18, 1977	166674
Alice and the gang are snowbound on their way to spend Christmas with her cousin.
34	10	"Oh! George Burns"	Marc Daniels	Seaman Jacobs & Fred S. Fox	January 1, 1978	166675
When George Burns comes into Mel's, Vera thinks he's God after seeing the movie Oh, God!
35	11	"The Eyes of Texas"	Kim Friedman	Robert Fisher & Arthur Marx	January 8, 1978	166673
Flo refuses to get glasses even though she needs them.
36	12	"Love Is a Free Throw"	Marc Daniels	Robert Fisher & Arthur Marx	January 11, 1978	166676
A high-school basketball star develops a crush on Alice. First appearance of Marvin Kaplan as Henry
37	13	"Close Encounters of the Worst Kind"	William Asher	Robert Fisher & Arthur Marx	January 22, 1978	166677
Everyone gets hostile at Mel's when the workers express their petty grievances.
38	14	"The Pharmacist"	Noam Pitlik	Story by : Michael Loman; Teleplay by : Michael Loman and Chris Hayward	January 29, 1978	166661
A pharmacist (Bob Dishy) threatens to commit suicide in Mel's Diner as he protests against food additives.
39	15	"Love Me, Love My Horse"	William Asher	Tom Whedon	February 5, 1978	166678
Flo fixes Alice up with her cowboy brother.
40	16	"The Reporter"	Dennis Steinmetz	Michael Loman	February 12, 1978	166663
An investigative reporter (Richard Erdman) hides out in Mel's Diner.
41	17	"Florence of Arabia"	Kim Friedman	Tom Whedon	February 19, 1978	166680
Flo is courted by an Arab who already has three wives.
42	18	"The Cuban Connection"	William Asher	Robert Fisher & Arthur Marx	February 26, 1978	166681
Alice tries to settle an argument between a womanizing photographer (Desi Arnaz) and his fed-up wife (Janis Paige).
43	19	"Mel's Big Five-0"	William Asher	Warren S. Murray	March 5, 1978	166679
Mel insists he does not want a party for his fiftieth birthday.
44	20	"Don't Lock Now"	William Asher	Tom Whedon	March 12, 1978	166682
Someone's stealing food and making long-distance calls from the diner.
45	21	"The Star in the Storeroom"	Marc Daniels	Robert Fisher & Arthur Marx	March 19, 1978	166683
Flo is hounded for tickets to Jerry Reed's concert just because she was his babysitter.
46	22	"The Bus"	Marc Daniels	Story by : Chris Hayward; Teleplay by : Erik Tarloff	March 26, 1978	166664
The staff of Mel's Diner brace themselves for a busload of customers.
47	23	"Mel's Recession"	William Asher	Robert Fisher & Arthur Marx and Tom Whedon	April 2, 1978	166684
Mel thinks about letting a waitress go to save money.
48	24	"Earthquake"	Noam Pitlik	Story by : Chris Hayward; Teleplay by : Chris Hayward and Gary Markowitz	April 9, 1978	166662
A Native American predicts an earthquake will strike.
