= Don't Wait Up (TV series) =

Television series

- Created by: George Layton
- Directed by: Harold Snoad
- Starring: Tony Britton; Nigel Havers; Dinah Sheridan; Susan Skipper; Jane How
- Country of origin: United Kingdom
- Original language: English
- No. of series: 6
- No. of episodes: 39

Production
- Producer: Harold Snoad
- Running time: 30 minutes

Original release
- Network: BBC1
- Release: 25 October 1983 – 25 March 1990

Don't Wait Up is a British sitcom that was broadcast for six series from 25 October 1983 to 25 March 1990 on BBC1. It starred Nigel Havers, Tony Britton and Dinah Sheridan, and was written by George Layton. It was directed and produced by Harold Snoad. The series was adapted in part from an earlier, unbroadcast Comedy Playhouse by Layton.

Don't Wait Up was repeated on Comedy Central Extra and in 2003, Playback released the first two series on DVD.

== Plot ==
Don't Wait Up starts as Tom Latimer splits from his wife Helen. At the same time, his father Toby, also a doctor, announces his intention to divorce his wife of 32 years, Angela. Father and son then move in together and frequently argue about politics and medical practices, Toby being more of a 'Harley Street' type and well to the right of the more liberally-inclined Tom. The latter tries to get his parents back together, while beginning a romance with Toby's secretary Madeleine Forbes, whom he later marries.

== Cast ==
- Tony Britton as Dr Toby Latimer
- Nigel Havers as Dr Tom Latimer
- Dinah Sheridan as Angela Latimer
- Jane How as Helen Kramer (previously Latimer)
- Susan Skipper as Madeleine Latimer (née Forbes)
- Richard Heffer as Dr Charles Cartwright (series 1 and 2)
- Simon Williams as Dr Charles Cartwright (from series 3)
- Tricia George as Susan Cartwright
- Jane Booker as Felicity Spicer-Gibbs
- Timothy Bateson as Mr Burton (series 1 and 2)
- Joan Ryan as Lady Greshott

== Episodes ==
Series	Episodes	Originally released	
Series	Episodes	First released	Last released
1	7	25 October 1983	6 December 1983
2	6	18 October 1984	22 November 1984
3	7	2 December 1985	27 January 1986
4	6	2 March 1987	6 April 1987
5	7	6 June 1988	18 July 1988
6	6	18 February 1990	25 March 1990

== Home releases ==
The first two series were released in a boxset in 2003 by Playback. No further series have been released.

Acorn Media re-released the first two series in June 2012.
