= Alice season 3 =

Alice
- Season 3
- No. of episodes: 24

Release
- Original network: CBS
- Original release: September 24, 1978 – April 1, 1979

Season chronology
- ← Previous; Season 2 Next → Season 4

This is a list of episodes for the third season of Alice.

== Broadcast history ==
The season originally aired Sundays at 9:30-10:00 pm (EST) from September 24 to October 8, 1978, at 8:30-9:00 pm (EST) from October 15, 1978 to February 25, 1979 and at 9:00-9:30 pm (EST) from March 11 to April 1, 1979.

== Episodes ==
No. overall	No. in season	Title	Directed by	Written by	Original release date	Prod. code
49	1	"Take Him, He's Yours"	William Asher	Robert Fisher & Arthur Marx	September 24, 1978	166803
Mel bets Alice he can raise Tommy better than she can.
50	2	"Car Wars"	William Asher	Robert Fisher & Arthur Marx	October 1, 1978	166801
The girls buy a car from Mel that doesn't start.
51	3	"Citizen Mel"	William Asher	Charles Isaacs	October 8, 1978	166807
Mel identifies a criminal who assaulted his last witness.
52	4	"Vera's Popcorn Romance"	William Asher	Tom Whedon	October 15, 1978	166808
Vera is unwilling to let everyone meet the guy she met at the movies.
53	5	"Block Those Kicks"	William Asher	Robert Fisher & Arthur Marx	October 22, 1978	166804
Everyone at the diner tries to kick their bad habits.
54	6	"What Happened to the Class of '78?"	William Asher	Tom Whedon	October 29, 1978	166806
Flo attends night school, but her night life gets in the way of her studies.
55	7	"Better Never Than Late"	William Asher	Tom Whedon	November 5, 1978	166802
The diner is robbed while Mel sleeps in the storeroom.
56	8	"Mel's in a Family Way"	William Asher	Story by : Jerry Winnick; Teleplay by : Jerry Winnick and Tom Whedon	November 11, 1978	166809
Alice invites Mel to dinner with her family, but he misinterprets his intentions.
57	9	"Who Ordered the Hot Turkey?"	William Asher	Tom Whedon	November 19, 1978	166810
Mel discovers that the turkeys he bought for Thanksgiving dinner at an orphanage are stolen. Guest starring James Cromwell, Joyce Bulifant and Corey Feldman & Nancy McKeon (Phillip McKeon's real life sister) as two of the orphans.
58	10	"The Happy Hoofers"	William Asher	Robert Fisher & Arthur Marx	November 26, 1978	166812
Alice gets a second job delivering singing telegrams, but it's making her late for the diner.
59	11	"A Slight Case of ESP"	William Asher	Alan Rosen & Fred Rubin	December 3, 1978	166811
Although he's skeptic about it, Mel looks for a way to exploit Vera's ability to predict the future.
60	12	"The Principal of the Thing"	William Asher	Robert Fisher & Arthur Marx	December 10, 1978	166805
Tommy does not approve of his mother dating his principal (Gary Collins).
61	13	"What're You Doing New Year's Eve?"	Marc Daniels	Dawn Aldredge & Marion C. Freeman	December 31, 1978	166819
Flo doesn't have a date for New Year's Eve.
62	14	"Sweet Charity"	William Asher	Robert Fisher & Arthur Marx	January 14, 1979	166813
Alice's date (Ron Rifkin) has two extra tickets to a celebrity ball and everyone wants them. Note: This episode was supposed to air one week earlier, but due to CBS's coverage of the 1978 NFC Championship running long, it was pushed back one week later, despite CBS running promotions for the episode during the game.
63	15	"The Fourth Time Around"	William Asher	Robert Fisher & Arthur Marx	January 21, 1979	166815
Flo and Mel's brother (Carmine Caridi) think about getting married, even though it would be the fourth marriage for both of them.
64	16	"Tommy's First Love"	William Asher	Robert Fisher & Arthur Marx	January 28, 1979	166816
Alice is upset with Tommy for using the phone too much to speak with his first crush (Olivia Barash). Guest starring Bruce Kirby as Mr. Lloyd, Melissa's father.
65	17	"Mel Grows Up"	William Asher	Robert Fisher & Arthur Marx	February 4, 1979	166818
Mel's pushy mother (Martha Raye) spends the winter near him.
66	18	"Vera's Broken Heart"	Lee Lochhead	Robert Fisher & Arthur Marx and Tom Whedon	February 18, 1979	166814
Vera is left with a broken heart when her boyfriend says he's marrying someone else.
67	19	"Alice's Decision"	Lee Lochhead	Robert Fisher & Arthur Marx and Tom Whedon	February 25, 1979	166817
Alice must decide what to do with Tommy when she's offered a chance at singing on the road.
68	20	"The Last Stow It"	William Asher	Robert Fisher & Arthur Marx	March 11, 1979	166821
69	21	"The Last Stow It"	William Asher	Robert Fisher & Arthur Marx	March 11, 1979	166822
Mel opens an eatery in Alice's apartment after selling the diner to a humorless restaurateur (Hans Conried).
70	22	"If the Shoe Fits"	Marc Daniels	Tom Whedon and Charles Isaacs	March 18, 1979	166820
Alice and Vera are up for the same part in a play being cast by a handsome director.
71	23	"My Fair Vera"	William Asher	Robert Fisher & Arthur Marx	March 25, 1979	166823
Vera is asked to audition for a supermarket commercial. The Lennon Sisters make a cameo.
72	24	"Flo Finds Her Father"	William Asher	Dawn Aldredge & Marion C. Freeman	April 1, 1979	166824
Flo's father (Forrest Tucker) comes back into her life long after abandoning her when she was a child.
