= List of Don't Wait Up episodes =

This is a list of episodes for BBC British sitcom Don't Wait Up, which aired between 1983 and 1990.

== Series overview ==
Series	Episodes	Originally released	
Series	Episodes	First released	Last released
1	7	25 October 1983	6 December 1983
2	6	18 October 1984	22 November 1984
3	7	2 December 1985	27 January 1986
4	6	2 March 1987	6 April 1987
5	7	6 June 1988	18 July 1988
6	6	18 February 1990	25 March 1990

== Episodes ==
=== Series 1 (1983) ===
No. overall	No. in series	Title	Original release date
1	1	"Father Moves In"	25 October 1983
2	2	"Two in a Bed"	1 November 1983
3	3	"Efforts at Reconciliation"	8 November 1983
4	4	"Car Trouble"	15 November 1983
5	5	"Causing Offence"	22 November 1983
6	6	"Out All Night"	29 November 1983
7	7	"A Weekend Away"	6 December 1983

=== Series 2 (1984) ===
No. overall	No. in series	Title	Original release date
8	1	"After the Conference"	18 October 1984
9	2	"Notice to Quit"	25 October 1984
10	3	"The Locum Scheme"	1 November 1984
11	4	"A Difficult Choice"	8 November 1984
12	5	"Falling Out"	15 November 1984
13	6	"Getting Back Together"	22 November 1984

=== Series 3 (1985–86) ===
No. overall	No. in series	Title	Original release date
14	1	"The Cruise"	2 December 1985
15	2	"Embarrassment"	9 December 1985
16	3	"The Frenchman"	16 December 1985
17	4	"Getting On"	6 January 1986
18	5	"Freedom"	13 January 1986
19	6	"Arrested"	20 January 1986
20	7	"Together Again?"	27 January 1986

=== Series 4 (1987) ===
No. overall	No. in series	Title	Original release date
21	1	"Fire"	2 March 1987
22	2	"Family Matters"	9 March 1987
23	3	"Wherever I Lay My Hat"	16 March 1987
24	4	"Staying With Toby"	23 March 1987
25	5	"The Flat"	30 March 1987
26	6	"The Reunion"	6 April 1987

=== Series 5 (1988) ===
No. overall	No. in series	Title	Original release date
27	1	"The Engagement"	6 June 1988
28	2	"Wedding Plans"	13 June 1988
29	3	"Morning Sickness"	20 June 1988
30	4	"Mr. And Mrs."	27 June 1988
31	5	"The Surprise"	4 July 1988
32	6	"Semi-Retirement"	11 July 1988
33	7	"Golf"	18 July 1988

=== Series 6 (1990) ===
No. overall	No. in series	Title	Original release date
34	1	"House Hunting"	18 February 1990
35	2	"The Insurance Medical"	25 February 1990
36	3	"Pastures New"	4 March 1990
37	4	"The Article"	11 March 1990
38	5	"Living Arrangements"	18 March 1990
39	6	"Birth"	25 March 1990
