= Paul Smith (television writer) =

British television writer (born 1961)

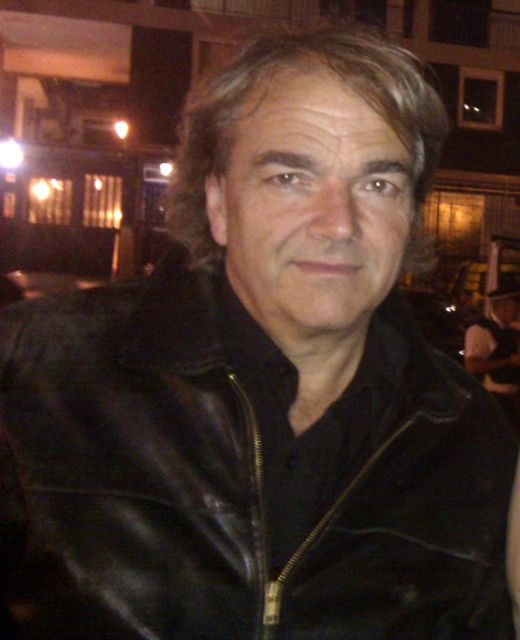
- Born: 18 November 1961 (age 64) London, England
- Occupation: Screenwriter and television producer
- Period: 1982–present
- Genre: Comedy, drama, adventure
- Spouse: Eve Murray
- Children: 2

Paul Smith (born 18 November 1961) is a British television writer who was born and lives in London.

Smith's four-part BBC1 drama One Night (executive producer Hilary Salmon) won the Reflet D'Or for Best Drama Series at the 2012 Festival Tous Ecrans as well as making the official selection for FIPA Biarritz. Lead writer on Jam Media/CBBC's pioneering live action/animation series ROY (RTS Award for Best Children's Drama 2010, two 2011 BAFTA nominations, including Writers' Award), Smith also wrote ten-part CBBC teen drama series Desperados (Prix Jeunesse 2008), about a junior wheelchair basketball team. He has also written two BBC1 Afternoon Plays – Tea with Betty starring Rosemary Leach as Queen Elizabeth II and Death Becomes Him. His other recent work includes ITV1 comedy drama The Complete Guide to Parenting starring Peter Davison (British Comedy Guide Editors' Award), the Sunday serial dramatisation of Bootleg (BAFTA Children's Drama Award) and BBC1 children's thriller series Oscar Charlie. Further credits include Murder Most Horrid (British Comedy Award and starring Dawn French), Grange Hill, Brittas Empire, Spitting Image, Alas Smith and Jones; and, with Terry Kyan, Colin's Sandwich (two series starring Mel Smith) and About Face, starring Maureen Lipman

Smith is married to Eve Murray who works for the British Museum – they have two children, Daniel and Emma.

== Writing credits ==
Production	Notes	Broadcaster
Not the Nine O'Clock News	3 episodes (1982)	BBC2
Alas Smith and Jones	"Episode #1.6" (1984)	BBC2
Spitting Image	5 episodes (1984–1985)	ITV
Hello Mum	"Episode #1.1" (1987)	BBC2
Colin's Sandwich	12 episodes (co-written with Terry Kyan, 1988–1990)	BBC2
Murder Most Horrid	"The Girl from Ipanema" (1991); "He Died a Death" (1991); "Lady Luck" (1994); "Girl Friday" (1996); "Going Solo" (1999)	BBC2
About Face	"Tourist Attraction" (1991); "Monkey Business" (1991)	ITV
Bonjour la Classe	6 episodes (co-written with Terry Kyan, 1993)	BBC1
The Brittas Empire	"Snap Happy" (1996); "http://etc" (1997); "Exposed" (1997)	BBC1
2point4 Children	"Malcolm X" (1998); "The Italian Job" (1998)	BBC1
Big Kids	"Simon Pursues Melanie" (2000); "Chicken Pox" (2000)	CBBC
Grange Hill	13 episodes (2000–2001)	CBBC
Cavegirl	"Trouble at the Top (2002); "Swap Til You Drop (2002); "Peace in My Time (2002)	CBBC
Oscar Charlie	13 episodes (2001–2002)	CBBC
Bootleg	Television miniseries (2002)	BBC One
The Complete Guide to Parenting	5 episodes (2006)	ITV
The Afternoon Play	"Tea with Betty" (2006); "Death Becomes Him" (2007)	BBC One
Desperados	10 episodes (2007)	CBBC
Roy	"New Boy" (2009); "Sick" (2009); "Testing, Testing" (2009); "School Inspection" (2009); "Foot Fat Fit" (2012); "Death in the Family" (2012); "Magical Roy" (2012)	CBBC; TRTÉ
One Night	Television miniseries (2012)	BBC One

== Awards and nominations ==
Year	Award	Work	Category	Result	Reference
1992	British Comedy Awards	Murder Most Horrid	Best TV Comedy Drama	Won	
2003	British Academy Children's Awards	Bootleg	Best Drama	Won	
2006	British Comedy Guide	The Complete Guide to Parenting	Best British Sitcom Editors' Award	Won	
2008	Prix Jeunesse International	Desperados	Prize of the Children's Jury 7–11 Fiction	Won	
2008	Royal Television Society Awards	Desperados	Best Children's Drama	Nominated	
2010	British Academy Children's Awards	Roy	Best Children's Writer	Nominated	
2012	Cinéma Tous Ecrans	One Night	Le Reflet d'Or Best International Television Series	Won	
