= Bonjour la Classe =

British television series

- Genre: Comedy
- Created by: Terry Kyan; Paul Smith
- Directed by: John Henderson
- Creative director: Chris Lowe
- Starring: Nigel Planer; Polly Adams; Timothy Bateson; Victoria Carling
- Theme music composer: Philip Pope
- Composer: Philip Pope
- Country of origin: United Kingdom
- Original language: English
- No. of series: 1
- No. of episodes: 6

Production
- Executive producer: Peter Fincham
- Producer: Jamie Rix
- Production locations: Aldenham School, Hertfordshire
- Cinematography: John Henshall
- Editor: Colin Green
- Camera setup: John Johnson
- Running time: 30 minutes
- Production company: TalkBack

Original release
- Network: BBC1
- Release: 15 February – 22 March 1993

Bonjour la Classe is a British television comedy series which was broadcast on BBC1 in the beginning of 1993. Created and written by Paul Smith and Terry Kyan, the series centred on Laurence Didcott, a new teacher of French at the fictional prestigious Mansion School.

Didcott discovers a prevailing attitude at Mansion, among staff, benefactors and even students and parents that places what is best for the school (e.g. fundraising, school image) ahead of the education of the pupils and their wellbeing. The scenes at the school were shot in the winter of 1992.

== Cast ==
- Nigel Planer – Laurence Didcott
- Polly Adams – Jean Halifax
- Timothy Bateson – Leonard Wigley
- Victoria Carling – Harriet Humphrey
- Robert Gillespie – Gilbert Herring
- David Troughton – Eric Sweety
- Nicholas Woodeson – Leslie Piper
- Peter Woodthorpe – Donald Halifax
- Rebecca Callard – Lucy Cornwell
- Bryan Dick – Adam Huntley
- David Larkin – Clive Crotty
- Daniel Newman – Hugo Botney
- Simeon Pearl – Anthony Zalacosta
- Camilla Power – Pamela Slotover
- Elizabeth Alexander
