= Colin's Sandwich =

- Genre: Comedy
- Created by: Terry Kyan; Paul Smith
- Directed by: John Kilby
- Starring: Mel Smith; Louisa Rix; Tony Haase; Andrew Robertson; Mike Grady; Lee Cornes; Nicholas Ball; Lindsay Duncan; Annette Crosbie
- Country of origin: United Kingdom
- Original language: English
- No. of series: 2
- No. of episodes: 12

Production
- Producer: Jamie Rix
- Running time: 30 minutes

Original release
- Network: BBC2
- Release: 18 October 1988 – 16 February 1990

Colin's Sandwich is a British sitcom that was broadcast on BBC2 in 1988 and 1990. It starred Mel Smith as Colin Watkins, a British Rail administrator who aspired to be a horror writer. The show was written by Paul Smith and Terry Kyan and ran for two series of six episodes (18 October – 22 November 1988 and 12 January – 16 February 1990). In the second series, Colin manages to achieve some small successes as a writer.

== Synopsis ==
The central character, Colin Watkins, is an educated, intelligent, neurotic man in his mid-thirties. By day he works in a dead-end job for British Rail in their complaints department, where he listens to, and attempts to appease, a combination of complainants and abusive customers. (At the time the series was broadcast, British Rail had a poor reputation for its performance.) While the job involves mundane tasks such as photocopying and dealing with customers, Colin dreams of being a horror author.

Colin lives alone in a top-floor flat though his girlfriend Jenny and his best friend Des often share time with him there. Jenny and Colin are revealed to have met at university and share a sexual relationship, though apparently do not maintain one. He is a neurotic who often turns to alcohol (whisky or white wine) for solace. Jenny is more down-to-earth and is a stable figure in his life. He tries to do the right thing in the numerous situations he ends up in (being bored by friends' endless dreary dinner parties, finding a dead cat and returning it to its owner, going on holiday while continually fretting about leaving appliances on in his flat). He is often conflicted and has a borderline depressive attitude to life – brought about in one episode by his colleague leaving British Rail for pastures new who encourages Colin to do the same.

The overarching plot of Series 1 has Colin submitting one of his few finished works to John Langley, a tough publisher who includes it in his anthology of horror short stories.

== Home media ==
After its original transmission, the second series was repeated on BBC2 during the Summer of 1992, and it was frequently shown on UK Gold during its early years, although the show has rarely been repeated since then with a rare showing in Summer 2026. The series was released on DVD by Simply Media on 9 June 2014, nearly a year after Mel Smith's passing. The boxset consisted of both Series 1 and 2.

== Episodes ==
Series	Episodes	Originally released	
Series	Episodes	First released	Last released
1	6	18 October 1988	22 November 1988
2	6	12 January 1990	16 February 1990

=== Series 1 (1988) ===
No. overall	No. in series	Title	Directed by	Written by	Original release date
1	1	"Flaunt It"	Jamie Rix	Terry Kyan and Paul Smith	18 October 1988
Colin's told that he's the only man for a huge photocopying job, a fashion assignment in Bengal means an unwanted emergency dinner party, and an extremely boring guest stands in the way of an exciting opportunity.
2	2	"Time Out"	Jamie Rix	Terry Kyan and Paul Smith	25 October 1988
A decision has to be made about who's entitled to a period of leave, Jen suggests going on holiday to get away from the British summer, and different requirements lead to a suggestion about going separate ways.
3	3	"Enough"	Jamie Rix	Terry Kyan and Paul Smith	1 November 1988
Colin's told to cut back on excesses for a fortnight after a health scare, the agony of it all isn't helped by a leaving party and Chinese takeaway, and an appointment with old acquaintances only prolongs the agony.
4	4	"Pussyfoot"	Jamie Rix	Terry Kyan and Paul Smith	8 November 1988
Colin's offered a chance to be published in the Langley Book of Horror, the pressure of a deadline leads to a bad case of creative impotence, and an effort to get away from constant distractions leads to the biggest yet.
5	5	"Back from Bengal"	Jamie Rix	Terry Kyan and Paul Smith	15 November 1988
Colin worries about his story making it to John Langley's office, the wait for the ring of the telephone is interrupted by returning friends, and an attempted apology leads to the most boring ear-bending in history.
6	6	"Night on the Town"	Jamie Rix	Terry Kyan and Paul Smith	22 November 1988
Missing out on a Eurotunnel event leaves Colin considering his future, good news from John Langley comes with an invite to dinner, and a moment of cowardice on the underground proves to be a distraction.

=== Series 2 (1990) ===
No. overall	No. in series	Title	Directed by	Written by	Original release date
7	1	"A Bit Whiffy"	Jamie Rix	Terry Kyan and Paul Smith	12 January 1990
Colin enjoys the praise that comes with the launch of the Langley Book of Horror, a film producer asks for a treatment by the end of the week, and Jen wants to relax after suddenly finding herself out of work.
8	2	"A Piece of Cake"	Jamie Rix	Terry Kyan and Paul Smith	19 January 1990
Colin tries to hold in his inner child when he attends a boring wedding, Trevor's announcement that he's getting married comes with a surprise request, and attempts to inject some originality don't quite hit the mark.
9	3	"Zanzibar"	Jamie Rix	Terry Kyan and Paul Smith	26 January 1990
The fallout from a hijacked train provides inspiration for a story for a TV series, Jen accepts the offer of a lift for a second interview in Berkshire, and Colin begs not to be left alone with two consistently tedious guests.
10	4	"Night Thoughts"	Jamie Rix	Terry Kyan and Paul Smith	2 February 1990
The demands of writing a screenplay begin to take their toll on Colin, the breaking point comes while standing in for Travers on a phone-in radio show, and Jen suggests that it might be time to hand in his notice.
11	5	"Frank"	Jamie Rix	Terry Kyan and Paul Smith	9 February 1990
Alan Hunter proves to be a perfectionist when it comes to endings, Jen starts to question whether there's a future in her relationship, and Colin rushes to the hospital when Des calls with bad news about his father.
12	6	"Out to Lunch"	Jamie Rix	Terry Kyan and Paul Smith	16 February 1990
Colin tries to shut things out by keeping himself as busy as possible, Jen suggests going on a relaxing holiday to get away from it all, and a trip to the 'best restaurant in the world' proves to be a stressful experience.
