= The birds and the bees =

Euphemism used in sex education

"The birds and the bees" is a colloquial expression referring to a rite of passage in the lives of most children when parents begin sex education by starting to explain human sexuality, sexual intercourse and pregnancy to them.

== Meaning ==
According to tradition, "the birds and the bees" are metaphorical narratives sometimes told to children in an attempt to explain the mechanics and results of sexual reproduction through reference to easily observed occurrences in nature: bees carry and deposit pollen into flowers, a visible and easy-to-explain parallel to sperm and fertilization; while female birds lay eggs, a similarly visible and easy-to-explain parallel to internal ovulation and giving birth.

== Origin and history ==
While the earliest documented use of the expression remains somewhat nebulous, it is generally regarded as having been coined by Samuel Taylor Coleridge. Published in 1825, Coleridge's first verse in the poem "Work Without Hope" refers to both bees and birds in reference to the coming fecundity of spring:

All Nature seems at work. Slugs leave their lair—
The bees are stirring—birds are on the wing—
And Winter, slumbering in the open air,
Wears on his smiling face a dream of Spring!

One scholar notes an earlier reference to "birds and bees" on columns in St. Peter's Basilica from a 1644 entry in the diary of English writer John Evelyn.

By the late 19th century, the phrase was common enough to appear in such works as essays by John Burroughs and publications explaining reproduction to children.

== See also ==
- Sex education
- Sexual reproduction
