= 1989 in literature =

This article contains information about the literary events and publications of 1989.

== Events ==
- February 14 – Ayatollah Ruhollah Khomeini, Supreme Leader of Iran (died 3 June 1989), issues a fatwa calling for the death of Indian-born British author Salman Rushdie and his publishers for issuing the novel The Satanic Verses (1988). On February 24 Iran places a US $3 million bounty on Rushdie's head. On August 3, 1989, a bomb kills Mustafa Mazeh in London as he attempts to plant it in a hotel, in order to carry out the fatwa.
- March 1 – The Berne Convention Implementation Act of 1988 comes into effect in the United States, making the country a party to the Berne Convention for the Protection of Literary and Artistic Works of 1886.
- April 23 – Leading figures of the theatre mark William Shakespeare's birthday with a street party to oppose the destruction of the recently discovered archaeological remains of the English Renaissance Rose Theatre and Globe theatres in London.
- October – The National Library of Norway is established, with a new building at Mo i Rana.
- December 29 – Playwright Václav Havel becomes President of Czechoslovakia.

== New books ==
=== Fiction ===
- Hanan al-Shaykh – Women of Sand and Myrrh (Misk al–ghazal)
- Martin Amis – London Fields
- Piers Anthony – Total Recall
- Iain Banks – Canal Dreams
- John Banville – The Book of Evidence
- Clive Barker – The Great and Secret Show
- Julian Barnes – A History of the World in 10½ Chapters
- Thomas Berger – Changing the Past
- Larry Bond – Red Phoenix
- Larry Brown – Dirty Work
- Anthony Burgess – Any Old Iron
- Nick Cave – And the Ass Saw the Angel
- Tom Clancy – Clear and Present Danger
- Mary Higgins Clark – While My Pretty One Sleeps
- Hugh Cook – The Wicked and the Witless
- Bernard Cornwell
  - Sharpe's Revenge
  - Sea Lord (aka Killer's Wake)
- Bryce Courtenay – The Power of One
- Robert Crais – Stalking the Angel
- Lindsey Davis – The Silver Pigs
- L. Sprague de Camp
  - The Honorable Barbarian
  - (with Fletcher Pratt) – The Complete Compleat Enchanter
- E. L. Doctorow – Billy Bathgate
- Katherine Dunn – Geek Love
- Umberto Eco – Foucault's Pendulum
- George Alec Effinger – A Fire in the Sun
- Mircea Eliade (died 1986) – Diary of a Short-Sighted Adolescent (Romanul adolescentului miop) (written 1921–1925)
- Ben Elton – Stark
- Steve Erickson – Tours of the Black Clock
- Laura Esquivel – Like Water for Chocolate (Como agua para chocolate)
- Robert Fisher - The Knight in Rusty Armor
- Ken Follett – The Pillars of the Earth
- Frederick Forsyth – The Negotiator
- Jon Fosse – Naustet (Boathouse)
- Gabriel García Márquez – The General in His Labyrinth (El general en su laberinto)
- John Gardner
  - Licence to Kill
  - Win, Lose or Die
- Charles Gill – The Boozer Challenge
- John Grisham – A Time to Kill
- A. M. Homes – Jack
- Robert E. Howard, L. Sprague de Camp and Lin Carter – The Conan Chronicles
- John Irving – A Prayer for Owen Meany
- Kazuo Ishiguro – The Remains of the Day
- Fleur Jaeggy – it:I beati anni del castigo (Sweet Days of Discipline)
- Randall Kenan – A Visitation of Spirits
- Elias Khoury – رحلة غاندي الصغير (Rihlat Ghandi al-saghir, The Journey of Little Gandhi)
- Stephen King – The Dark Half
- László Krasznahorkai – The Melancholy of Resistance (Az ellenállás melankóliája)
- Joe R. Lansdale
  - Cold in July
  - By Bizarre Hands
- John le Carré – The Russia House
- H. P. Lovecraft – The Horror in the Museum and Other Revisions (corrected edition)
- Hilary Mantel – Fludd
- Javier Marías – Todas las almas (All Souls)
- James A. Michener – Six Days in Havana
- Hanna Mina – The End of a Brave Man (Nihayat Rajul Shujaa)
- Bharati Mukherjee – Jasmine
- Larry Niven – The Legacy of Heorot
- Joyce Carol Oates – American Appetites
- Robert B. Parker – Playmates
- Ellis Peters
  - The Heretic's Apprentice
  - The Potter's Field
- Giuseppe Pontiggia – La grande sera
- Terry Pratchett
  - Guards! Guards!
  - Pyramids
- Paul Quarrington – Whale Music
- Mordecai Richler – Solomon Gursky Was Here
- Giampaolo Rugarli – Il nido di ghiaccio
- José Saramago – The History of the Siege of Lisbon
- Sidney Sheldon – The Sands of Time
- Dan Simmons – Hyperion
- John Skipp and Craig Spector – Book of the Dead
- Danielle Steel
  - Daddy
  - Star
- Bruce Sterling – Crystal Express
- Alexander Stuart – The War Zone
- Amy Tan – The Joy Luck Club
- Shashi Tharoor – The Great Indian Novel
- Rose Tremain – Restoration
- Jane Vandenburgh – Failure to Zig-Zag
- Andrew Vachss – Hard Candy
- Alice Walker – The Temple of My Familiar
- Robert McLiam Wilson – Ripley Bogle
- Roger Zelazny
  - Frost & Fire (short stories and essays)
  - Knight of Shadows
- Barbara Kingsolver - The Bean Trees

=== Children and young people ===
- Verna Aardema – Rabbit Makes a Monkey of Lion
- Joyce Barkhouse – Pit Pony
- Bruce Coville – My Teacher Is an Alien
- Anne Fine
  - Bill's New Frock
  - Goggle-Eyes
- Mark Helprin (with Chris Van Allsburg) – Swan Lake
- Yoshi Kogo – Big Al
- Norman Maclean (with Barry Moser) – A River Runs Through It
- Bill Martin Jr. (with Lois Ehlert) – Chicka Chicka Boom Boom
- David McKee – Elmer
- Jim Murphy – The Call Of The Wolves
- Bill Peet – Bill Peet: An Autobiography
- Robert D. San Souci – The Talking Eggs: A Folktale from the American South
- Jon Scieszka (with Lane Smith) – The True Story of the 3 Little Pigs!
- R. L. Stine – The New Girl (first in the Fear Street series of 55 books)
- Christopher Tolkien (with J. R. R. Tolkien and Alan Lee) – The Treason of Isengard
- Hélène Desputeaux – Caillou
- Michael Rosen – We're Going on a Bear Hunt

=== Drama ===
- Herman Brusselmans and Tom Lanoye – De Canadese muur (The Canadian Wall)
- Jim Cartwright – Two
- Nick Darke – Kissing the Pope (original title: Campesinos)
- Michael Wall – Amongst Barbarians
- Keith Waterhouse – Jeffrey Bernard is Unwell

=== Poetry ===
- Simon Armitage – Zoom!
- Paul Fleischman – Joyful Noise: Poems for Two Voices
- David Lehman – The Best American Poetry 1989

=== Non-fiction ===
- Gisela Bleibtreu-Ehrenberg – Angst und Vorurteil
- Bill Bryson – The Lost Continent: Travels in Small-Town America
- Rodney Cotterill – No Ghost in the Machine: Modern Science and the Brain, the Mind, and the Soul
- Stephen R. Covey – The Seven Habits of Highly Effective People
- Bruno Dagens – Angkor: Heart of an Asian Empire
- William Dalrymple – In Xanadu: A Quest
- Cynthia Enloe – Bananas, Beaches and Bases
- Stanley Hauerwas and William Willimon – Resident Aliens: Life in the Christian Colony
- Rüdiger Imhof – John Banville: A Critical Introduction, the first full-length appraisal of the work of major turn of the century writer John Banville.
- Tim Jeal – Baden-Powell
- Pauline Kael – Hooked
- Bob Kane and Tom Andrae – Batman and Me
- John Keegan – The Face of Battle
- Dale Maharidge and Michael Williamson – And Their Children After Them
- Peter Mayle – A Year in Provence
- Claudia Moatti – The Search for Ancient Rome
- Ann Moir and David Jessel – Brain Sex
- New Revised Standard Version of the Bible
- Michael Palin – Around the World in 80 Days
- Harold Perkin – The Rise of Professional Society. England Since 1880
- Gilda Radner – It's Always Something
- Peter Sloterdijk – Infinite Mobilization (Eurotaoismus)
- Dan Topolski and Patrick Robinson – True Blue: The Oxford Boat Race Mutiny
- V. Vale and Andrea Juno – Modern Primitives
- Andy Warhol and Pat Hackett – The Andy Warhol Diaries
- Jeremy Wilson – Lawrence of Arabia: The Authorized Biography of T. E. Lawrence
- Bob Wood – Big Ten Country

== Births ==
- August 26 - Sara Raasch, American young-adult fiction writer

== Deaths ==
- January 4 – Srikrishna Alanahalli, Indian novelist and poet (born 1947)
- January 8 – Bruce Chatwin, English travel writer and novelist (born 1940)
- February 3 – John Cassavetes, American actor, director and writer (born 1929)
- February 12 – Thomas Bernhard, Austrian author (born 1931)
- February 21 – Denys Corley Smith, English author and journalist (born 1922)
- March 14 – Edward Abbey, American essayist (born 1927)
- March 27 – Malcolm Cowley, American novelist and poet (born 1898)
- April 14 – Laurence Meynell (Valerie Baxter, A. Stephen Tring), English novelist and children's writer (born 1899)
- April 19 – Daphne du Maurier, English novelist (born 1907)
- May 19 – C. L. R. James, Trinidad-born American journalist (born 1901)
- May 20 – Erzsébet Galgóczi, Hungarian novelist, playwright and screenwriter (born 1930)
- July 31 – Zhou Yang, Chinese literary theorist (born 1908)
- August 23 – R. D. Laing, Scottish psychologist and author (born 1927)
- August 26 – Irving Stone, American novelist (born 1903)
- September 4
  - Georges Simenon, Belgian novelist and crime writer (born 1903)
  - Sir Ronald Syme, New Zealand classicist (born 1903)
- September 13 – Acharya Aatreya, Telugu screenwriter (born 1921)
- September 15 – Robert Penn Warren, American poet and novelist (born 1905)
- September 30
  - Horace Alexander, English current-affairs writer and ornithologist (born 1909)
  - Oskar Davičo, Serbian novelist and poet (born 1909)
- October 13 – Cesare Zavattini, Italian screenwriter (born 1902)
- November 22 – José Guadalupe Cruz, Mexican comics writer (born 1917)
- December 5 – George Selden (Terry Andrews), American children's author (gastrointestinal bleeding, born 1929)
- December 19 – Stella Gibbons, English novelist (born 1902)
- December 22 – Samuel Beckett, Irish-born playwright, novelist and poet (born 1906)
- December 26 – Paul Jennings, English humorist (born 1918)

== Awards ==
- Nobel Prize for Literature: Camilo José Cela
- Europe Theatre Prize: Peter Brook
- Camões Prize (first award): Miguel Torga

=== Australia ===
- The Australian/Vogel Literary Award: Mandy Sayer, Mood Indigo
- C. J. Dennis Prize for Poetry: Gwen Harwood, Bone Scan
- Kenneth Slessor Prize for Poetry: John Tranter, Under Berlin
- Mary Gilmore Prize: Alex Skovron, The Re-arrangement
- Miles Franklin Award: Peter Carey, Oscar and Lucinda

=== Canada ===
- See 1989 Governor General's Awards for a complete list of winners and finalists for those awards.

=== France ===
- Prix Goncourt: Jean Vautrin, Un grand Pas vers le Bon Dieu
- Prix Décembre: Guy Dupré, Les Manœuvres d'automne
- Prix Médicis French: Serge Doubrovsky, Le Livre brisé
- Prix Médicis International: Alvaro Mutis, La Neige de l'amiral

=== United Kingdom ===
- Booker Prize: Kazuo Ishiguro – The Remains of the Day
- Carnegie Medal for children's literature: Anne Fine, Goggle-Eyes
- Cholmondeley Award: Peter Didsbury, Douglas Dunn, E. J. Scovell
- Eric Gregory Award: Gerard Woodward, David Morley, Katrina Porteous, Paul Henry
- James Tait Black Memorial Prize for fiction: James Kelman, A Disaffection
- James Tait Black Memorial Prize for biography: Ian Gibson, Federico Garcia Lorca: A Life
- Newdigate prize: Jane Griffiths
- Queen's Gold Medal for Poetry: Allen Curnow
- Whitbread Best Book Award: Richard Holmes, Coleridge: Early Visions
- The Sunday Express Book of the Year: Rose Tremain, Restoration

=== United States ===
- Agnes Lynch Starrett Poetry Prize: Nancy Vieira Couto, The Face in the Water
- Aiken Taylor Award for Modern American Poetry: Anthony Hecht
- American Academy of Arts and Letters Gold Medal for Fiction, Isaac Bashevis Singer
- Bernard F. Connors Prize for Poetry: Jorie Graham, "Spring"
- Compton Crook Award: Elizabeth Moon, Sheepfarmer's Daughter
- Frost Medal: Gwendolyn Brooks
- National Book Critics Circle Award: to The Broken Cord by Michael Dorris
- National Book Award for Fiction: to Spartina by John Casey
- Nebula Award: Elizabeth Ann Scarborough, The Healer's War
- Newbery Medal for children's literature: Paul Fleischman, Joyful Noise
- PEN/Faulkner Award for Fiction: to Dusk and Other Stories by James Salter
- Pulitzer Prize for Drama: Wendy Wasserstein, The Heidi Chronicles
- Pulitzer Prize for Fiction: Anne Tyler – Breathing Lessons
- Pulitzer Prize for Poetry: Richard Wilbur: New and Collected Poems
- Whiting Awards:

Fiction: Ellen Akins, Marianne Wiggins
Nonfiction: Ian Frazier, Natalie Kusz, Lucy Sante, Tobias Wolff (nonfiction/fiction)
Plays: Timberlake Wertenbaker
Poetry: Russell Edson, Mary Karr, C.D. Wright

=== Japan ===
- Falcon Award (Maltese Falcon Society of Japan): Andrew Vachss for Strega
- The Japan Fantasy Novel Award is established, with Ken'ichi Sakemi winning with his novel Kōkyū Shōsetsu.

=== Elsewhere ===
- Friedenspreis des Deutschen Buchhandels: Václav Havel
