= Big Al =

Big Al may refer to:

== People ==
- Al Anderson (born 1947), American guitarist, singer and songwriter
- Adolfo Bruno (1945–2003), American mobster
- Al Capone (1899–1947), American gangster
- Big Al Carson (born 1953), American blues and jazz singer
- Al Downing (musician) (1940–2005), American singer, songwriter and pianist
- Al Horford (born 1986), Dominican professional basketball player
- Al Jefferson (born 1985), American National Basketball Association player
- Al Sears (1910–1990), American jazz saxophonist and bandleader
- Alan Shearer (born 1970), former Newcastle and England International footballer
- Alan Sues (1926–2011), American actor known for roles on Rowan & Martin's Laugh-In (1968–1972)
- Al Szolack (born c. 1950), American former basketball player for the Washington Generals, the team which always loses to the Harlem Globetrotters
- Al Unser (1939–2021), former race car driver
- Alfred Williams (born 1968), American former National Football League player
- Big Al (comedian), Australian comedian
- Al Green (wrestler) (1955–2013), American professional wrestler Alfred Dobalo, ring name "Big Al"
- 911 (wrestler) (born Alfred Poling in 1957), professional wrestler who briefly wrestled as "Big Al" in 1997
- Weird Al (born 1959) singer/songwriter known for his satirical songs

== Arts and entertainment ==
- Big Al, a character in the Disney attraction Country Bear Jamboree.
- Big Al (play), a 2002 off-Broadway play
- Big Al (book), a children's picture book by Andrew Clements
- Big Al, a character in the Ratchet & Clank video game series
- Alfred "Big Al" Delvecchio, a character in the American television sitcom Happy Days.
- Big Al, a character in the 1984 TV series The Beiderbecke Affair and its sequels
- The Vocaloid "Big Al"
- Big Al, a minor character from Mona the Vampire

== Other uses ==
- Big Al Brewing, a craft brewery
- Big Al (dinosaur), a nearly complete Allosaurus specimen discovered in Wyoming in 1991
- Big Al (mascot), the elephant mascot of the University of Alabama

== See also ==
- Big Al's, one of the first topless bars in San Francisco and the United States, later an adult book store which closed in 2009
- Big Gay Al, a character from South Park
