= List of Alice episodes =

Alice is an American sitcom television series that ran from August 31, 1976 to March 19, 1985 on CBS, during which a total of 202 episodes were produced spanning nine seasons. Based on the 1974 film Alice Doesn't Live Here Anymore, the series stars Linda Lavin in the title role, a widow who moves with her young son to start her life over again, and finds a job working at a roadside diner on the outskirts of Phoenix, Arizona. Most of the episodes revolve around events at Mel's Diner.

== Series overview ==
| Season | Episodes | Originally released | | Rank | Rating |
| Season | Episodes | First released | Last released | Rank | Rating |
|---|---|---|---|---|---|
| 1 | 24 | August 31, 1976 | March 26, 1977 | 30 | 20.0 |
| 2 | 24 | October 2, 1977 | April 9, 1978 | 8 | 23.2 (Note: Tied with M*A*S*H) |
| 3 | 24 | September 24, 1978 | April 1, 1979 | 13 | 23.2 |
| 4 | 24 | September 23, 1979 | April 6, 1980 | 4 | 25.3 |
| 5 | 20 | November 2, 1980 | May 3, 1981 | 7 | 22.9 |
| 6 | 24 | October 4, 1981 | May 16, 1982 | 5 | 22.7 |
| 7 | 23 | October 6, 1982 | September 18, 1983 | 41 | —N/a |
| 8 | 23 | October 2, 1983 | May 20, 1984 | 25 | 17.2 (Note: Tied with The CBS Tuesday Night Movie, Webster, Knight Rider and Hardcastle and McCormick) |
| 9 | 16 | October 14, 1984 | March 19, 1985 | 58 | 12.5 |

== Episodes ==
=== Season 1 (1976–77) ===
| No. overall | No. in season | Title | Directed by | Written by | Original release date | Prod. code |
|---|---|---|---|---|---|---|
| 1 | 1 | "Pilot" | Paul Bogart | Robert Getchell | August 31, 1976 | 000001 |
| 2 | 2 | "Alice Gets a Pass" | Jim Drake | Martin Donovan | September 29, 1976 | 166552 |
| 3 | 3 | "A Piece of the Rock" | Bill Persky | Ben Joelson & Art Baer | October 6, 1976 | 166551 |
| 4 | 4 | "Pay the Fifty Dollars" | Bill Persky | Lloyd Garver | October 13, 1976 | 166556 |
| 5 | 5 | "A Call to Arms" | Jim Drake | Lloyd Garver | October 20, 1976 | 166554 |
| 6 | 6 | "The Last Review" | James Sheldon | Harvey Bullock & R.S. Allen | October 27, 1976 | 166557 |
| 7 | 7 | "Sex Education" | Bruce Bilson | Patricia Jones & Donald Reiker | November 6, 1976 | 166558 |
| 8 | 8 | "Big Daddy Dawson's Coming" | Norman Abbott | Arnold Kane & Bruce Johnson | November 13, 1976 | 166559 |
| 9 | 9 | "Good Night, Sweet Vera" | Norman Abbott | Simon Muntner | November 20, 1976 | 166560 |
| 10 | 10 | "The Dilemma" | James Sheldon | Martin Donovan | November 27, 1976 | 166561 |
| 11 | 11 | "Who Killed Bugs Bunny?" | Bruce Bilson | Lloyd J. Schwartz | December 4, 1976 | 166562 |
| 12 | 12 | "Mother-in-Law: Part 1" | William P. D'Angelo | Martin Donovan | December 11, 1976 | 166563 |
| 13 | 13 | "Mother-in-Law: Part 2" | William P. D'Angelo | Arnold Kane & Bruce Johnson and R.S. Allen | December 18, 1976 | 166564 |
| 14 | 14 | "Vera's Mortician" | Bill Hobin | Bruce Kane | December 25, 1976 | 166555 |
| 15 | 15 | "Mel's in Love" | Alan Rafkin | Gary David Goldberg | January 15, 1977 | 166565 |
| 16 | 16 | "The Accident" | Alan Rafkin | Roy Kammerman and Harvey Bullock | January 22, 1977 | 166566 |
| 17 | 17 | "The Failure" | William P. D'Angelo | Art Baer & Ben Joelson | January 29, 1977 | 166567 |
| 18 | 18 | "The Hex" | Alan Rafkin | R.S. Allen & Arnold Kane | February 5, 1977 | 166568 |
| 19 | 19 | "The Pain of No Return" | Alan Rafkin | Rick Mittleman | February 12, 1977 | 166569 |
| 20 | 20 | "The Odd Couple" | William P. D'Angelo | Story by : Roy Kammerman; Teleplay by : Roy Kammerman & Arnold Kane & Harvey Bullock & R.S. Allen | February 26, 1977 | 166570 |
| 21 | 21 | "A Night to Remember" | Alan Rafkin | Arnold Kane and R.S. Allen | March 5, 1977 | 166571 |
| 22 | 22 | "Mel's Cup" | Norman Abbott | Roy Kammerman and Harvey Bullock | March 12, 1977 | 166572 |
| 23 | 23 | "The Bundle" | Norman Abbott | Ben Joelson & Art Baer | March 19, 1977 | 166573 |
| 24 | 24 | "Mel's Happy Burger" | Burt Brinckerhoff | Arnold Kane | March 26, 1977 | 166553 |

=== Season 2 (1977–78) ===
| No. overall | No. in season | Title | Directed by | Written by | Original release date | Prod. code |
|---|---|---|---|---|---|---|
| 25 | 1 | "The Second Time 'Round" | Kim Friedman | Tom Whedon | October 2, 1977 | 166665 |
| 26 | 2 | "The Indian Taker" | Marc Daniels | Tom Whedon | October 9, 1977 | 166667 |
| 27 | 3 | "86 the Waitresses" | Marc Daniels | Sybil Adelman | October 23, 1977 | 166668 |
| 28 | 4 | "Alice by Moonlight" | Kim Friedman | Tom Whedon | October 30, 1977 | 166669 |
| 29 | 5 | "Single Belles" | Kim Friedman | Bruce Howard | November 6, 1977 | 166670 |
| 30 | 6 | "The Sixty Minutes Man" | Kim Friedman | Story by : George Tibbles; Teleplay by : George Tibbles, Warren S. Murray and Tom Whedon | November 13, 1977 | 166666 |
| 31 | 7 | "That Old Back Magic" | William Asher | Robert Fisher & Arthur Marx | December 4, 1977 | 166671 |
| 32 | 8 | "Love Is Sweeping the Counter" | Kim Friedman | Arthur S. Rabin | December 11, 1977 | 166672 |
| 33 | 9 | "A Semi-Merry Christmas" | Marc Daniels | Madelyn Pugh Davis & Bob Carroll, Jr. and Tom Whedon | December 18, 1977 | 166674 |
| 34 | 10 | "Oh! George Burns" | Marc Daniels | Seaman Jacobs & Fred S. Fox | January 1, 1978 | 166675 |
| 35 | 11 | "The Eyes of Texas" | Kim Friedman | Robert Fisher & Arthur Marx | January 8, 1978 | 166673 |
| 36 | 12 | "Love Is a Free Throw" | Marc Daniels | Robert Fisher & Arthur Marx | January 11, 1978 | 166676 |
| 37 | 13 | "Close Encounters of the Worst Kind" | William Asher | Robert Fisher & Arthur Marx | January 22, 1978 | 166677 |
| 38 | 14 | "The Pharmacist" | Noam Pitlik | Story by : Michael Loman; Teleplay by : Michael Loman and Chris Hayward | January 29, 1978 | 166661 |
| 39 | 15 | "Love Me, Love My Horse" | William Asher | Tom Whedon | February 5, 1978 | 166678 |
| 40 | 17 | "Florence of Arabia" | Kim Friedman | Tom Whedon | February 19, 1978 | 166680 |
| 41 | 18 | "The Cuban Connection" | William Asher | Robert Fisher & Arthur Marx | February 26, 1978 | 166681 |
| 42 | 19 | "Mel's Big Five-0" | William Asher | Warren S. Murray | March 5, 1978 | 166679 |
| 43 | 20 | "Don't Lock Now" | William Asher | Tom Whedon | March 12, 1978 | 166682 |
| 44 | 21 | "The Star in the Storeroom" | Marc Daniels | Robert Fisher & Arthur Marx | March 19, 1978 | 166683 |
| 45 | 23 | "Mel's Recession" | William Asher | Robert Fisher & Arthur Marx and Tom Whedon | April 2, 1978 | 166684 |
| 46 | 24 | "Earthquake" | Noam Pitlik | Story by : Chris Hayward; Teleplay by : Chris Hayward and Gary Markowitz | April 9, 1978 | 166662 |
| 47 | 16 | "The Reporter" | Dennis Steinmetz | Michael Loman | Unaired | 166663 |
| 48 | 22 | "The Bus" | Marc Daniels | Story by : Chris Hayward; Teleplay by : Erik Tarloff | Unaired | 166664 |

=== Season 3 (1978–79) ===
| No. overall | No. in season | Title | Directed by | Written by | Original release date | Prod. code |
|---|---|---|---|---|---|---|
| 49 | 1 | "Take Him, He's Yours" | William Asher | Robert Fisher & Arthur Marx | September 24, 1978 | 166803 |
| 50 | 2 | "Car Wars" | William Asher | Robert Fisher & Arthur Marx | October 1, 1978 | 166801 |
| 51 | 3 | "Citizen Mel" | William Asher | Charles Isaacs | October 8, 1978 | 166807 |
| 52 | 4 | "Vera's Popcorn Romance" | William Asher | Tom Whedon | October 15, 1978 | 166808 |
| 53 | 5 | "Block Those Kicks" | William Asher | Robert Fisher & Arthur Marx | October 22, 1978 | 166804 |
| 54 | 6 | "What Happened to the Class of '78?" | William Asher | Tom Whedon | October 29, 1978 | 166806 |
| 55 | 7 | "Better Never Than Late" | William Asher | Tom Whedon | November 5, 1978 | 166802 |
| 56 | 8 | "Mel's in a Family Way" | William Asher | Story by : Jerry Winnick; Teleplay by : Jerry Winnick and Tom Whedon | November 11, 1978 | 166809 |
| 57 | 9 | "Who Ordered the Hot Turkey?" | William Asher | Tom Whedon | November 19, 1978 | 166810 |
| 58 | 10 | "The Happy Hoofers" | William Asher | Robert Fisher & Arthur Marx | November 26, 1978 | 166812 |
| 59 | 11 | "A Slight Case of ESP" | William Asher | Alan Rosen & Fred Rubin | December 3, 1978 | 166811 |
| 60 | 12 | "The Principal of the Thing" | William Asher | Robert Fisher & Arthur Marx | December 10, 1978 | 166805 |
| 61 | 13 | "What're You Doing New Year's Eve?" | Marc Daniels | Dawn Aldredge & Marion C. Freeman | December 31, 1978 | 166819 |
| 62 | 14 | "Sweet Charity" | William Asher | Robert Fisher & Arthur Marx | January 14, 1979 | 166813 |
| 63 | 15 | "The Fourth Time Around" | William Asher | Robert Fisher & Arthur Marx | January 21, 1979 | 166815 |
| 64 | 16 | "Tommy's First Love" | William Asher | Robert Fisher & Arthur Marx | January 28, 1979 | 166816 |
| 65 | 17 | "Mel Grows Up" | William Asher | Robert Fisher & Arthur Marx | February 4, 1979 | 166818 |
| 66 | 18 | "Vera's Broken Heart" | Lee Lochhead | Robert Fisher & Arthur Marx and Tom Whedon | February 18, 1979 | 166814 |
| 67 | 19 | "Alice's Decision" | Lee Lochhead | Robert Fisher & Arthur Marx and Tom Whedon | February 25, 1979 | 166817 |
| 68 | 20 | "The Last Stow It" | William Asher | Robert Fisher & Arthur Marx | March 11, 1979 | 166821 |
| 69 | 21 | "The Last Stow It" | William Asher | Robert Fisher & Arthur Marx | March 11, 1979 | 166822 |
| 70 | 22 | "If the Shoe Fits" | Marc Daniels | Tom Whedon and Charles Isaacs | March 18, 1979 | 166820 |
| 71 | 23 | "My Fair Vera" | William Asher | Robert Fisher & Arthur Marx | March 25, 1979 | 166823 |
| 72 | 24 | "Flo Finds Her Father" | William Asher | Dawn Aldredge & Marion C. Freeman | April 1, 1979 | 166824 |

=== Season 4 (1979–80) ===
| No. overall | No. in season | Title | Directed by | Written by | Original release date | Prod. code |
|---|---|---|---|---|---|---|
| 73 | 1 | "Has Anyone Here Seen Telly?" | Marc Daniels | Tom Whedon & Charles Isaacs and Robert Fisher & Arthur Marx | September 23, 1979 | 166936 |
| 74 | 2 | "Mona Lisa Alice" | Marc Daniels | Tom Whedon & Charles Isaacs | September 30, 1979 | 166932 |
| 75 | 3 | "Mel Loves Marie" | Marc Daniels | Robert Fisher & Arthur Marx | October 7, 1979 | 166931 |
| 76 | 4 | "Vera Robs the Cradle" | Marc Daniels | Robert Fisher & Arthur Marx | October 21, 1979 | 166933 |
| 77 | 5 | "Flo's Chili Reception" | Marc Daniels | Robert Fisher & Arthur Marx | October 28, 1979 | 166934 |
| 78 | 6 | "Little Alice Bluenose" | Marc Daniels | Tom Whedon & Charles Isaacs | November 4, 1979 | 166937 |
| 79 | 7 | "Carrie Sharples Strikes Again" | Lee Lochhead | Robert Fisher & Arthur Marx | November 11, 1979 | 166940 |
| 80 | 8 | "Mel's in the Kitchen with Dinah" | Norman Abbott | Tom Whedon & Charles Isaacs | November 18, 1979 | 166938 |
| 81 | 9 | "Cabin Fever" | Marc Daniels | Thad Mumford & Dan Wilcox | December 2, 1979 | 166935 |
| 82 | 10 | "My Cousin, Art Carney" | Lee Lochhead | Robert Fisher & Arthur Marx and Tom Whedon & Charles Isaacs | December 9, 1979 | 166942 |
| 83 | 11 | "Mel, the Magi" | Marc Daniels | Mark Egan & Mark Solomon | December 23, 1979 | 166945 |
| 84 | 12 | "Good Buddy Flo" | Marc Daniels | Linda Morris & Vic Rauseo | January 6, 1980 | 166943 |
| 85 | 13 | "Alice in TV Land" | Norman Abbott | Robert Fisher & Arthur Marx | January 13, 1980 | 166939 |
| 86 | 14 | "Alice Beats the Clock" | Marc Daniels | Katherine Green | January 27, 1980 | 166946 |
| 87 | 15 | "Carrie's Wedding" | Gary Shimokawa | Mark Egan & Mark Solomon | February 3, 1980 | 166941 |
| 88 | 16 | "My Funny Valentine Tux" | Marc Daniels | Tom Whedon & Charles Isaacs | February 10, 1980 | 166947 |
| 89 | 17 | "Auld Acquaintances Should Be Forgot" | Marc Daniels | Robert Fisher & Arthur Marx | February 17, 1980 | 166944 |
| 90 | 18 | "Flo's Farewell" | Marc Daniels | Robert Fisher & Arthur Marx | February 24, 1980 | 166948 |
| 91 | 19 | "For Whom the Belle Toils" | Marc Daniels | Linda Morris & Vic Rauseo | March 2, 1980 | 166949 |
| 92 | 20 | "One Too Many Girls" | Marc Daniels | Robert Fisher & Arthur Marx | March 9, 1980 | 166950 |
| 93 | 21 | "Vera, the Vamp" | Linda Lavin and Lee Lochhead | Linda Morris & Vic Rauseo | March 16, 1980 | 166951 |
| 94 | 22 | "Profit Without Honor" | Lee Lochhead | Robert Fisher & Arthur Marx | March 23, 1980 | 166952 |
| 95 | 23 | "Cook's Tour" | Linda Lavin and Lee Lochhead | Linda Morris & Vic Rauseo | March 30, 1980 | 166953 |
| 96 | 24 | "Here Comes Alice Cottontail" | Marc Daniels | Robert Fisher & Arthur Marx | April 6, 1980 | 166954 |

=== Season 5 (1980–81) ===
| No. overall | No. in season | Title | Directed by | Written by | Original release date | Prod. code |
|---|---|---|---|---|---|---|
| 97 | 1 | "Mel and the Green Machine" | Lee Lochhead | Linda Morris & Vic Rauseo | November 2, 1980 | 167201 |
| 98 | 2 | "Dog Day Evening" | Marc Daniels | George Arthur Bloom | November 9, 1980 | 167202 |
| 99 | 3 | "Hello Vegas, Goodbye Diner" | Marc Daniels | Mark Egan & Mark Solomon (part 1) | November 16, 1980 | 167203–167204 |
| 100 | 4 | "Hello Vegas, Goodbye Diner" | Marc Daniels | Linda Morris & Vic Rauseo (part 2) | November 16, 1980 | 167203–167204 |
| 101 | 5 | "Vera's Aunt Agatha" | Marc Daniels | Bob Fisher & Arthur Marx | November 23, 1980 | 167205 |
| 102 | 6 | "Tommy's TKO" | Marc Daniels | Linda Morris & Vic Rauseo | November 30, 1980 | 167206 |
| 103 | 7 | "The New Improved Mel" | Marc Daniels | Mark Egan & Mark Solomon | December 7, 1980 | 167207 |
| 104 | 8 | "Carrie Sings the Blues" | Christine Ballard & Linda Lavin | Mark Egan & Mark Solomon | December 21, 1980 | 167208 |
| 105 | 9 | "Henry's Bitter Half" | Lee Lochhead | Mark Egan & Mark Solomon | January 4, 1981 | 167209 |
| 106 | 10 | "Alice Locks Belle Out" | Nick Havinga | Bob Fisher & Arthur Marx | January 11, 1981 | 167210 |
| 107 | 11 | "Vera Goes Out on a Limb" | Marc Daniels | Linda Morris & Vic Rauseo | January 18, 1981 | 167211 |
| 108 | 12 | "The Jerry Reed Fish Story" | Marc Daniels | Bob Fisher & Arthur Marx | February 1, 1981 | 167214 |
| 109 | 13 | "Bye Bye, Birdie" | Marc Daniels | George Arthur Bloom | February 8, 1981 | 167213 |
| 110 | 14 | "Alice's Son, the Drop-Out" | Marc Daniels | Bob Fisher & Arthur Marx | February 15, 1981 | 167212 |
| 111 | 15 | "Carrie Chickens Out" | Marc Daniels | Bob Fisher & Arthur Marx | February 22, 1981 | 167215 |
| 112 | 16 | "Macho, Macho Mel" | Marc Daniels | Mark Egan & Mark Solomon | March 8, 1981 | 167216 |
| 113 | 17 | "The Great Escape" | Marc Daniels | Vic Rauseo & Linda Morris and Mark Egan & Mark Solomon | March 15, 1981 | 167217 |
| 114 | 18 | "Alice Strikes Up the Band" | Marc Daniels | Mark Egan & Mark Solomon | March 29, 1981 | 167218 |
| 115 | 19 | "Who's Kissing the Great Chef of Phoenix?" | Marc Daniels | Bob Fisher & Arthur Marx | April 5, 1981 | 167219 |
| 116 | 20 | "Baby Makes Five" | Christine Ballard & Linda Lavin | Charles Isaacs & Tom Whedon | May 3, 1981 | 167220 |

=== Season 6 (1981–82) ===
| No. overall | No. in season | Title | Directed by | Written by | Original release date | Prod. code |
|---|---|---|---|---|---|---|
| 117 | 1 | "Bet a Million, Mel" | Nick Havinga | Bob Fisher & Arthur Marx | October 4, 1981 | 167462 |
| 118 | 2 | "Guinness on Tap" | Marc Daniels | Mark Egan & Mark Solomon | October 11, 1981 | 167467 |
| 119 | 3 | "Comrade Mel" | Marc Daniels | Prudence Fraser & Robert Sternin | October 18, 1981 | 167466 |
| 120 | 4 | "Alice's Halloween Surprise" | Marc Daniels | Gail Honigberg | October 25, 1981 | 167464 |
| 121 | 5 | "Alice's Big Four-Oh!" | Marc Daniels | Linda Morris & Vic Rauseo | November 8, 1981 | 167463 |
| 122 | 6 | "Mel's Cousin, Wendell" | Marc Daniels | Mark Egan & Linda Morris & Vic Rauseo & Mark Solomon | November 15, 1981 | 167222 |
| 123 | 7 | "Vera's Bouncing Check" | Marc Daniels | Bob Brunner & Ken Hecht | November 29, 1981 | 167221 |
| 124 | 8 | "After Mel's Gone" | Stockton Briggle | Bob Bruner & Ken Hecht | December 6, 1981 | 167465 |
| 125 | 9 | "Mel's Christmas Carol" | Marc Daniels | Linda Morris & Vic Rauseo | December 20, 1981 | 167474 |
| 126 | 10 | "The Wild One" | Marc Daniels | Mike Weinberger | December 27, 1981 | 167461 |
| 127 | 11 | "Alice Calls the Shots" | Marc Daniels | Gail Honigberg | January 3, 1982 | 167469 |
| 128 | 12 | "Not with My Niece You Don't" | John Pasquin | Chet Dowling & Sandy Krinsky | January 17, 1982 | 167473 |
| 129 | 13 | "Vera, Queen of Soaps" | Marc Daniels | Mark Egan & Mark Solomon | January 31, 1982 | 167475 |
| 130 | 14 | "Sharples vs. Sharples" | Linda Day | Mark Egan & Mark Solomon | February 7, 1982 | 167472 |
| 131 | 15 | "The Valentine's Day Massacre" | John Pasquin | Mark Egan & Mark Solomon | February 14, 1982 | 167479 |
| 132 | 16 | "The Best Little Waitress in the World" | Mel Ferber | Linda Morris & Vic Rauseo | February 21, 1982 | 167471 |
| 133 | 17 | "Alice and the Acorns" | Marc Daniels | Mark Egan & Mark Solomon | March 7, 1982 | 167470 |
| 134 | 18 | "Jolene Hunnicutt, Dynamite Trucker" | Marc Daniels | Chet Dowling & Sandy Krinski | March 14, 1982 | 167476 |
| 135 | 19 | "Mel Wins By a Nose" | Marc Daniels | Linda Morris & Vic Rauseo | March 21, 1982 | 167480 |
| 136 | 20 | "Give My Regrets to Broadway" | John Pasquin | Gail Honigberg | April 4, 1982 | 167482 |
| 137 | 21 | "Vera's Reunion Romance" | Christine Ballard & Linda Lavin | Mark Egan & Gail Honigberg & Mark Solomon | April 11, 1982 | 167485 |
| 138 | 22 | "Monty Falls for Alice" | Marc Daniels | Mark Egan & Linda Morris & Vic Rauseo & Mark Solomon | April 18, 1982 | 167468 |
| 139 | 23 | "Spell Mel's" | Marc Daniels | Chet Dowling & Sandy Krinski | May 2, 1982 | 167477 |
| 140 | 24 | "My Mother the Landlord" | Marc Daniels | Chet Dowling & Sandy Krinski | May 16, 1982 | 167481 |

=== Season 7 (1982–83) ===
| No. overall | No. in season | Title | Directed by | Written by | Original release date | Prod. code |
|---|---|---|---|---|---|---|
| 141 | 1 | "Sorry, Wrong Lips" | Mel Ferber | Howard Liebling & Lloyd Turner | October 6, 1982 | 167625 |
| 142 | 2 | "Do You Take This Waitress?" | Christine Ballard & Linda Lavin | Gail Honigberg | October 13, 1982 | 167478 |
| 143 | 3 | "The Secret of Mel's Diner" | Marc Daniels | Chet Dowling & Sandy Krinski | October 20, 1982 | 167484 |
| 144 | 4 | "Alice at the Palace" | Marc Daniels | Mark Egan & Mark Solomon | October 27, 1982 | 167621 |
| 145 | 5 | "Joel Grey Saves the Day" | Marc Daniels | Mark Egan & Mark Solomon | November 3, 1982 | 167622 |
| 146 | 6 | "Alice's Turkey of a Thanksgiving" | Mel Ferber | Gail Honigberg | November 10, 1982 | 167630 |
| 147 | 7 | "Carrie on the Rebound" | Marc Daniels | Bob Bendetson & Howard Bendetson | January 9, 1983 | 167628 |
| 148 | 8 | "Jolene's Brother Jonas" | John Pasquin | David Silverman & Stephen Sustarsic | January 16, 1983 | 167626 |
| 149 | 9 | "Alice Sees the Light" | Marc Daniels | Bob Bendetson & Howard Bendetson | February 28, 1983 | 167637 |
| 150 | 10 | "Vera the Virtuoso" | Linda Lavin & John Pasquin | Robert Getchell & David Silverman & Stephen Sustarsic | March 7, 1983 | 167634 |
| 151 | 11 | "Alice Faces the Music" | Marc Daniels & Vic Tayback | Robert Getchell & David Silverman & Stephen Sustarsic | March 14, 1983 | 167639 |
| 152 | 12 | "Tommy, the Jailbird" | Mel Ferber | Robert Getchell & David Silverman & Stephen Sustarsic | March 21, 1983 | 167631 |
| 153 | 13 | "Jolene and the Night Watchman" | John Pasquin | Bob Bendetson & Howard Bendetson | March 28, 1983 | 167641 |
| 154 | 14 | "Mel's Dream Car" | John Pasquin | Barry Gold | April 11, 1983 | 167627 |
| 155 | 15 | "Come Back Little Sharples" | Mel Ferber | Gail Honigberg | April 17, 1983 | 167638 |
| 156 | 16 | "Vera, The Torch" | John Pasquin | Mark Egan & Mark Solomon | April 24, 1983 | 167642 |
| 157 | 17 | "The Grass is Always Greener" | Marc Daniels | Linda Morris & Vic Rauseo | May 1, 1983 | 167629 |
| 158 | 18 | "Tommy Fouls Out" | Marc Daniels | Michael Cassutt & Lew Levy | May 15, 1983 | 167623 |
| 159 | 19 | "Vera on the Lam" | Marc Daniels | Barry Gold | May 22, 1983 | 167632 |
| 160 | 20 | "Mel's Cousin Wendy?" | John Pasquin | Linda Morris & Vic Rauseo | May 29, 1983 | 167640 |
| 161 | 21 | "Sweet Erasable Mel" | John Pasquin | Betty Yahr | June 5, 1983 | 167635 |
| 162 | 22 | "Tommy Hyatt, Business Consultant" | Mel Ferber | Bob Bendetson & Howard Bendetson | June 12, 1983 | 167633 |
| 163 | 23 | "Jolene Lets the Cat Out of the Bag" | Don Corvan & Linda Lavin | Gail Honigberg | September 18, 1983 | 167636 |

=== Season 8 (1983–84) ===
| No. overall | No. in season | Title | Directed by | Written by | Original release date | Prod. code |
|---|---|---|---|---|---|---|
| 164 | 1 | "Mel is Hogg-Tied" | John Pasquin | Mark Egan & Mark Solomon | October 2, 1983 | 185206 |
| 165 | 2 | "Vera's Secret Lover" | Marc Daniels | Gail Honigberg | October 9, 1983 | 167624 |
| 166 | 3 | "Jolene Gets Her Wings" | Marc Daniels | Linda Morris & Vic Rauseo | October 16, 1983 | 185204 |
| 167 | 4 | "Alice's Blind Date" | Dolores Ferraro | Bob Stevens | October 23, 1983 | 185203 |
| 168 | 5 | "It Had to Be Mel" | Marc Daniels | Lindsay Harrison | October 30, 1983 | 185205 |
| 169 | 6 | "The Over-the-Hill Girls" | Tom Trbovich | Mark Egan & Mark Solomon | November 6, 1983 | 185208 |
| 170 | 7 | "Vera Gets Engaged" | Marc Daniels | Bob Bendetson & Howard Bendetson | November 20, 1983 | 185210 |
| 171 | 8 | "Vera's Wedding" | Marc Daniels | Story by : Mark Solomon; Teleplay by : Gail Honigberg | November 20, 1983 | 185211 |
| 172 | 9 | "The Robot Wore Pink" | Marc Daniels | Peter Noah | December 18, 1983 | 185212 |
| 173 | 10 | "'Tis the Season to Be Jealous" | Don Corbin & Linda Lavin | Bob Bendetson & Howard Bendetson | December 25, 1983 | 185214 |
| 174 | 11 | "Tommy Goes Overboard" | Oz Scott | Nick Gore & Jerry Jacobius | January 1, 1984 | 185201 |
| 175 | 12 | "Vera, the Horse Thief" | John Pasquin | Bob Bendetson & Howard Bendetson | January 8, 1984 | 185202 |
| 176 | 13 | "Jolene Throws a Curve" | Marc Daniels | Sid Dorfman & Harvey Weitzman | January 15, 1984 | 185213 |
| 177 | 14 | "Lies My Mother Told Me" | Marc Daniels | Sid Dorfman & Harvey Weitzman | January 29, 1984 | 185216 |
| 178 | 15 | "Alice and the Devoted Dentist" | Marc Daniels | Duncan Scott McGibbon | February 12, 1984 | 185209 |
| 179 | 16 | "Alice's Hot Air Romance" | Marc Daniels | Michael Cassutt | March 4, 1984 | 185220 |
| 180 | 17 | "Dollars to Donuts" | Oz Scott | David Silverman & Stephen Sustarsic | March 11, 1984 | 185207 |
| 181 | 18 | "My Dinner with Debbie" | Marc Daniels | Mark Egan & Mark Solomon | March 18, 1984 | 185218 |
| 182 | 19 | "Vera's Fine Feathered Friends" | Marc Daniels | David Silverman & Stephen Sustarsic | March 25, 1984 | 185215 |
| 183 | 20 | "Jolene is Stuck on Mel" | Don Corvan & Linda Lavin | Gail Honigberg | April 1, 1984 | 185219 |
| 184 | 21 | "Don't Play it Again, Elliott" | Marc Daniels & Nancy Walker | Larry Balmagia | April 15, 1984 | 185221 |
| 185 | 22 | "Mel Spins His Wheels" | Marc Daniels | Richard Marcus & Michael Poryes | May 13, 1984 | 185217 |
| 186 | 23 | "Be It Ever So Crowded" | Marc Daniels | David Silverman & Stephen Sustarsic | May 20, 1984 | 185222 |

=== Season 9 (1984–85) ===
| No. overall | No. in season | Title | Directed by | Written by | Original release date | Prod. code |
|---|---|---|---|---|---|---|
| 187 | 1 | "Romancing Mister Stone" | Marc Daniels | Cindy Begel & Lesa Kite | October 14, 1984 | 185574 |
| 188 | 2 | "Space Sharples" | Marc Daniels | Bob Bendetson & Howard Bendetson | October 28, 1984 | 185577 |
| 189 | 3 | "Big, Bad Mel" | Marc Daniels | David Silverman & Stephen Sustarsic | November 4, 1984 | 185571 |
| 190 | 4 | "Houseful of Hunnicutts" | Don Corvan | Lisa A. Bannick & Jack Carrerow | November 18, 1984 | 185576 |
| 191 | 5 | "Tommy's Lost Weekend" | Marc Daniels | Story by : Arnold Schmidt; Teleplay by : Bob Bendetson & Howard Bendetson | November 25, 1984 | 185578 |
| 192 | 6 | "Undercover Mel" | Marc Daniels | Linda Morris & Vic Rauseo | December 16, 1984 | 185580 |
| 193 | 7 | "Footloose Mel" | Lee Shallat Chemel | Bob Bendetson & Howard Bendetson | December 23, 1984 | 185573 |
| 194 | 8 | "Vera's Anniversary Blues" | Don Corvan | Lisa A. Bannick & Jack Carrerow | January 8, 1985 | 185579 |
| 195 | 9 | "Kiss the Grill Goodbye" | Nancy Walker | Cindy Begel & Lesa Kite | January 15, 1985 | 185582 |
| 196 | 10 | "Vera, the Nightbird" | Don Corvan | Linda Morris & Vic Rauseo | January 22, 1985 | 185581 |
| 197 | 11 | "Alice Doesn't Work Here Anymore: Part 1" | Don Corvan | David Silverman & Stephen Sustarsic | January 29, 1985 | 185583 |
| 198 | 12 | "Alice Doesn't Work Here Anymore: Part 2" | Don Corvan | Story by : Mark Solomon & Mark Egan; Teleplay by : Bob Bendetson & Howard Bendetson | February 5, 1985 | 185584 |
| 199 | 13 | "The Night They Raided Debbie's" | Nancy Walker | Mark Egan & Mark Solomon | February 6, 1985 | 185575 |
| 200 | 14 | "One on One" | Don Corvan | Linda Morris & Vic Rauseo | March 5, 1985 | 185585 |
| 201 | 15 | "Vera's Grounded Gumshoe" | Marc Daniels | Cindy Begel & Lesa Kite | March 12, 1985 | 185572 |
| 202 | 16 | "Th-th-th-that's All, Folks" | Don Corvan | Bob Carroll Jr. & Madelyn Davis | March 19, 1985 | 185586 |
