= Alfredo Fiorani =

Italian poet, writer

- Born: December 13, 1953 La Spezia, Italy
- Died: February 29, 2016 (aged 62) Lanciano, Italy

Alfredo Lucio Esposito, also known under the pseudonym of Alfredo Fiorani (December 13, 1953 – February 29, 2016), was an Italian poet, writer, essayist and man of letters.

== Biography ==
Born in La Spezia, but always lived in Abruzzo, in Sulmona and L'Aquila, he made his debut in fiction with the collection of short stories entitled "Con la 13^{a} ora cessò il vento delle campane" (Poggibonsi, 1982), followed by numerous works with which he has ranged from poetry to fiction, to non-fiction.

He has collaborated with literary magazines, online magazines and daily newspapers, including Oggi e Domani, Abruzzo letterario, L'erba d'Arno, La Nuova Gazzetta, Provincia Oggi, Novanta9, SuperMoney, Corretta Informazione.it, QN Quotidiano Nazionale, Il Centro, Il Resto del Carlino (Teramo edition).

As a publicist and literary critic he has dealt with Marco Vichi, Ernest Hemingway, Beppe Fenoglio, Raffaele La Capria and many others.

He edited the preface of the collection of poems "L'ora delle ombre" by Adelfina Cardarelli, contributed to the editing of Corrado Rea's lighting design book, and was also interested in emerging authors such as Adam Leve (pseudonym of Massimo Duronio), Roberto Michilli, Francesco Di Lauro and many others.

His critical remarks have been highly appreciated in the literary field and have been taken up by other authors in their own works.

Famous critics and writers have dealt with him, including Enrico Bagnato, Pietro Civitareale, Vittoriano Esposito, Simone Gambacorta, Walter Mauro, Vincenzo Moretti, Giampaolo Rugarli, Walter Tortoreto and Giorgio Bàrberi Squarotti.

=== His studies on Laudomia Bonanni ===
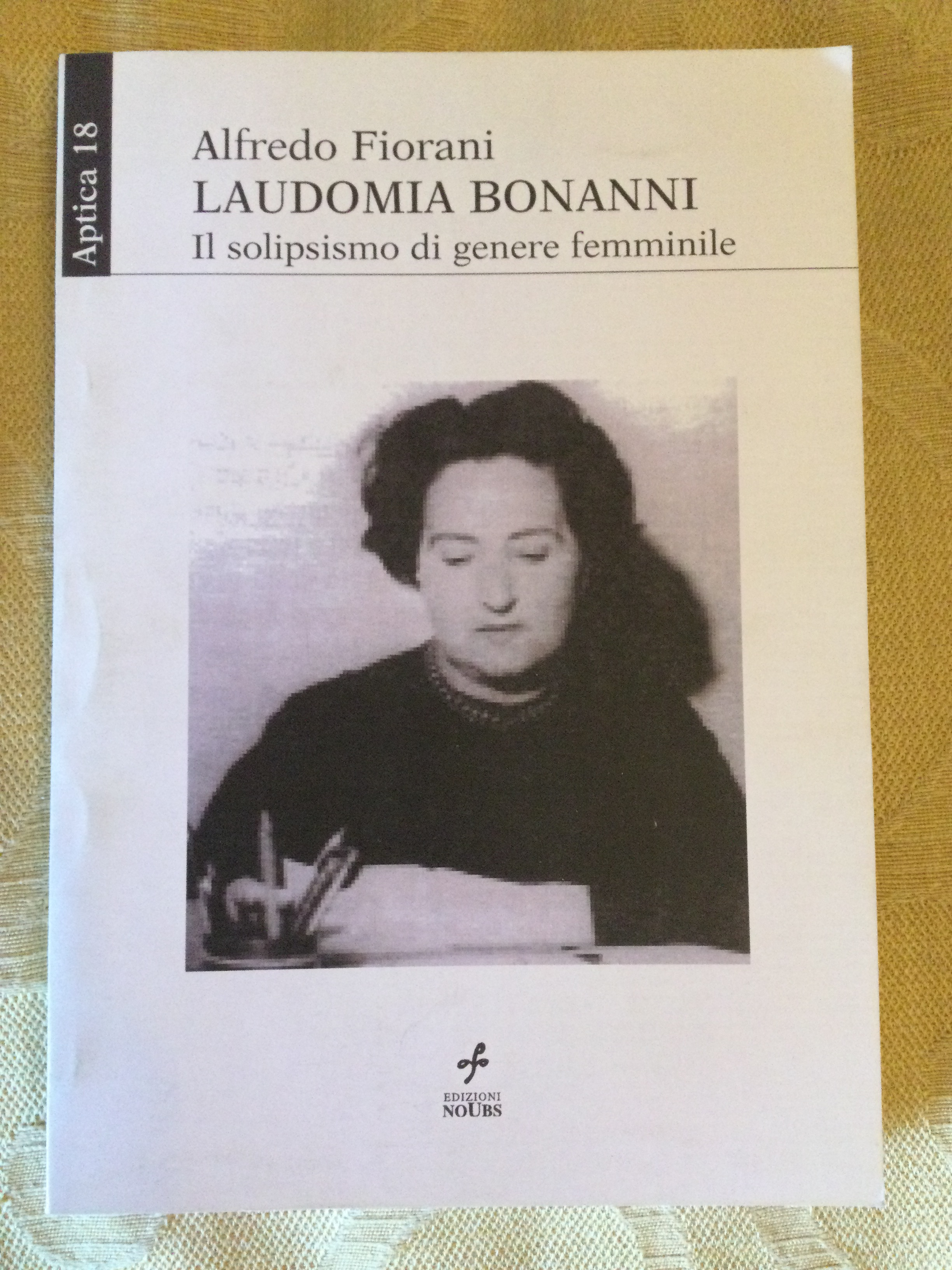
Alfredo Fiorani: “Laudomia Bonanni. Il solipsismo di genere femminile”

Between 2006 and 2007, together with the writer and literary critic Anna Maria Giancarli, with an open letter addressed to the mayor of L'Aquila, Biagio Tempesta, he promoted the initiative to dedicate an urban street to Laudomia Bonanni to «decree the tangible and imperishable recognition of an illustrious town, trying to recover, albeit belatedly, an indifference that no other municipality would have perpetrated for so long over time».

Elected as mayor Massimo Cialente, on December 8, 2007, on the centenary of the birth of Laudomia Bonanni, a commemorative plaque was affixed to number 75 in via Garibaldi where the illustrious writer from L'Aquila of the twentieth century had lived for decades.

Nonetheless, considering this recognition «a rather timid and insufficient remedial act, of which one cannot be considered satisfied», he continued to work to ensure that the administration that took office was interested and acted concretely «to give Bonanni the right and proper acknowledgment, especially in the light of the enormous renewed interest that is manifesting itself around his personal life and his precious and indispensable works».

His initiative, for which he spent almost a decade together with other well-known scholars and writers from L'Aquila, will then be realized only with the adoption of the Municipal Council Resolution n. 142 of March 14, 2017, a few months after his death, when Via Laudomia Bonanni will be established in the hamlet of Sassa.

His essay "Laudomia Bonanni. Il solipsismo di genere femminile" has returned to the attention of critics and readers otherwise impenetrable aspects of the writer, recreating the human and cultural climate in which the character moved, focusing on the role she attributed to women over the years. close to the Second World War.

=== The earthquake of April 6, 2009 ===
In the story-diary "La crudeltà dell'onda" he reported the experience he lived in first person, together with his partner Fausta, during the 2009 L'Aquila earthquake in which he suffered serious injuries to the head due to the collapses in his home in Via Santa Maria a Forfona, in the historic center, a stone's throw from the Basilica of San Bernardino, deciding to reach the hospital of Sulmona for the necessary treatments.

Having recovered, a few months later, in November 2009, he published the book "L'Aquila 2009: La mia verità sul terremoto", written jointly with Giampaolo Giuliani, the former technician of the Institute of Interplanetary Space Physics seconded to the Laboratori Nazionali del Gran Sasso, which became known for having allegedly predicted the occurrence of the seismic event.

In fact, Giampaolo Giuliani would seem to have foreseen an earthquake of significant magnitude, but in Sulmona, not in L'Aquila, and at the end of May, not on April 6: this had cost the technician a report for alarm – whose procedure is it was then archived in December 2009 by the Judge for preliminary investigations of Sulmona, Massimo Di Cesare, who accepted the request of the Public Prosecutor, Aura Scarsella – in addition to fierce criticism from the scientific community and the mass media.

The book "La forza della memoria" published in 2010, also written with Giampaolo Giuliani, is therefore a reprimand addressed to the official scientific community, guilty – in the opinion of the two authors – of having committed many errors of evaluation in the last three centuries as well as (would) have happened for the earthquake of L'Aquila.

Both books have had a wide echo in Italy, both for the well-known events that have determined and accompanied their publication, and for being serious and documented technical works.

=== The ecological commitment ===
On the occasion of the administrative elections of May 6 and 7, 2012 it joined the Sinistra Ecologia Libertà list in support of the candidate for mayor of the Municipality of L'Aquila, Massimo Cialente, for his second term.

Although unable to access the benches of the City Council, he continued his ecological commitment by dealing with climate issues with the aim of bringing the general public closer to ecological and environmental issues, coming to publish in June 2014 the essay "Contronatura. Il caos climatico" in which he conducted a journalistic and popular analysis of the events that in recent history have changed the approach to climate phenomena.

=== The latest writings on the Great War ===
In 2015 he published the book "L'immortalità delle vittime. Gli abruzzesi alla grande guerra", in which he collected memories and testimonies, trying to trace the impact that World War I had on Abruzzo and on the young people who sacrificed their existence for it.

In 2017 the essay "I prigionieri di guerra austro-ungarici nei campi di concentramento italiani" was published, written by him together with Edoardo Puglielli, in which the authors trace the story – little known to the general public – of the birth of the Romanian Legion of Italy and internment camps scattered in Abruzzo as in all of Italy, where men belonging to the most disparate linguistic-cultural groups were locked up to be used as agricultural, industrial and public utility workers, underpaid compared to local labor, or to be left to die of hardship and disease.

This latest historical essay will however be published after the author's death, which occurred following a long illness on February 29, 2016, in Lanciano.

== Works ==
=== Poetry ===
- Rimestando - Stirring – (Editrice Nuova Fortezza, Livorno, 1987)
- Derive – Drifts – (GTE – Gruppo Tipografico Editoriale – L'Aquila, 1995)
- Il silenzio del pastore scozzese – The silence of the Scottish Shepherd – (A. Fiorani Author, L'Aquila, 2012)

=== Storytelling ===
- Con la 13ª ora cessò il vento delle campane – With the 13th hour the wind of the bells ceased – (Poggibonsi, 1982)
- Il fiume e le stelle – The river and the stars – (Livorno, 1984)
- L'incantatrice orientale – The oriental enchantress – (Il vascello aereo, L'Aquila, 1994)
- L'orizzonte di Cheope - The horizon of Cheops – (Alfredo Guida Editore, Napoli, 1998)
- La memoria impura – The impure memory – (Edizioni Noubs, Chieti, 2001)
- Il sonno di Amleto – Hamlet's sleep – (in Una stagione di racconti, Casa editrice Rocco Carabba, Lanciano, 2005)
- All'amore il tempo – To the love the time – (Manni Editori, San Cesario di Lecce, 2007)

=== Non-fiction ===
- Penelope: il vissuto femminile e la scrittura – Penelope: female experience and writing – (Edizioni Noubs, Chieti, 1997)
- Laudomia Bonanni. Il solipsismo di genere femminile – Laudomia Bonanni. Solipsism of the female gender – (Edizioni Noubs, Chieti, 2007)
- L'Aquila 2009: la mia verità sul terremoto – L'Aquila 2009: my truth about the earthquake – (Castelvecchi, Roma, 2009)
- La forza della memoria. Dalla tragedia del terremoto ai ritardi nella ricostruzione: Giampaolo Giuliani denuncia i misfatti di una ricerca scientifica – The power of memory. From the tragedy of the earthquake to the delays in reconstruction: Giampaolo Giuliani denounces the misdeeds of scientific research – (Castelvecchi, Roma, 2010)
- Contronatura. Il caos climatico – Against nature. Climate chaos – (Europa Edizioni, Roma, 2014)
- L'immortalità delle vittime. Gli abruzzesi alla grande guerra – The immortality of the victims. The Abruzzese at the great war – (Di Felice Edizioni, Teramo, 2015)
- I prigionieri di guerra austro-ungarici nei campi di concentramento italiani – Austro-Hungarian prisoners of war in Italian concentration camps – (Di Felice Edizioni, Teramo, 2017)

=== Other monographs ===
- Whiteside: vincente – Whiteside: winning – (Unpublished winner of the Teramo Award in 1985)
- I giorni crudeli della congiura – The cruel days of the conspiracy – (Corriere Peligno)

=== Anthologies in which he is present with his works ===
- Sesto quaderno: Antologia Premio S. Penna (Campanotto Editore, Udine, 1995)

== Awards ==
- 1992 – 1st prize "Emigrazione" (section: journalism)
- 1993 – 1st prize poesia "Sandro Penna" VI edizione (Città della Pieve) for the unpublished collection "Incredulo canto solitario" - Incredulous solitary song – now in "Derive" – Drifts
- 1985 – 1st prize "Teramo" for an unpublished story (section: Mario Pomilio) for the short story "Whiteside: vincente" – Whiteside: winning
- 1996 – 1st prize "Arcadia '96 – Città de L'Aquila" (section: unpublished narrative)
- 1996 – 1st prize "Città di Pereto" (section: published book)
- 1998 – 1st prize "Città di Cimitile" (section: unpublished narrative) for the novel "L'orizzonte di Cheope" – The horizon of Cheops
- 1998 – 1st prize "Città di Lanciano – Eraldo Miscia" (unpublished story) for the story "Il sonno di Amleto" – Hamlet's sleep
- 2000 – 3rd prize "Histonium 2000 – Città di Vasto" (section: published)
- 2003 – 3rd prize "Cesare De Lollis – Casalincontrada" (section: published fiction)
- 2003 – finalist with silver medal – "San Marco" International Literary Prize (Sestri Levante) for the novel "La memoria impura" – The impure memory
- 2004 – 3rd prize "Cesare De Lollis – Casalincontrada" (section: unpublished poem)

== Bibliography ==
- Vittoriano Esposito, Alfredo Fiorani. Rimestando in Poesia non-poesia anti-poesia del ’900 italiano, Bastogi Editrice Italiana, Foggia, 1992
- Giuseppe Papponetti, Alfredo Fiorani. L'incantatrice orientale in Oggi e Domani, Year XXII, n. 6, June 1994
- Pietro Civitareale, Alfredo Fiorani. La memoria impura, in Rivista Abruzzese, Year LVI, n.1, January–March 2003
- Simone Gambacorta, Alfredo Fiorani. Il suo terzo romanzo in Silarus, Year XLIII, n. 226, March–April 2003
- Walter Tortoreto, Alfredo Fiorani. All'amore il tempo in La voce dell'emigrante, January 1, 2008
