= Frost and Fire =

Frost and Fire may refer to:

- "Frost and Fire" (short story), a short story by Ray Bradbury
- Frost and Fire (album), a 1981 album by the heavy metal band Cirith Ungol, or its title track
- Frost and Fire, the 1965 album by The Watersons
- "Frost and Fire", a song by Grand Magus from the 2016 album Sword Songs
- "Frost and Fire", a song by Manilla Road from the 2008 album Voyager
- Frost & Fire, a collection of short stories and essays by Roger Zelazny
- "Frost & Fire", the thirtieth episode of the fifth season of Adventure Time
