= Big Al and Shrimpy =

2002 picture book by Andrew Clements

- Author: Andrew Clements
- Illustrator: Yoshi Kogo
- Cover artist: Kogo
- Language: English
- Series: Big Al
- Genre: Children's book
- Published: 2002
- Publisher: Simon and Schuster
- Publication place: United States
- ISBN: 0-689-84247-3
- Preceded by: Big Al

Big Al and Shrimpy is the title of a 2002 children's picture book, written by Andrew Clements and illustrated by Yoshi Kogo. Published by Simon and Schuster in 2002, it is the sequel to the 1989 children's book Big Al.

== Reception ==
Kirkus Book Reviews wrote: " Yoshi again uses paint, batik, and embroidery to create blue-lit, deeply shadowed seascapes, populated by brightly colored tropical fish and flora. How Shrimpy persuades the other fish to follow him down into the Big Deep is never made clear, so the episode’s internal logic isn’t quite as watertight as that in Leo Lionni’s Swimmy (1966)—still, it’s good to see Big Al back, and children are always receptive to the idea that size isn’t everything." and "Clements gives the ugly-but-brave hero of Big Al (1990) a tiny-but-clever buddy in this companion volume."
