= Laudomia Bonanni =

Italian writer and journalist

- Born: 8 December 1907; L'Aquila, Italy
- Died: 21 February 2002 (aged 94); Rome, Italy
- Occupations: Novelist, journalist
- Writing career
- Notable awards: Premio Viareggio; 1960

Laudomia Bonanni (8 December 1907 – 21 February 2002) was an Italian writer and journalist. Although she started publishing when she was a teenager, her literary career took off in 1948 when she won a national contest; she went on to be a prolific and award-winning author. The Nobel laureate Eugenio Montale compared her realism to James Joyce’s Dubliners, and other distinguished critics considered her one of the most important and original voices in Italy’s post-World War II literature.

== Biography ==
Laudomia Bonanni was born in 1907 in L'Aquila, the capital city of the mountainous Abruzzo region of Central Italy, located about 60 miles northeast of Rome. Her parents were Giovanni, a musician turned coal merchant, and Amelia Perilli, a primary school teacher. They named her after a character in Niccoló de' Lapi (1841), a historical novel by Massimo D'Azeglio.

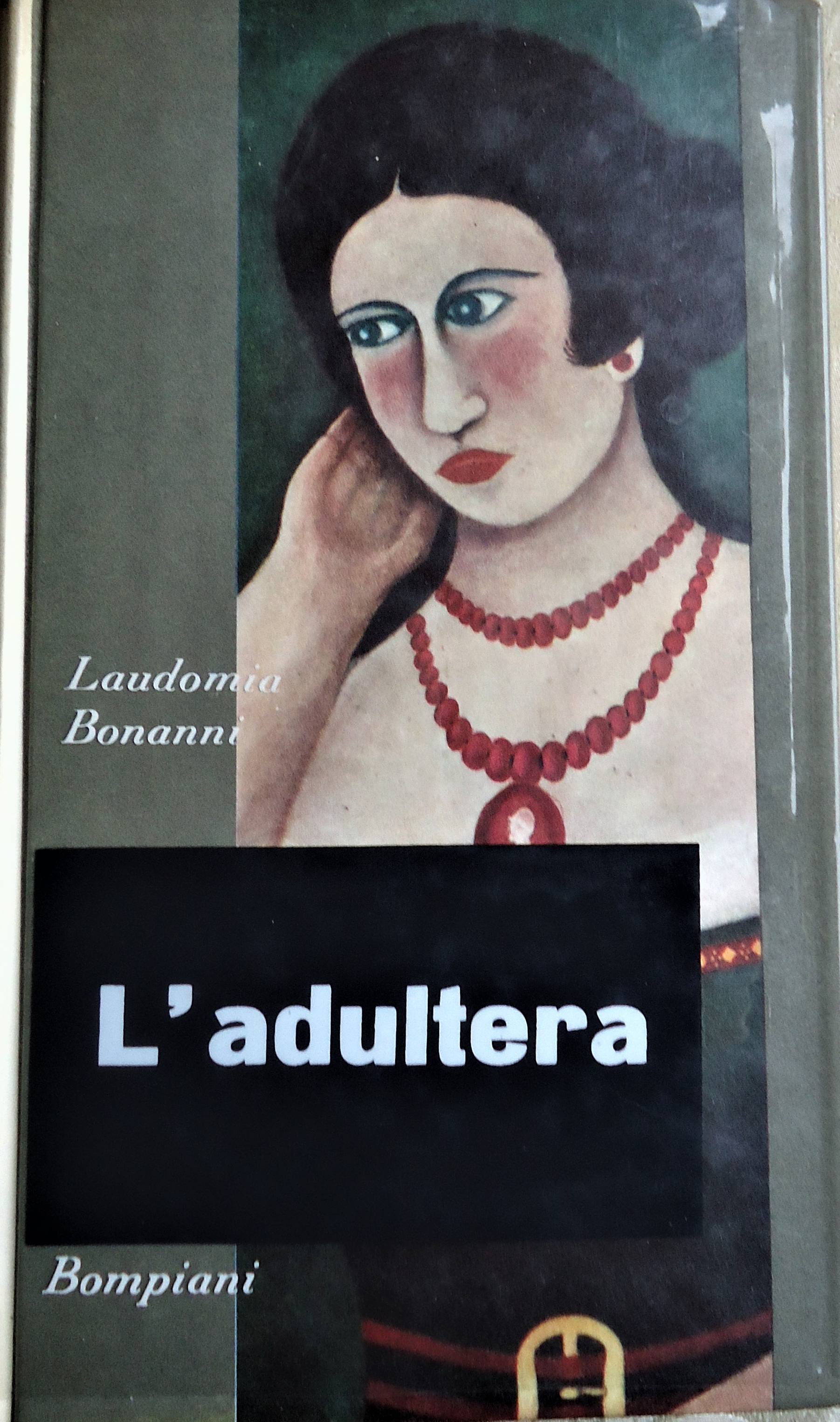
Laudomia Bonanni-L'Adultera-Bompiani 1964-copertina dipinto Orneore Metelli

After graduating from the Istituto magistrale in 1924, Bonanni taught in several village schools in the mountains around L’Aquila. She witnessed first-hand the hardships of village life before moving back to L'Aquila in 1930.

In 1927 Bonanni published her first collection of fiction, Storie tragiche della montagna, Novelle d’Abruzzo (Tragic Stories from the Mountains: Novellas of the Abruzzo), and some children's books. She continued to publish stories regularly and some collected works, but did not win national award recognition for her work until the post-World War II years.

In 1927 Bonanni also started working for literary magazines and newspapers. She continued to work in journalism until 1983, publishing more than 1,300 articles. She offered an extraordinary overview of contemporary society that displayed uncommon sensitivity to the problems of the lower classes. These writings reveal the extensive experience she gained over the years working as a consultant in the Juvenile Court in L’Aquila, where she served as a lay judge for nearly 20 years, between 1946 and 1964.

== Literary works ==
Bonanni’s literary works revolve around two main themes: one sociopolitical (focused on the marginalized and the oppressed in society) and a more introspective one (exploring the contradictions of bourgeois morality). The radical nature of her investigation gives Bonanni a unique and original style that distinguishes her voice from other twentieth-century writers. She also explored "the loss of childhood innocence; the Italian veneration of, and ambivalence toward, the power of maternity; the intricacy of human bonds in even the smallest of communities; the struggle against contingency in the poor mountain region that was her birthplace."

With two short stories gathered under the title Il fosso (The Ditch), in 1948 Laudomia Bonanni won a national literary contest for an unpublished work, sponsored by the Amici della Domenica, a Rome literary salon. It was hosted by the distinguished critic Goffredo Bellonci. Her work was selected by a committee that included prominent members of the contemporary Italian cultural elite. Poet and critic Eugenio Montale wrote of her two stories that won the contest: "...this Laudomia truly deserves to be brought out from the shadows. She reveals a narrative strength that must not be concluded here. She is sure to go a long way."

With the addition of the stories, "Funeral Mass" and "The Seed," a collection of four stories was published in 1949 as Il fosso by the prestigious press Mondadori. The following year Il fosso won another prize, the Premio Bagutta Opera Prima for a first book: this was the first time such a prize was awarded to a woman. Bonanni received critical acclaim; among her greatest admirers were prominent literary critics such as Emilio Cecchi, Giuseppe de Robertis, and Enrico Falqui.

In 1954 Laudomia Bonanni’s Palma e sorelle (Palma and Sisters) won the Premio Soroptimist. Her next novels, L’imputata (The Accused) and L’adultera (The Adulteress), both published with Bompiani, received two important literary awards, respectively the Premio Viareggio (1960) and the Premio Selezione Campiello (1964). Both works were translated into French and Spanish.

In 1966 Boanni retired from teaching, eventually moving to Rome where she planned to join the literary circles like the Salotto Bellonci. But interest in her work faded, and she withdrew into depression and solitary isolation.

After a long silence, in the late 1970s, she published "Città del tabacco" ("Tobacco City", 1977), followed by two novels: Il bambino di pietra (The Stone Baby, 1979) and Le droghe (The Drugs, 1982). She also collected the short stories inspired by her experiences in the Juvenile Court, publishing them as Vietato ai minori (Forbidden to Minors, 1974). Bonanni was a finalist for the Strega Prize three times (in 1960, 1974, and 1979).

She completed La rappresaglia, (The Reprisal) in 1985. When the publisher Bompiani asked her to revise her last manuscript, she refused and retired into solitude.

Bonanni died at 94, almost forgotten. The posthumous publication of La rappresaglia (The Reprisal) (by Textus, L’Aquila, in 2003) attracted attention, as it dealt with World War II resistance and partisans in Abruzzo, framed within a highly structured narrative. Bonanni may have written most of the novel decades earlier and revised it over a long period. "That extended, ambiguous gestation period and the equally ambiguous but suggestive correlations between the novel and Bonanni’s own experience in the Second World War" have added to it.

At the same time, Il fosso and L’imputata were reprinted, and scholarly interest in her works has revived, including new perspectives from feminism and postwar literature. The Reprisal is the first of Bonanni's works to be translated into English; it was published in the United States by the University of Chicago Press in 2013. According to reviewer Steve Himmer, its "uncomfortable, unresolvable balance makes The Reprisal a challenging, bleak, and haunting read—and a vital one."

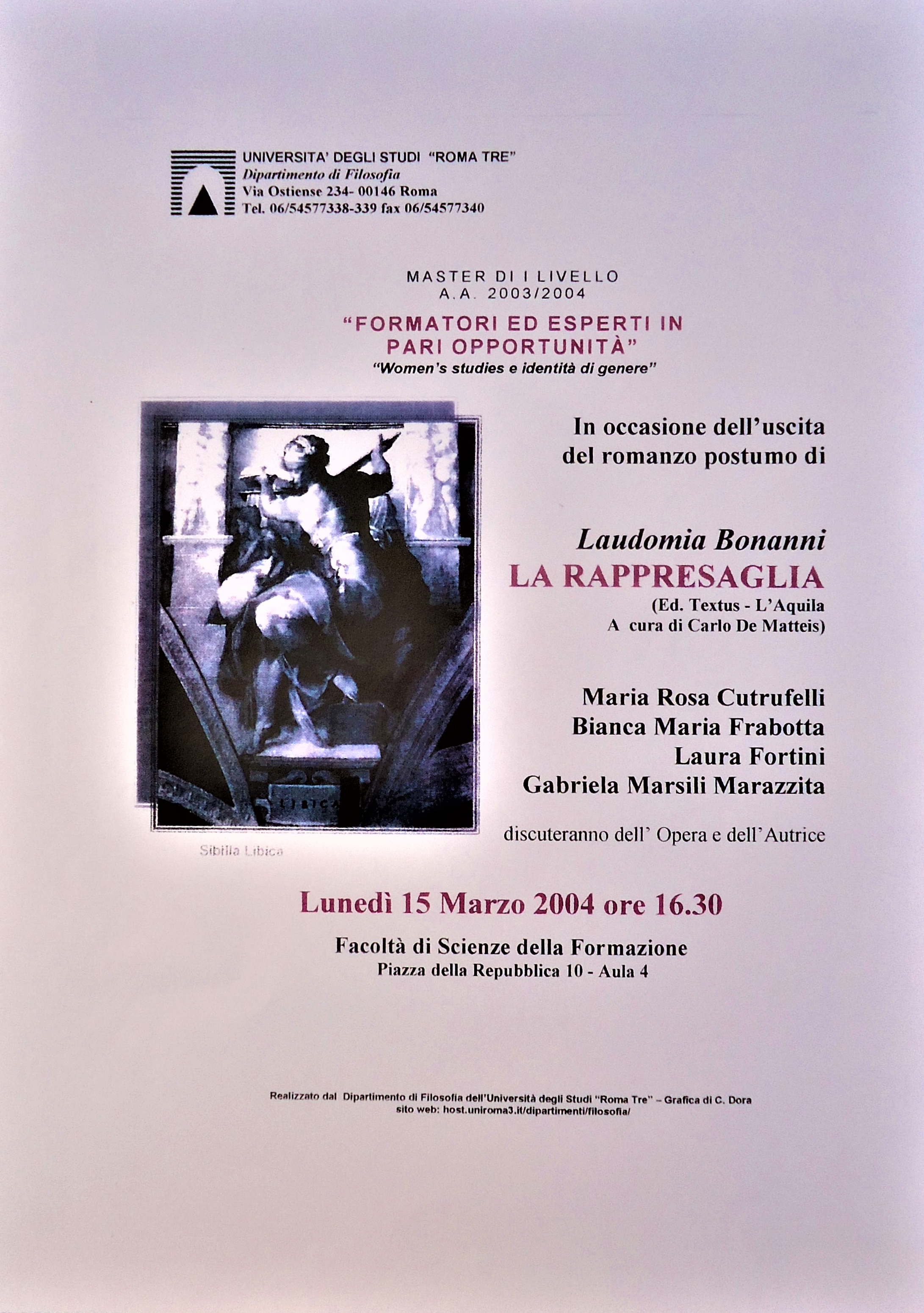
Laudomia Bonann, La rappresaglia, Master University Roma Tre, 2004

== Legacy and honours ==
- 1948, won a national literary contest for an unpublished work; awarded by the Amici della Domenica, with the publication of her Il fosso, a collection of four stories, in 1949
- 1950, won the Premio Bagutta Opera Prima for Il fosso
- 1954, won the Premio Soroptimist for her first novel, Palma e sorelle (Palma and Sisters)
- 1960, won the Premio Viareggio for L'imputata
- 1964, won the Premio Selezione Campiello for L'adultera
- Finalist for the Strega Prize in 1960, 1974, and 1979.

== Works ==
- Storie tragiche della montagna, Novelle d'Abruzzo, Vecchioni, L'Aquila 1927.
- Il canto dell'acqua, Ires, Palermo 1928.
- Il pesco vestito di rosa, Ires, Palermo 1928.
- Noterelle di cronaca scolastica, Vecchioni, L'Aquila 1932
- Damina Celina ed altri racconti, Bemporad, Firenze 1935.
- Men, avventura al Nuovo Fiore, Milano, Bompiani, 1939.
- Le due penne del pappagallino Verzè, Paravia, Torino 1948.
- Il fosso, Mondadori, Milano 1949.
- Palma e Sorelle, Casini, Roma 1954.
- L'imputata, Bompiani, Milano 1960.
- Proceso a una mujer (L'imputata), Vergara, Barcelona 1962.
- L'adultera, Milano, Bompiani, 1964.
- L'adultère (L'adultera), Albin Michel, Paris 1965.
- L'inculpée (L'imputata), Albin Michel, Paris, 1965.
- Palma e Sorelle, reprint including the collection Il fosso, Bompiani, Milano 1968.
- Vietato ai minori, Bompiani, Milano 1974.
- Città del tabacco, Bompiani, Milano, 1977.
- Il bambino di pietra, Bompiani, Milano 1979.
- Le droghe, Milano, Bompiani, Milano 1982.
- La rappresaglia, Textus, L'Aquila 2003.
- Il fosso, reprint, Textus, L'Aquila 2004.
- L'imputata, reprint, Textus, L'Aquila, 2007
- Epistolario, vol.1, edited by Fausta Samaritani, Rocco carabba, Lanciano, 2006.
- Elzeviri, edited by Anna Maria Giancarli, Edizioni Tracce, Pescara, 2007.

== Bibliography ==
=== Texts ===
- Maria Bellonci, Come ti racconto gli anni del Premio Strega (Milano: Club degli Editori, 1969).
- Cesare De Matteis – Introduzione a La rappresaglia in L. Bonanni, La rappresaglia, pp. 148, Textus, L'Aquila 2003.
- Gianfranco Giustizieri – "Io che ero una donna di domani" – In viaggio tra gli scritti di Laudomia Bonanni ("I, who was a woman of tomorrow " - A journey through the writings of Laudomia Bonanni), pp. 166, illustrato, Edizioni del Consiglio Regionale dell'Abruzzo, L'Aquila 2008.
- Gianfranco Giustizieri – "Laudomia scrittrice senza tempo" – Secondo viaggio tra gli scritti di Laudomia Bonanni, Carabba, Lanciano 2010.
- Goffredo Palmerini, Laudomia Bonanni, una scrittrice senza tempo, Abruzzo24ore.com, 9/15/2010
- Sandra Petrignani – Le signore della scrittura, La Tartaruga, Milano 1984.
- Fausta Samaritani – (a cura di) - Laudomia Bonanni – Epistolario Vol. I, pp. 266, Carabba, Lanciano, 2006.
- Fausta Samaritani – “Nel salotto Bellonci nasce una scrittrice”, Inabruzzo.com, 11/8/2011
- Fausta Samaritani - (a cura di) – Laudomia Bonanni, Epistolario, Vol. II (CD-ROM)
- Pietro Zullino – La vita e l'opera di Laudomia Bonanni. Roma 2002, edizione privata
- Alfredo Fiorani - Laudomia Bonanni. Il solipsismo di genere femminile. Chieti 2007, Noubs Edizioni.

=== Documentaries ===
- Io che ero una donna di domani (I, who was a woman of tomorrow), produced by Rai Educational, written by Loredana Rotondo, directed by Lucia Luconi, 2007.
- Come se il fiore nascesse dalla pietra: omaggio a Laudomia Bonanni (As if the flower was born from the stone: homage to Laudomia Bonanni), documentary by Accademia di Belle Arti dell'Aquila, written by Patrizia Tocci, directed by Carlo Nannicola, 2007.
