= Happiness Is Just a Little Thing Called a Rolls Royce =

American comedy premiered in 1968

Happiness is Just a Little Thing Called a Rolls-Royce
- Original language: English
- Written by: Arthur Alsberg; Robert Fisher
- Genre: comedy
- Setting: New York. The past, the present and the future.

Premiere
- Date: May 8, 1968
- Place: Ethel Barrymore Theatre

Happiness is Just a Little Thing Called a Rolls-Royce is an American play. It ran for 4 previews and one performance. It was written by Arthur Alsberg and Robert Fisher who had worked together in television.

The play was profiled in the William Goldman book The Season: A Candid Look at Broadway. Goldman commented that the play:

Had all the time-proven materials of the sex-comedy genre, and I think that if the time were 40 years ago, it might have had an enormous success. The dedicated: young painter, a girl on her own: that was an exciting twenties notion. And the fact that this wacky but honest girl put out; well, you’ve got something there. That would have been good for a season’s run 40 years ago. But the by-now paralyzing familiarity, I think, killed it. Plus the fact that the basic notion—a man buys a Rolls-Royce—is kind of limited.

== Premise ==
A young lawyer buys a Rolls Royce for his pushy wife. In the back is a young female artist.

== Cast of Broadway run ==
- Lee Bergere as Phil Gorshin
- Alexandra Berlin as Andrea Clithero
- Hildy Brooks as Myra Bagley
- Phoebe Dorin as Karen Kinsey
- Ray Fulmer as Jerry Ramsey
- Pat Harrington as Walter Bagley
- Marvin Lichterman as Chuck Kinsey
- John McGiver as Andrew McIntire
- Shimen Ruskin as Sanford Rutchik
