= Alice (American TV series) =

American television sitcom (1976–1985)

- Title card 1976–1978
- Created by: Robert Getchell
- Based on: Alice Doesn't Live Here Anymore by Robert Getchell
- Starring: Linda Lavin; Vic Tayback; Beth Howland; Polly Holliday; Philip McKeon; Diane Ladd; Celia Weston; Charles Levin
- Theme music composer: David Shire (music); Alan and Marilyn Bergman (lyrics)
- Opening theme: "There's a New Girl in Town" by Linda Lavin
- Country of origin: United States
- Original language: English
- No. of seasons: 9
- No. of episodes: 202 (list of episodes)

Production
- Executive producers: R.S. Allen; William P. D'Angelo; Harvey Bullock; Thomas Kuhn; David Susskind
- Running time: 22–25 minutes
- Production companies: D'Angelo-Bullock-Allen Productions; Warner Bros. Television

Original release
- Network: CBS
- Release: August 31, 1976 – March 19, 1985

Related
- Flo

Alice is an American sitcom television series that aired on CBS from August 31, 1976, to March 19, 1985. The series is based on director Martin Scorsese's 1974 film Alice Doesn't Live Here Anymore. The show stars Linda Lavin as Alice Hyatt, a widow who moves with her young son to start life over again and finds a job working at a roadside diner in Phoenix, Arizona. Most of the episodes revolve around events at Mel's Diner, where Alice is employed.

With more than 200 episodes over nine seasons, Alice was the longest-running American television sitcom to feature a woman in the starring role until it was surpassed by Roseanne in 1996.

== Series summary ==
After her husband Donald is killed in a trucking accident, Alice Spivak Hyatt (Lavin) and her young son Tommy (played by Alfred Lutter in the television pilot, reprising his role from the film, but portrayed by Philip McKeon thereafter) head from their New Jersey home to Los Angeles so Alice can pursue a singing career. Her car breaks down in Phoenix, and viewers meet her soon after she has taken a job as a waitress at Mel's Diner. (The later seasons' exterior shots were of a real diner, named Mel's, still in operation in Phoenix.) Alice works alongside Mel Sharples (Vic Tayback), the grouchy, stingy owner and cook of the greasy spoon, and fellow waitresses and friends, sassy, man-hungry Florence Jean "Flo" Castleberry (Polly Holliday), and neurotic, scatterbrained Vera Louise Gorman (Beth Howland).

Most scenes took place inside the diner, or less often in Alice's one-bedroom apartment in the Desert Sun apartment complex. Vera and Mel's studio apartments and Flo's trailer were occasionally seen. Two of the diner's biggest competitors – Barney's Burger Barn and Vinnie's House of Veal – were sometimes mentioned.

The diner had regular customers through the years, such as Tommy's basketball coach Earl Hicks (Dave Madden), local trucker Chuck (played by Duane R. Campbell), and Henry Beesmeyer (Marvin Kaplan), a telephone repairman who always joked about Mel's cooking. Henry's oft-mentioned wife Chloe was seen in one episode, played by Ruth Buzzi. Celebrities playing either themselves or other characters (including Martha Raye as Mel's free-spirited mother, George Burns, Robert Goulet, Art Carney, Desi Arnaz, Jerry Reed, and Telly Savalas) were a hallmark of the show.

Polly Holliday left the show to star in her own spin-off series, Flo. In the episode airing February 24, 1980, Flo leaves to take a hostess job in Houston. On the way to Houston, Flo stops at her hometown, Fort Worth, Texas (which she refers to by its moniker "Cowtown"). Flo decides to buy and run a failing roadhouse bar there, which she renames Flo's Yellow Rose. Polly Holliday never made a guest appearance on Alice after beginning Flo (flashbacks including Flo were shown in the final episode of Alice). Vic Tayback made one guest appearance on Flo.

Diane Ladd, who received an Academy Award nomination for her portrayal of Flo in the film version, joined the cast in 1980 as Isabelle "Belle" Dupree, a hard-edged but kind-hearted woman. She had been a waitress of Mel's in the past, during which the two had a romantic relationship. Despite Ladd's Golden Globe-winning performance as Belle, the character was not retained for the duration of the series and was replaced early in 1981, the character making one last appearance in which she telephones the diner to inform everyone that she had taken a job as a backup singer in Nashville, Tennessee. Ladd left the $400,000 yearly job, saying it was an amicable and mutual decision, because her character hadn't developed the way she had hoped it would.

Season 8: Linda Lavin (Alice), Celia Weston (Jolene), and Beth Howland (Vera)

Theatre actress Celia Weston then joined the cast as the good-natured, boisterous truck driver Jolene Hunnicutt, who came from Myrtle Point, South Carolina. Jolene arrives as she and her male driving partner are in the midst of an argument over his unwelcome advances, during which she throws and breaks many of Mel's dishes. Mel agrees to hire her "temporarily" to work off the cost of the dishes, but she stays until the end of the series. Jolene frequently mentions her grandmother, "Granny Gums", who had only three or four teeth. Jolene also mentions her distant relative Jefferson Davis "Boss" Hogg, a character from the concurrent CBS series and fellow Warner Brothers production The Dukes of Hazzard. In one episode Sorrell Booke guest stars as Hogg, along with fellow Dukes character Enos (Sonny Shroyer). Boss Hogg was related to Jolene because Jolene's "Granny Gums" was from his side of the family.

The latter years of the show focused on some character development, such as the hasty courtship and marriage of Vera and lovable cop Elliot (Charles Levin). Tommy eventually goes to college and is seen less frequently. In the final season, the character of Alice was absent several times due to Lavin directing a number of episodes and playing the character of Mrs. Walden, Vera's wizened, abrasive landlady of arbitrary foreign origin, in two episodes. The final story arc began in the spring of 1985, when Steve Marsh's country singer cousin Travis Marsh (played by Lavin's real-life husband Kip Niven), discovering that he is falling for Alice, "kidnaps" her to take her to Nashville, telling her it is time to follow her dream there. Bewildered at the thought of her dreams finally coming true, Alice agrees, but not without extracting a promise from Travis to drive her back to Phoenix so she can get her affairs in order, including ending her current relationship with a writer.

In the series finale, which aired March 19, 1985, news of several life-changing events is revealed within a matter of minutes, something typical of sitcoms of the era. After nine years of trying, Alice finally gets a recording contract and is moving to Nashville with Travis. Vera announces she is pregnant and decides to be a full-time mother, Elliott having been promoted from officer to detective. Jolene's "Granny Gums" dies and leaves her enough money to open her own beauty parlor in her hometown. Besides all three waitresses suddenly leaving simultaneously, by an amazing coincidence Mel has just sold the diner for a large amount of money to a real-estate developer and must close within days. On closing day, he surprisingly gives each waitress a $5,000 farewell bonus. The remainder of the episode shows flashbacks to humorous and significant events, and many of the stars who had appeared on the show, including Polly Holliday. Belle (Diane Ladd) was not featured in any of the finale flashbacks. Finally, while cleaning out her locker, Alice finds the "Waitress Wanted" sign that first drew her to the diner. The series' regular customers, including Henry, Chuck, and Earl, say their emotional farewells, followed by Elliot, and finally the principal characters Tommy, Jolene, Vera, and Alice. The last thing we see is Mel putting up the "Closed" sign and locking up before leaving.

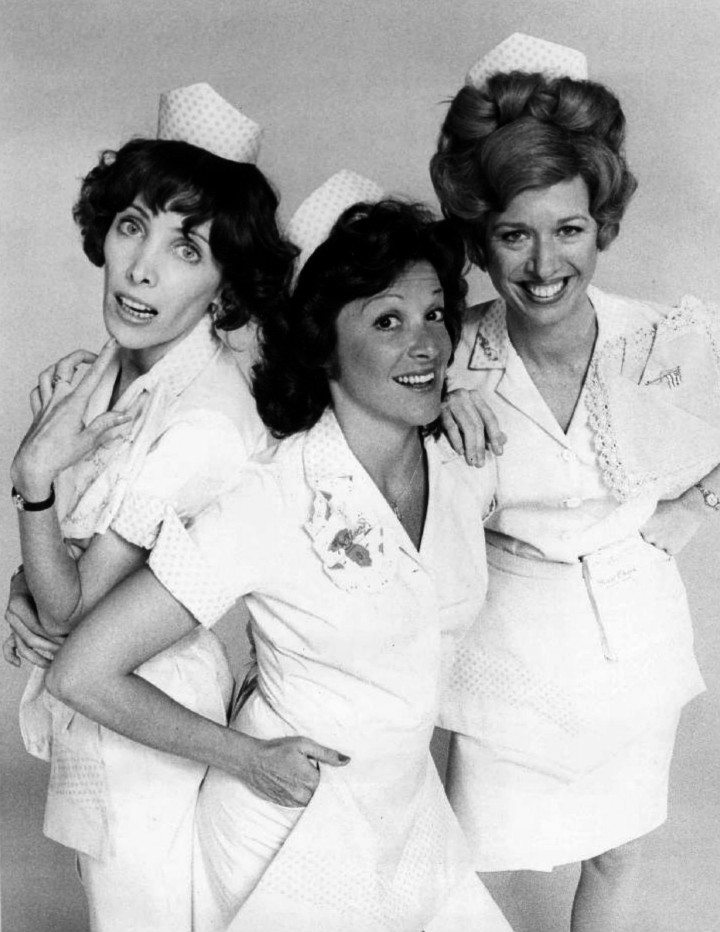
The waitresses at Mel's Diner from left: Vera (Beth Howland), Alice (Linda Lavin), Flo (Polly Holliday)

== Running gags and catchphrases ==
Flo's catchphrase, "kiss my grits!" (typically directed at her boss, Mel), enjoyed widespread popularity at the time the character appeared on Alice. According to Polly Holliday, the line was originally written as "kiss my honeydew!", but did not get any laughs. (In the original film, Flo, as played by Diane Ladd, tells Mel in one scene to "Kiss me where the sun don't shine.") Another of Flo's catchphrases was "when donkeys fly!"

In an attempt to duplicate the success of Flo's "kiss my grits!", Belle began using a new put-down: "butter my biscuits!" Belle often used the phrase "my little voice", who called her "Isabelle", which she usually used when starting to tell others what she thinks is best.

Mel would snipe "stow it!" at anyone he had qualms with, especially his waitstaff. "Stow it!" was usually followed by either "Alice", "Vera", "Flo" "Belle", or "Blondie" (in reference to Jolene). He would also bark "bag it, Blondie!" to Jolene. He eventually gave Vera the nickname "Dingy" and would occasionally bellow "stow it, Dingy" at her. Jolene would sometimes say "when pigs wear perfume."

In a handful of episodes, Alice put on a double-breasted suit and fedora to assume the character of husky-voiced "Sam Butler", a mobster she made up as a ruse to fool her intended target (and in at least one episode, Vera also dresses up to become one of "Sam's" henchmen). Linda Lavin also played the role of Mrs. Walden in the last season, once even playing both Alice and Mrs. Walden in a split-screen dual role.

Parts of Mel's Diner were often destroyed, such as Flo's crashing a truck through the front, Mel chopping down a tree which landed on the diner, Mel accidentally having the building targeted for demolition, and the waitresses crashing a hot air balloon through the roof (upon which Jolene cries, "we went to the bad place and it looks just like Mel's!"). In one episode, a wrecking ball destroyed the front of the diner because someone could not read Mel's handwriting. In another, a group of men literally hoisted up the entire front of the diner with their bare hands.

Mel was a stickler for punctuality. In the fourth season, he installed a time clock, which ended up working to the waitresses' advantage due to significant overtime (since before then they were forced to clean the storage room on Sundays without extra pay), and he finally smashed it onto the floor. Mel also had a strict rule against moonlighting, often leading to one or more waitresses getting fired, but he always rehired them before the end of each episode.

Although he had a fairly loyal clientele, Mel's food and cooking were constantly criticized by his waitresses and customers alike —especially Henry, who always blamed it for his indigestion. However, Mel's chili con carne was popular and became a plot point of several episodes. During the first season, a newspaper food critic (played by Victor Buono) dropped dead while eating Mel's chili, but it turned out that tainted Peking Duck from a Chinese restaurant was to blame. Art Carney guest-starred in one episode as the spokesman for retail distribution of Mel's Chili ("Chili con Carney") who backed out when he discovered Vera was a distant relative with part ownership in the venture. The popularity of Mel's Chili also led to an appearance on Dinah Shore's talk show, which led to some bickering among the waitresses because Mel could take only one person along, but everyone ended up going. Mel refused to reveal his "secret ingredient" to Dinah and her TV audience during the cooking demonstration.

== Cast of characters ==
=== Main characters ===
Opening title cast members:

- Linda Lavin as Alice Hyatt, an aspiring singer who becomes a waitress at Mel's diner.
- Vic Tayback as Melvin Emory "Mel" Sharples, the stingy and grouchy owner of Mel's Diner. He would often bark orders at the waitresses and come up with money-making schemes. Mel is often a terrible cook with his cooking criticized by the other characters as mentioned above. Tayback reprised his role from the film.
- Philip McKeon as Tommy Hyatt, the son of Alice. Alfred Lutter had reprised his role from the film, but was replaced by McKeon after the pilot episode
- Polly Holliday as Florence Jean "Flo" Castleberry, the boy-hungry waitress at Mel's diner (Seasons 1–4: 1976–1980)
- Beth Howland as Vera Louise Gorman Novak, the scatterbrained waitress at Mel's diner
- Diane Ladd as Isabelle "Belle" Dupree, an original waitress at Mel's diner who briefly returns to work there (Seasons 4–5: 1980–1981). Ladd played the role of Flo in the film.
- Celia Weston as Jolene Hunnicutt, a former truck driver who becomes a waitress at Mel's diner (Seasons 5–9: 1981–1985)
- Charles Levin as Elliot Novak, a police officer who Vera gets engaged to (Season 8 recurring, Season 9 regular: 1983–85)

=== Recurring characters ===
Other recurring cast members are listed in order of appearance:

- Pat Cranshaw as Andy, a diner regular (1976–1978)
- Tom Mahoney as Travis (1977)
- Robert Hogan as Greg Stemple (1977–1982)
- Marvin Kaplan as Henry Beesmeyer, a diner regular who worked for the phone company (1977–1985)
- Dave Madden as Earl Hicks, a basketball coach to Tommy, date to Flo, and a diner customer (1978–1985)
- Victoria Carroll as Marie Massey, Mel's girlfriend (1978–1984)
- Martha Raye as Carrie Sharples, Mel's free-spirited mother (1978–1984)
- Duane R. Campbell as Chuck, a diner regular (1978–1985)
- Ted Gehring as Charlie, a diner regular (1979–1982)
- Alan Haufrect as Brian, a diner regular (1978–1980)
- Patrick J. Cronin as Jason, a diner regular (1976–1980)
- Doris Roberts as Mona Spivak, Alice's mother and Tommy's grandmother (1981–1982)
- Kip Niven as Steve Marsh, a country singer who briefly falls in love with Alice (1981–1985)
- Tony Longo as Artie, a security guard and diner regular who is not very bright (1981–1984)
- Robert Picardo as Officer Maxwell, a police officer and Elliott's partner (1982–1984)

=== Notable guest stars ===
Notable guest stars include:

- Eve Arden
- Desi Arnaz
- Brice Beckham
- Fred Berry
- Sorrell Booke as Boss Hogg from The Dukes of Hazzard, he is depicted as a distant relative of Jolene.
- George Burns as himself
- Ruth Buzzi as Chloe Beesmeyer, Henry's wife who is often talked about in the series
- Candace Cameron
- Art Carney as himself
- Corey Feldman
- Robert Goulet as himself
- Joel Grey as himself
- Florence Halop
- Eileen Heckart as Rose Hyatt, Alice's interfering mother in-law
- Florence Henderson
- Jay Leno
- Bill Maher
- Helen Martin
- Rue McClanahan
- Nancy McKeon, who is Philip's real-life sister, appeared twice in different roles. She appeared as a girl orphan in "Who Ordered the Hot Turkey?" and as Kimberly in "Alice's Halloween Surprise" who is the daughter of Alice's boyfriend Mitch.
- Frank Nelson
- Donald O'Connor as himself
- Janis Paige
- Kelly Parsons
- Jerry Reed as himself
- Debbie Reynolds
- Kim Richards
- Michael Rupert
- Telly Savalas as himself
- Dinah Shore as herself
- Sonny Shroyer as Enos Strate from The Dukes of Hazzard
- Jerry Stiller
- Jim Varney
- George Wendt
- Adam West as Mr. Turner, Tommy's sex education teacher

== Production information ==
The show's theme was called "There's a New Girl in Town", performed by Linda Lavin with music by David Shire and lyrics by Alan and Marilyn Bergman. Several arrangements of this tune were used throughout the series' run, including ones that were used only for a few episodes. The lyrics were altered after the second season.

In the opening credits Alice and Tommy pass under overhead road signs that say "Phoenix" and "El Paso". The only location this occurs in this configuration is at the northern end of Interstate 19 in Tucson.

The Mel's Diner set made changes over the years; in the pilot the diner contained a blue refrigerator, but in the series the refrigerator was a dirty stainless steel, then later was changed to clean and shiny stainless steel in 1979–81 and much later the set featured an even shinier stainless steel refrigerator and better appliances. The rest of the set, however, remained the same.

The men's and ladies' restrooms were confined to one room in the pilot and during the first season. From 1977 to 1985, there were separate restrooms with "Ladies" and "Men" written on them.

The storeroom was inside the diner where the men's restroom would later be and said "Private" on it during the 1976–77 season. The storeroom from 1977 to 1985 was confined to the back of the diner. Here, the waitresses took their breaks, had their lockers, and stored their uniforms. Mel also conducted his business from this space.

The payphone was a touch tone and was located on the left of the "Restrooms" door in the pilot episode. For the first season, it was moved to the right of the doors that led to the kitchen section of the diner. For the second season, it was moved to the wall between the two doors that became two separate restrooms and was replaced by a phone with a rotary dial. From 1978 to 1985, the phone was a touch tone and was located at a section that was a few steps away from the entrance to the diner.

In the first season, the diner was decorated in an Aztec and cowboy motif to accommodate the feel of Arizona. For the second season, the walls had pink wallpaper with red lines on it. For the third season, the walls had wallpaper with orange leaves on it.

The giant "14-ounce coffee cup" sign used in later seasons was seen by a producer scouting Phoenix for an establishing shot for the show's later seasons. It was at "Chris' Diner" and the owner agreed to change the name to Mel's for the show.

The cash register was a Sweda Model 46 and was fully functional for the first few seasons. Later in the series it no longer worked and was shown with the "0" in the cents position off-center due to the register being locked up.

Alice's apartment remained more or less unchanged during most of the show's run; the apartments of Mel and Vera and Flo's trailer were occasionally seen. (The set for Flo's trailer was also used on the spinoff Flo.)

The pilot episode was taped at CBS Television City in Hollywood, California. After this, the series was taped at The Warner Bros. Studios in Burbank, California.

Arthur Marx, son of Groucho Marx, co-wrote (with writing partner Robert Fisher and others) 39 episodes of the series, from season two through season six.

=== Mel's Diner ===
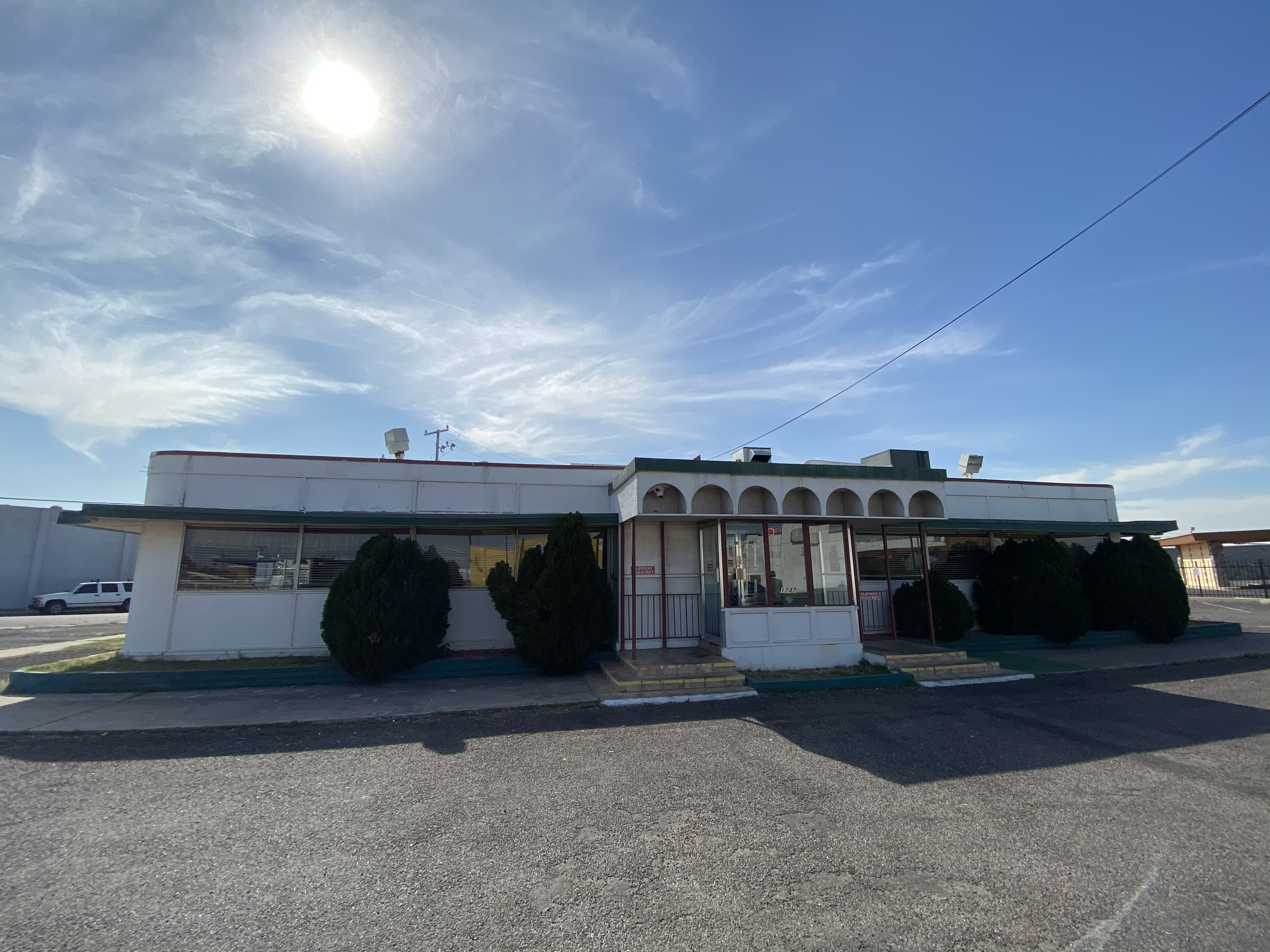
Mel's Diner in Phoenix, Arizona

Mel's Diner is the setting for the show. It is a fictional roadside diner on the outskirts of Phoenix, Arizona, that serves locals and truckers. It has a counter, two large booths and a couple of tables. Most scenes of the show take place in the diner.

Throughout the run of the series, Mel's Diner has a reputation, especially among its regular customers, for serving terrible food, though, more often than not, this is meant to be a joke. Mel's is noted for its gourmet chili, which is referred to as "Mel's Famous Chili". In the episode 'Sharples vs Sharples', Mel's mother, Carrie (Martha Raye), publishes a cookbook with Mel's chili recipe in it and the two fight about whose recipe it really is. Carrie takes it out of the book because Mel claims "it's mine, mine, mine".

The outside shot of the diner's sign with the giant coffee cup sometimes seen in the opening credits of Alice is of a real Mel's Diner (1747 NW Grand Avenue) in Phoenix. The sign was seen by a producer scouting Phoenix for an establishing shot. It had been "Chris' Diner" but the owner agreed to change the name to "Mel's" for the show and is called the same to this day.

In the "Mel Spins His Wheels" episode, Alice informs a customer that the diner's address is 2128 Bush Highway. However, in a subsequent episode ("Big Bad Mel"), the diner's address is given as 1130 Bush Highway. In the "Alice's Blind Date" episode, Alice states over the payphone that the address is 1030 Bush Highway when telling her date where to pick her up.

In Alice Doesn't Live Here Anymore, the movie on which the series Alice is based, the restaurant is called Mel & Ruby's Cafe, located in Tucson, Arizona.

== Differences between the film and television series ==
Alice had many contrasts with the film on which it was based, Alice Doesn't Live Here Anymore. The tone and style of the series differed greatly from the film, and there were a number of factual differences concerning the characters and setting.

Film	Television series
Alice's maiden name was Graham.	Alice's maiden name was Spivak.
Alice and Tommy had previously lived in Socorro, New Mexico.	Alice and Tommy had previously lived in northern New Jersey.
Alice's late husband Donald was portrayed as abusive.	Alice's relationship with Donald is never described, but she kept a photo of him displayed on the wall of her apartment for years after his death.
Alice's original plans were to move back to her hometown of Monterey, California, to restart her singing career.	Alice's original plans were to move to Los Angeles to restart her singing career.
The restaurant where Alice becomes a waitress was called Mel & Ruby's Cafe and located in Tucson.	The restaurant where Alice becomes a waitress is called Mel's Diner and is located in Phoenix. In the pilot episode, the sign on the door says "Mel & Ruby's Cafe".
Alice and Flo do not initially like each other and do not become friends until well into the "Tucson" segment of the film.	Flo takes on the role of "big sister" to the other waitresses, and she and Alice are best friends, unlike the actresses and similar to the film, from the beginning of the series.
Alice ran out of money, and took the job at Mel and Ruby's temporarily to earn enough money to get them the rest of the way to Monterey.	Alice took a job at Mel's because her car broke down when she and Tommy reached Phoenix on the way to Los Angeles.
Mel was a widower, having been married to a woman named Ruby; hence the restaurant's name, "Mel & Ruby's Cafe".	Mel was a middle-aged bachelor.
Alice and Tommy live in a nearby motel while she works at Mel's.	Alice and Tommy move to the Desert Sun Apartments; the distance between her apartment and Mel's Diner is never revealed, but is presumably within walking distance, as it is mentioned that Alice and/or Tommy occasionally walk between the diner and home.
Alice meets and falls in love with a divorced rancher named David, whose wife left him and took their children; David becomes Tommy's guitar teacher.	Alice does not get involved in a serious relationship until the last season.
Alice and Flo were around the same age.	Flo was roughly ten years older than Alice (despite the fact that in reality Holiday and Lavin were approximately the same age, having both been born in 1937).
Flo had blonde hair. She was in a crumbling marriage and her husband was not speaking to her. She had a daughter to support and flirted with and accepted passes from her male customers, but never dated any of them. She had a number of one-liners, including "You can kiss me where the sun don't shine."	Flo had red hair, was divorced three times and had no children. She lived by herself in a trailer park, dated many men, and her usual catchphrases were "Kiss my grits!" and "When donkeys fly!"
Vera had a low, quiet voice; she was taken to and from work by her father; she was shy and somewhat awkward, but was not dumb.	Vera had a high voice that was fairly loud; she lived alone in an apartment that was located at an unknown distance from the diner; she was clumsy, naive, and slow-witted.

== Episodes ==
Season	Episodes	Originally released		Rank	Rating
Season	Episodes	First released	Last released	Rank	Rating
1	24	August 31, 1976	March 26, 1977	30	20.0
2	24	October 2, 1977	April 9, 1978	8	23.2 (Note: Tied with M*A*S*H)
3	24	September 24, 1978	April 1, 1979	13	23.2
4	24	September 23, 1979	April 6, 1980	4	25.3
5	20	November 2, 1980	May 3, 1981	7	22.9
6	24	October 4, 1981	May 16, 1982	5	22.7
7	23	October 6, 1982	September 18, 1983	41	—N/a
8	23	October 2, 1983	May 20, 1984	25	17.2 (Note: Tied with The CBS Tuesday Night Movie, Webster, Knight Rider and Hardcastle and McCormick)
9	16	October 14, 1984	March 19, 1985	58	12.5

== Home media ==
On June 27, 2006, six episodes of Alice were released on DVD by Warner Bros. Home Video as part of the Warner Bros.' Television Favorites compilation series. The episodes were hand-picked by fans at SitcomsOnline.com, as follows:

- "Alice Gets a Pass", September 29, 1976 – First non-pilot episode.
- "The Odd Couple", February 26, 1977 – When Flo's trailer is stolen, Alice allows Flo to move in with her and finds Flo's habits difficult to handle.
- "Close Encounters of the Worst Kind", January 22, 1978 – Alice's use of psychology causes tension among her coworkers.
- "Block Those Kicks", October 22, 1978 – The waitresses decide to give up their bad habits in order to encourage Mel to give up his gambling habit.
- "Cabin Fever", December 2, 1979 – The waitresses, Mel and his girlfriend unknowingly book the same cabin during the same weekend.
- "Flo's Farewell", February 24, 1980 – Flo leaves Mel's Diner for a hosting job at a restaurant in Texas.

Warner Home Video has released all nine seasons on DVD in Region 1 via their Warner Archive Collection. These manufacture-on-demand (MOD) releases, available through Warner's online store Warner Archives Collection, are sold only in the US. The complete ninth and final season was released on March 12, 2019.

DVD name	Ep. #	Release date
The Complete First Season	23	June 12, 2012
The Complete Second Season	24	October 23, 2012
The Complete Third Season	24	March 19, 2013
The Complete Fourth Season	26	October 22, 2013
The Complete Fifth Season	26	August 1, 2017
The Complete Sixth Season	24	December 5, 2017
The Complete Seventh Season	23	July 10, 2018
The Complete Eighth Season	24	October 23, 2018
The Complete Ninth Season	16	March 12, 2019

== Streaming availability ==
The entire series is available from Apple iTunes Store and Amazon Video for downloading. In addition, a holiday episode from Season 3 is available from Amazon.

== Book ==
A book chronicling the development of the TV series, entitled Alice: Life Behind the Counter in Mel's Greasy Spoon (A Guide to the Feature Film, the TV Series, and More), was published by BearManor Media in September 2019.

== Awards ==
The "Tommy's Lost Weekend" episode, written by Bob Bendetson, Howard Bendetson, and Robert Getchell, based on a story by Arnold Anthony Schmidt, received an Emmy nomination in 1984.
