= Big Al's =

Topless bar in San Francisco, 1960s–2009

Coordinates: 37.7980°N 122.4066°W

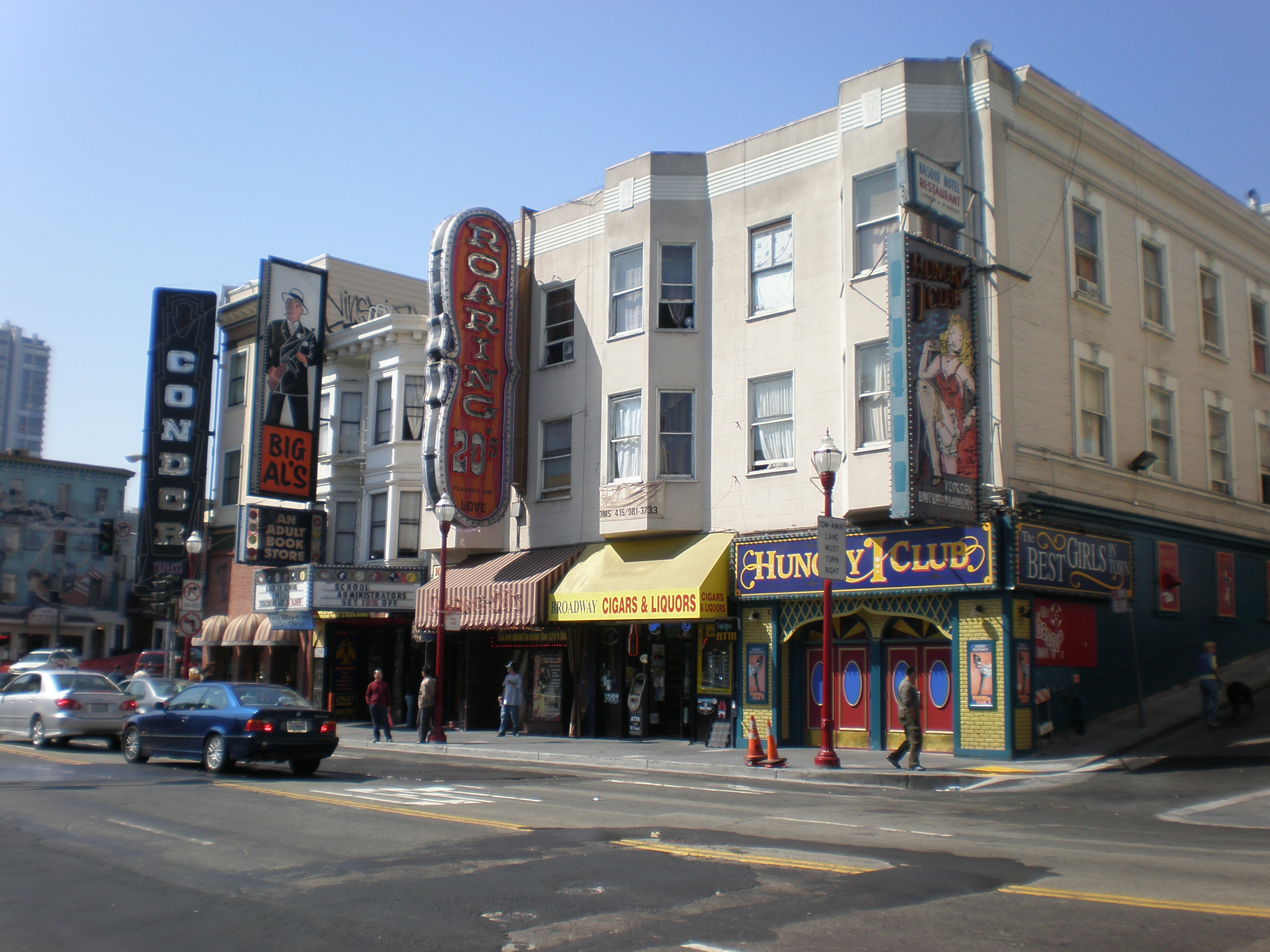
The Condor Club, Big Al's, Roaring 20's, and the Hungry I Club on Broadway

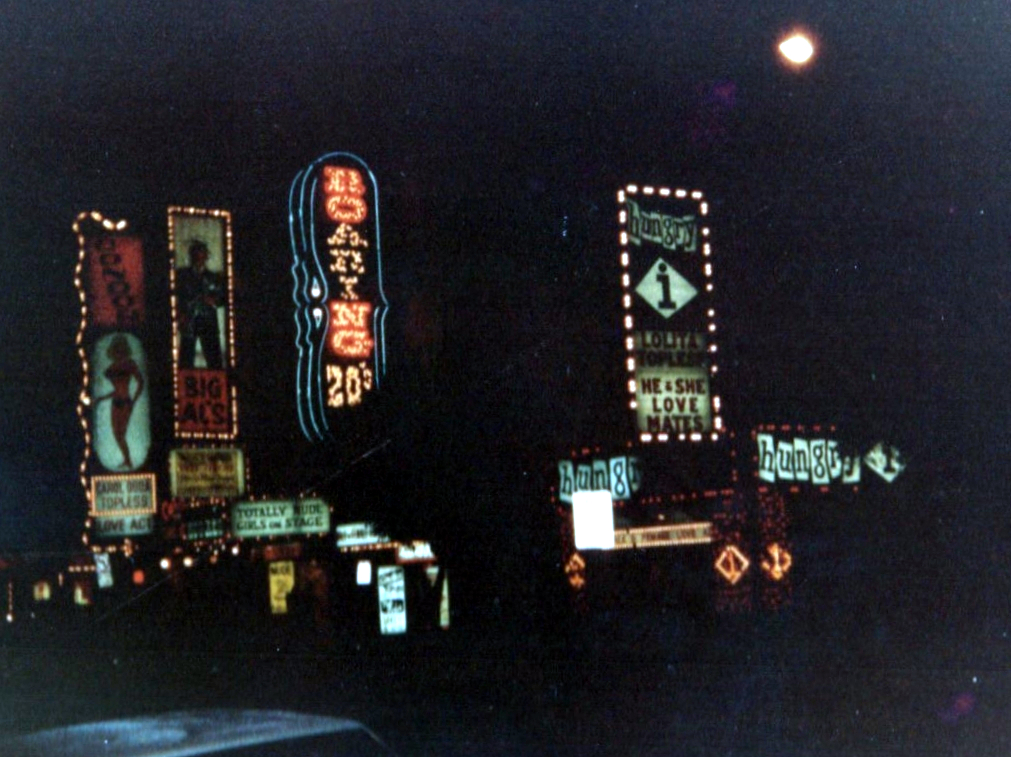
The Condor Club, Big Al's, Roaring 20's, and the Hungry Club lit up at night, September 1983

Big Al's was one of the first topless bars in San Francisco and the United States since the mid-1960s. It was the first full nudity bar in San Francisco. It is next to the Condor Club, where the strip-club phenomenon began, and as of 1991, it claimed to be one of the largest porn stores in San Francisco.

The adult book store closed its doors in 2009. It was later replaced by a sandwich store, and is currently a cigar shop. Both businesses kept the venue's name and iconic neon sign. A San Francisco landmark, the site has been featured in several films and TV shows, on postcards, and in tourist brochures.

== Big Al's in film ==
- Once a Thief - by Ralph Nelson, 1965
- Mondo Topless - by Russ Meyer, 1966
- Dirty Harry - by Don Siegel, 1971

== Similar establishments ==
- Condor Club – a club in North Beach district, San Francisco
- Lusty Lady – a former chain of peep show establishments, with one location in San Francisco's North Beach district, and one in downtown Seattle
- Mitchell Brothers O'Farrell Theatre – A San Francisco striptease club
- Regal Show World – A former adult business in San Francisco

== In Pop Culture ==
- "Eye of The Tiger" music video by the band Survivor was filmed at the location.
- "Roaring 20s", a song by Marcus Orelias was inspired by the Roaring 20s bar next door to Big Al's.
