= The Search for Ancient Rome =

1989 book by Claude Moatti

- First French edition. Detail of The Flavian Amphitheatre (Coliseum), reconstruction. Louis Duc, 1830.
- Author: Claude Moatti
- Original title: À la recherche de la Rome antique
- Translator: Anthony Zielonka
- Cover artist: Joseph-Louis Duc (FR ed.); Jacques Carlu (UK & US eds.)
- Language: French
- Series: Découvertes Gallimard – Archéologie (FR); Abrams Discoveries (US); New Horizons (UK)
- Release number: 56th in collection
- Subject: Archaeology of the city of Rome
- Genre: Nonfiction monograph
- Publisher: FR: Éditions Gallimard; US: Harry N. Abrams; UK: Thames & Hudson
- Publication date: 16 May 1989
- Publication place: France
- English publication date: 1993
- Media type: Print (Paperback)
- Pages: 208 pp.
- ISBN: 978-2-070-53073-1 (first edition)
- OCLC: 717883007
- Preceded by: Cézanne : « Puissant et solitaire »
- Followed by: Les sorcières, fiancées de Satan

The Search for Ancient Rome (French: À la recherche de la Rome antique, lit. 'In Search of Ancient Rome') is a 1989 illustrated monograph on the archaeology and history of the rediscovery of the ancient city of Rome. Written by French historian Claude Moatti, and published by Éditions Gallimard as the 56th volume in the "Découvertes" collection.

Moatti organised a project of research on the history of rediscovery of the ancient city of Rome in the late 1980s, the findings of the project gave birth to this small volume.

== Contents and synopsis ==
From left: UK and US editions.

As part of the Archéologie series, Moatti discusses the remnants of the Roman civilisation, including the Colosseum, the Pantheon, the Baths of Diocletian, and its twenty centuries of pillage. The body text is divided into six chapters: I, "Rome, the Eternal City" (Rome, Ville Éternelle); II, "The Age of the Humanists" (Les Temps des humanistes); III, "From Private Collections to Art History" (Des collections privées à l'histoire de l'art); IV, "Rome Under Napoleon" (La Rome de Napoléon); V, "The Age of Reason" (L'Âge de raison); VI, "From One Myth to Another" (D'un mythe à l'autre).

In the beginning, Moatti emphasises the obscurity of Rome's past, because Rome was "being destroyed and buried time and time again over centuries, its history has been obscured", and "the veil of legend has covered its ruins". During Medieval period, these ruins have exerted a real fascination as shown in the Mirabilia Urbis Romae. In the Renaissance era, while Columbus was exploring the New World, artists, scholars, princes, adventurers and popes were searching through the soil of Rome for the remains of its former splendour. The city was rebuilt and brought back to life. But it was not until the 20th century, thanks to the development of archaeology, the origins of the city were finally revealed. The author also examines to what extent the architectural beauty of Rome has been valued or demolished over the centuries, what the causes are of its decay and what is being done to protect those monuments of the past from total decay.

The second part of this book is the "Documents" section containing a compilation of excerpts divided into six parts (pp. 145–199): 1, The city under threat (La ville menacée); 2, Piranesi, the archaeologist (Piranèse archéologue); 3, The journey to Rome (Le voyage à Rome); 4, Parker the photographer (Parker photographe); 5, Tales of excavations (Histoires de fouilles); 6, Christian archaeology (L'archéologie chrétienne). These are followed by a list of further reading, a list of illustrations and an index. The book also includes research on the Palatine, the Pincian and in the field of Christian archaeology.

== Reception ==
David Watkin called The Search for Ancient Rome "a brilliant little book", which "ends with a chilling hint of the fate some archaeologists might have in mind for Rome: nothing less than its destruction."

Robert Ginsberg also gave the book a positive review: "A handy illustrated volume on the changing attitudes toward the ancient city of Rome, with a valuable section of documentary sources."

An anonymous reviewer of the Belgian weekly magazine De Voorpost opined that "in this book one finds a perfect description of all that greatness [of Rome]. Richly illustrated, with comparisons and reconstructions of buildings. [...] If you take a trip to ancient Rome, this little book will certainly provide you with a good guide to the many sights."
