= The Knight in Rusty Armor =

1989 self-help novel

Book cover

The Knight in Rusty Armor is a novel and self-help book by the American writer and screenwriter Robert Fisher. Published in 1989, the work is characterized by its allegorical style and is loosely based on John Bunyan’s classic The Pilgrim’s Progress. The novel has been translated into numerous languages and has been an international bestseller.

== Plot ==
The story revolves around a heroic medieval knight who wore a beautiful suit of armor that reflected the sun’s rays. Over time, the knight grew accustomed to wearing it constantly, never taking it off—not even to sleep. One day, after his wife’s pleas—since so much time had passed that even his son had forgotten what the knight looked like—he decided to take it off and discovered he could not. Thus began a long journey to find help and rid himself of his armor. On this journey, he would receive help from the wizard Merlin and other characters from European folklore.
