= Sara Raasch =

American author of young adult fiction (born 1989)

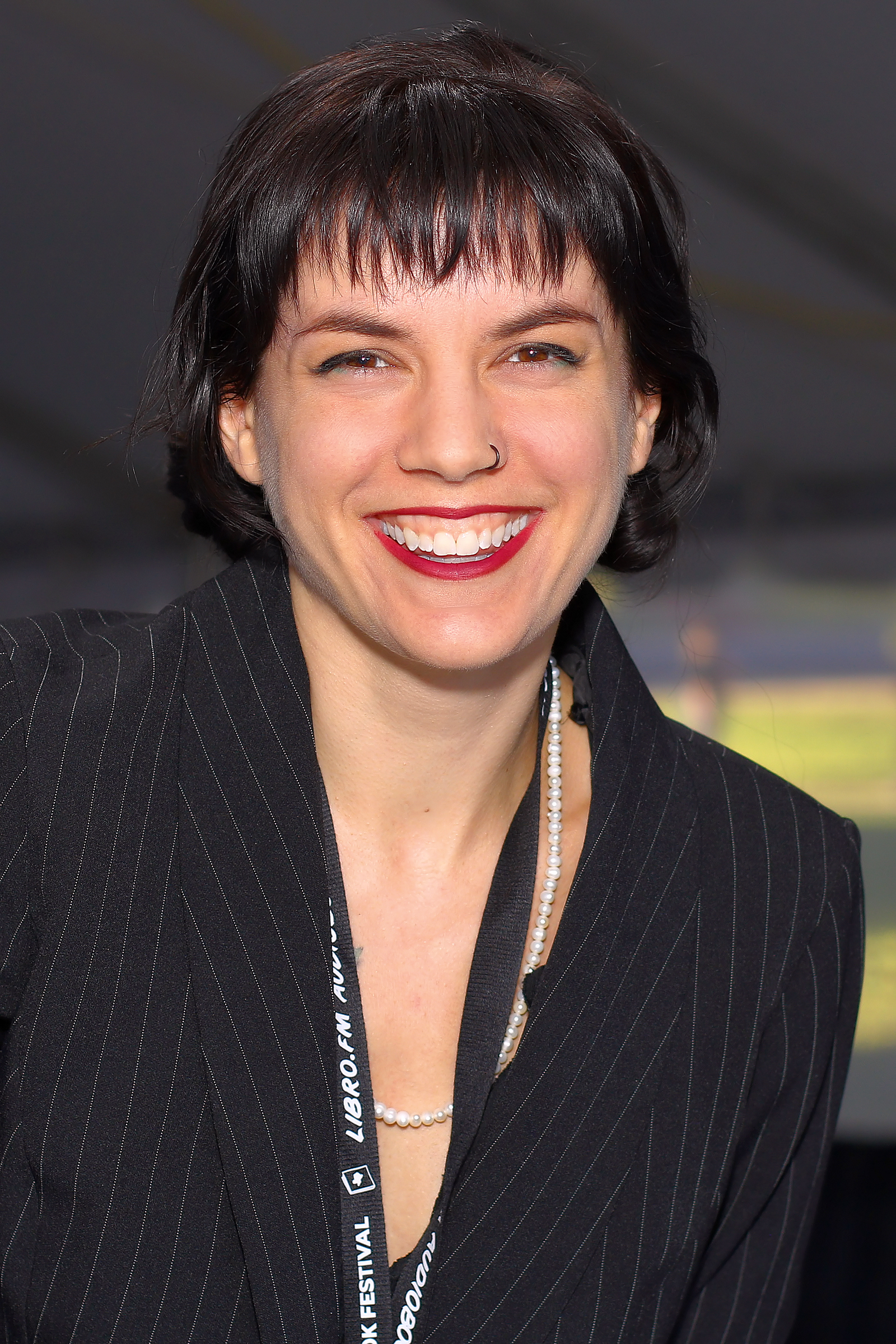
- Raasch at the 2025 Texas Book Festival
- Born: August 26, 1989 (age 37); Ohio
- Education: Wright State University
- Occupation: Writer
- Writing career
- Genres: Young adult fiction, fantasy
- Website: https://www.sararaaschbooks.com

Sara Raasch (born August 26, 1989) is an American author of young adult fiction. She wrote the fantasy New York Times Bestselling trilogy Snow Like Ashes (Balzer + Bray/HarperCollins) as well as the fantasy series These Rebel Waves and the sequel, These Divided Shores (Balzer + Bray/HarperCollins).

== Biography ==
Raised in Ohio, Raasch graduated from Wright State University with a degree in Organizational Leadership and currently resides in Ohio.

== Young Adult Series ==
Snow Like Ashes series (Balzer + Bray/HarperCollins)

- Snow Like Ashes (2014)
- Ice Like Fire (2015)
- Frost Like Night (2016)
- These Rebel Waves (2019)
- These Divided Shores (2019)
- Set Fire to the Gods (co-author) (2020)

These Rebel Waves and its sequel, These Divided Shores were "inspired by the Spanish Inquisition and the Golden Age of Piracy".

== Adult Series ==
Royals and Romance series (Bramble)

- The Nightmare Before Kissmas (2024)
- Go Luck Yourself (2025)

Magic & Romance series (Bramble)

- The Entanglement of Rival Wizards (2025)
- The Fake Divination Offense (2026)

Heroes and Romance series (Bramble)

- Lightning & Thunder (2026)
- Sun & Scythe (2027)

Reception

Snow Like Ashes (2014) became a New York Times Bestseller in 2015. Shortly after, Ice Like Fire (2015) debuted on the New York Times list at #3. Raasch's books have been Colorado Blue Spruce Award nominees, an RT Book Reviews Top Pick, a Huffington Post Best Overall YA Book of 2014, and a Hypable Top Ten Books of 2014.
