= Claudia Moatti =

French historian (born 1954)

- Born: 19 February 1954 (age 72); Miliana, French Algeria
- Education: École normale supérieure de Sèvres
- Occupation: Historian specialised in Roman studies
- Employer(s): University of Paris VIII; University of Southern California
- Notable work: The Search for Ancient Rome; Res publica : Histoire romaine de la chose publique

Claudia Moatti (also known as Claude Moatti; born 19 February 1954) is a French historian specialised in Roman studies. She is currently professor of Roman history at University of Paris VIII, and adjunct professor of Classics and Law at the University of Southern California (USC).

== Career ==
Moatti studied classics at the École normale supérieure de Sèvres in France, where she specialised in political thought and the crisis in culture that arose at the end of the Roman Republic and in the early Roman Empire, a period around the 2nd century BC to 1st century AD.

She earned her PhD in History at the Paris-Sorbonne University, and taught at the University of Paris. She is also a former member of the staff of the French Academy in Rome. She has done research on the history of the discovery of ancient Rome and the "invention" of Roman archaeology in the late 1980s. The first findings of this project is presented in her book À la recherche de la Rome antique.

Moatti has been a full professor at USC since 2004. She has published a number of books and articles. She is interested in the construction of the concept of Res publica, her book on this subject—Res publica : Histoire romaine de la chose publique—has been published in April 2018, by Fayard. She is currently working on four books.

== Selected publications ==
- With Odile Bombarde, Living in Ancient Rome, Young Discovery Library, 1988
- À la recherche de la Rome antique, coll. « Découvertes Gallimard » (nº 56), série Archéologie. Éditions Gallimard, 1989
  - US edition – The Search for Ancient Rome, "Abrams Discoveries" series. Harry N. Abrams, 1993
  - UK edition – The Search for Ancient Rome, 'New Horizons' series. Thames & Hudson, 1993 (reprinted in 2001)
- The Birth of Critical Thinking in Republican Rome, Cambridge University Press, 2015
- Res publica : Histoire romaine de la chose publique, Librairie Arthème Fayard, 2018
