= Big Al (play) =

Play by Bryan Goluboff

- Original language: English
- Written by: Bryan Goluboff
- Characters: Leo; Ricky; Frank Rose Jr.
- Setting: New York City

Premiere
- Date: One Act (1996); Full play (2002)
- Place: United States

Big Al is an Off-Broadway play by Bryan Goluboff that went up at the Arclight Theatre. It was originally a 1991 play that premiered at the Ensemble Studio Theatre's marathon, then 1992 at the American Jewish Theatre, and in 1993 it was a 24-minute film on Showtime. It then was a one-act play that premiered at Man In The Moon Theatre in London in 1996.

== Plot ==
Scene One follows bipolar Leo, who is an obsessed fan of Al Pacino. His more mature friend Ricky and him are wannabe screenwriters. It also has them cooking up an elaborate plot that will appeal to Al. Leo obsession turns to insanity. Scene Two is several years later and Leo was released from the mental institution. It shows how the two friends' lives have taken turns, not necessarily unpredictable, but turns nonetheless. Scene Three is where Frank Rose Jr. enters, and is a nightmarish mirror of Leo's fantasy life. He is Mr. Pacino's bodyguard. Scene Four is the redemption, where friends and friends, and the optimism leaves you with the feeling something good is about to happen.

== Productions ==
The 1991 production was in the Ensemble Studio Theatre's marathon. The artistic director was Curt Dempster, directed by Peter Maloney, set designed by Ann Waugh, costume design by Patricia Sarnutaro, lighting design by Greg MacPherson, and sound design was by One Dream. The cast featured Evan Handler as Leo and Gus Rogerson as Ricky.

The 1992 production was at the American Jewish Theatre. The artistic director was Stanley Brechner, directed by Peter Maloney, set designed by James Wolk, lighting design by Howard Werner, and sound design by Bruce Ellman. The cast featured Evan Handler as Leo and Gus Rogerson as Ricky.

The 2002 Off-Broadway at Arclight Theatre was directed by Evan Bergman and produced by Laine Valentino, set design by John Farrell, costume design by Markas Henry, lighting design by Chard McArver, production manager was Sara Jane Fleming, stage manager was Jim Ring, and sound design by Cynthia Tuohy. The cast featured Juan Carlos Hernandez as Leo, Jordan Bridges as Ricky, and David Thornton as Frank Rose Jr.
