= Big Al Brewing =

Brewery in White Center, Washington, US

Coordinates: 47.51432°N 122.35265°W

- Industry: Alcoholic beverage
- Founded: 2008
- Defunct: 2018
- Products: Beer

Big Al Brewing was a brewery in White Center, Washington, United States. It was started in August 2008 by Alejandro Brown with a Belgian-style wheat beer and an Irish red ale. The brewery is located in Pacific Rim Brewing's former facility. It features a tasting room and lounge.

As of 2009, the beer was available at over 70 bars and restaurants in the Puget Sound region. Since Brown began brewing at home himself, Big Al Brewing has produced beers from the winners of contests in an effort to promote home brewing. The brewery has also partnered with the Emerald City Supporters to release a beer for fans of Seattle Sounders FC. The brewery closed down in 2018.

== See also ==
- Beer in the United States
