= Natalie Kusz =

American memoirist

- Born: 1962 (age 63–64)
- Education: University of Alaska Fairbanks
- Occupation: Memoirist

Natalie Kusz (born 1962) is an American memoirist.

== Life ==
She graduated from University of Alaska Fairbanks with a B.A. and an M.F.A. She taught at Bethel College, and Harvard University. She teaches at Eastern Washington University. Her work appeared in O, Harper's, Threepenny Review, McCall's, Real Simple, and The New York Times.

== Awards ==
- 1989 Whiting Award
- 1999-2000 Radcliffe College's Bunting Institute fellowship
- 1995 National Endowment for the Arts fellowship

== Works ==
- Road Song. Farrar, Straus and Giroux. 1990. ISBN 978-0-374-52827-0.

=== Anthologies ===
- Donna Jarrell; Ira Sukrungruang, eds. (2005). "On Being Invisible". Scoot Over, Skinny: The Fat Nonfiction Anthology. Houghton Mifflin Harcourt. p. 20. ISBN 978-0-15-603022-9.
- Ian Frazier; Robert Atwan, eds. (1997). The Best American essays. Ticknor & Fields. ISBN 978-0-395-85695-6.
- Amy Hempel; Jim Shepard, eds. (1999). "Retired Greyhound II". Unleashed: Poems by Writers' Dogs. Random House, Inc. ISBN 978-0-609-80379-0.
- Frederick Smock, ed. (1998). "Persistent Heat". The American voice anthology of poetry. University Press of Kentucky. p. 62. ISBN 978-0-8131-0956-5.
- Bill Henderson, ed. (1990). The Pushcart prize, XV: best of the small presses. Pushcart Press. ISBN 978-0-916366-65-0.
