= Frost & Fire =

- Dust jacket from the first edition
- Author: Roger Zelazny
- Cover artist: Linda Burr
- Language: English
- Genre: Science fiction and Fantasy short stories, essays
- Publisher: William Morrow
- Publication date: 1989
- Publication place: United States
- Media type: Print (hardback)
- Pages: 288 pp
- ISBN: 0-688-08942-9
- OCLC: 19267568
- Dewey Decimal: 813/.54 19
- LC Class: PS3576.E43 F7 1989

Frost & Fire is a 288-page collection of short stories and essays by Roger Zelazny. It was published in 1989 by William Morrow.

== Contents ==
- "An Exorcism, of Sorts"
- "Permafrost"
- "LOKI 7281"
- "Dreadsong"
- "Itself Surprised" - a story set in the Berserker shared universe.
- "Dayblood"
- "Constructing A Science Fiction Novel"
- "The Bands of Titan"
- "Mana from Heaven" - a story set in Larry Niven's Warlock universe, updated to modern times.
- "Night Kings", first published in Worlds of If magazine, September–November 1986
- "Quest's End"
- "24 Views of Mt. Fuji, by Hokusai"
- "Fantasy and Science Fiction: A Writer's View"
