= Robert Fisher (playwright) =

American dramatist (1922–2008)

Robert "Bob" Fisher
- Born: Robert H. Fisher; September 21, 1922; California, United States
- Died: September 19, 2008 (aged 85); Topanga, California, United States
- Occupations: Playwright. TV and film screenwriter
- Years active: 1952-1986

Robert "Bob" Fisher (September 21, 1922 – September 19, 2008) was an American playwright, and television and film screenwriter mostly of situational comedy.

== Biography ==
One of the most prolific of sitcom writers, Fisher began in television the 1950s by pairing up with a veteran radio writer twenty-five years his senior named Alan Lipscott. Lipscott and Fisher wrote the first episode of the CBS-TV sitcom series Make Room For Daddy (starring Danny Thomas) in 1953, and went on to craft teleplays for The Donna Reed Show, Bachelor Father (which starred John Forsythe), Bronco, How to Marry a Millionaire, and others. Following Lipscott's death in 1961, Fisher then began writing with Arthur Marx, and that partnership (which lasted for over twenty-five years) produced episodes of McHale's Navy, My Three Sons, The Mothers-in-Law, the short lived ABC-TV series The Paul Lynde Show, and NBC-TV's Life With Lucy in 1986. He and Marx were also story editors and frequent writers on CBS-TV's Alice from 1977–1981.

Fisher also wrote occasionally with Arthur Alsberg (on I Dream of Jeannie and Mona McCluskey) and had three plays produced on Broadway: the hit The Impossible Years (with Marx), Minnie's Boys (with Marx), and Happiness Is Just a Little Thing Called a Rolls Royce (with Alsberg), which closed after one performance.

Fisher is also the author of the book The Knight in Rusty Armor, which is a tale of man's journey to discover himself through a series of both comedic and tragic transformations.

== Death ==
Fisher died in 2008 in Topanga, California, just two days before his 86th birthday, although other sources given the date of death as 26 September.

== Works as screenwriter ==
His many works as a television writer included:

=== Partial filmography ===
Screenwriter work
Year	Title	Job	Notes
1986	Life with Lucy (TV series)	Writer	3 episodes
1982	There Was a Little Girl	Writer	Feature film
1977-1981	Alice (TV series)	Writer (Story)	40 episodes
1975	Good Times	Story/Teleplay	1 episode ("The Dinner Party")
1975	Maude	Writer	1 episode ("Walter's Ethics")
1975	The Jeffersons	Writer	1 episode ("Jefferson vs. Jefferson")
1972-1973	The Paul Lynde Show	Writer	9 episodes
1972	All in the Family	Writer	1 episode ("The Locket")
1969	The Good Guys	Writer	1 episode ("The Eyes Have It")
1968-1969	The Mothers-In-Law (TV series)	Writer	4 episodes
1965	I Dream of Jeannie	Writer	3 episodes
1963-1971	My Three Sons	Writer	2 episodes
1961	Leave It to Beaver	Story	1 episode ("Teacher's Daughter")
1959-1962	Bachelor Father	Writer/Teleplay	30 episodes
1958-1959	The Donna Reed Show	Writer/Teleplay	5 episodes total
1958-1959	Bronco	Writer	2 episodes
1958	How to Marry a Millionaire	Writer	2 episodes
1953-1963	Make Room For Daddy	Writer/Teleplay	Involved with 18 total episodes

Fisher also produced television episodes for:

- McHale’s Navy
- My Three Sons
- The Mothers-in-Law
- The Paul Lynde Show
- Life With Lucy
- Cheyenne

His plays included:

- Happiness Is Just a Little Thing Called a Rolls Royce (1968)
- The Impossible Years (1968)
- Minnie's Boys (1970)
- Groucho: A Life in Revue (1987)

In his last few years he was said to lead a "a peripatetic lifestyle".
