= Big Al (book) =

1989 picture book by Andrew Clements

- Author: Andrew Clements
- Cover artist: Yoshi Kogo
- Language: English
- Series: Big Al
- Subject: Friendship
- Genre: children's books picture books
- Publisher: Picture Book Studio; Simon & Schuster
- Publication date: 1989
- Publication place: United States
- Pages: 32
- ISBN: 978-0-689-81722-9
- OCLC: 37778110
- Preceded by: N/A
- Followed by: Big Al and Shrimpy

Big Al is an American children's picture book written by Andrew Clements and illustrated by Yoshi Kogo. It was originally released in 1989 through Picture Book Studio, later rereleased via Simon & Schuster. A sequel, Big Al and Shrimpy, was released in 2002. The book is about a fish named Al who wants to have friends, but all the fish are afraid of him.
