= Giampaolo Rugarli =

Italian novelist

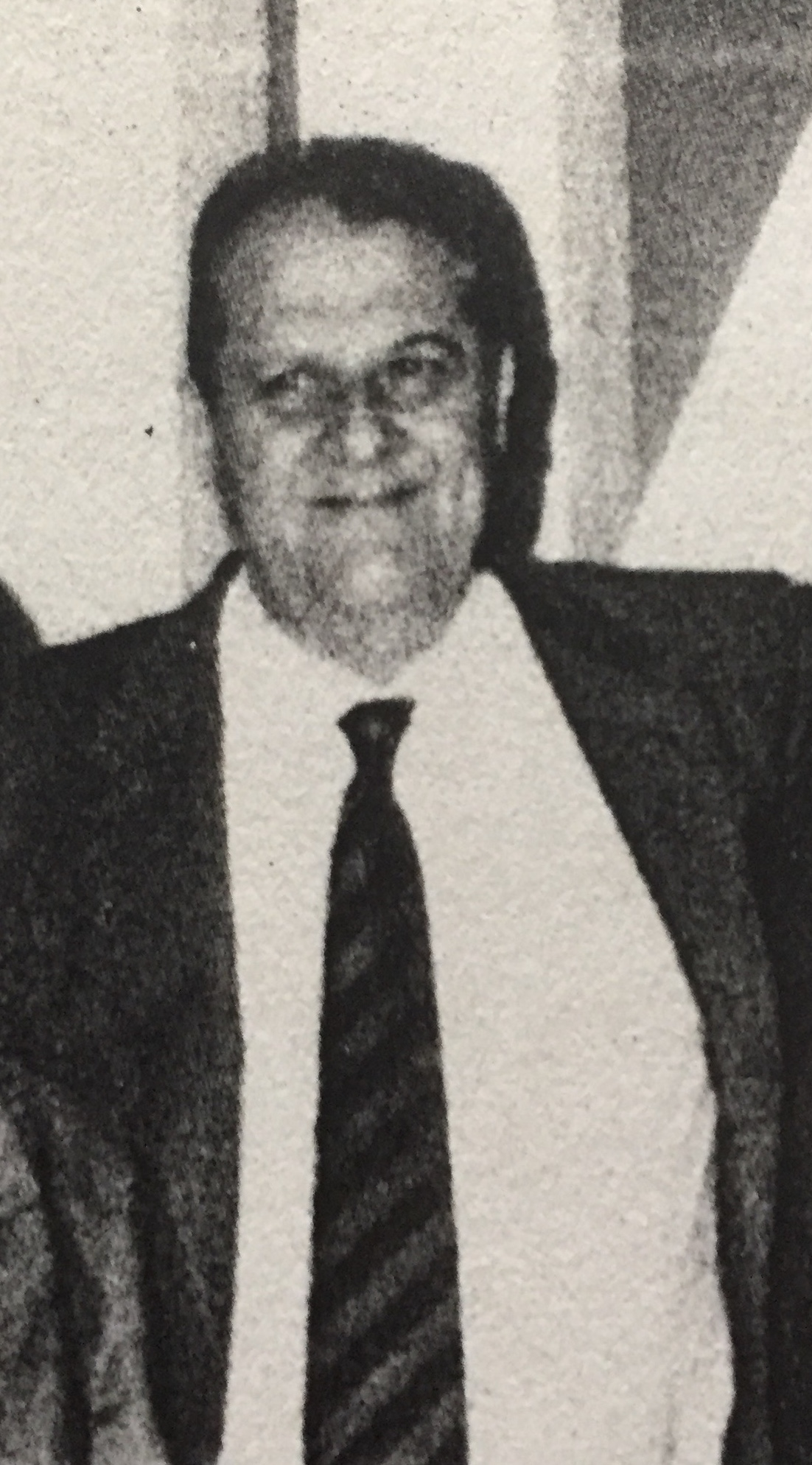
- Born: 5 December 1932; Naples, Italy
- Died: 2 December 2014 (aged 81); Olevano Romano, Italy
- Occupation: novelist

Giampaolo Rugarli (5 December 1932 – 2 December 2014) was an Italian novelist.

Born in Naples, after graduating in law Rugarli worked from 1955 for the bank institute Cariplo, becoming director of the Roman office of the institute in 1972. Later he was appointed head of the "Studies Office" of Cariplo, and he founded with the publisher Laterza, and directed, the journal Rivista Milanese di Economia ("Milan Journal of Economics"). At the end of 1985 he left his job at the bank and began to devote himself exclusively to his work as a writer.

Rugarli published more than 20 works, translated into several languages. His 1989 novel Il nido di ghiaccio won the Premio Selezione Campiello, while his 1991 novel Andromeda e la notte was finalist at the Strega Prize. He also collaborated with Corriere della Sera and with other Italian newspapers. His last novel Manuale di solitudine was published posthumously in March 2015.
