= South Hill Park, London =

Street in London

Coordinates: 51.5577°N 0.1632°W

South Hill Park
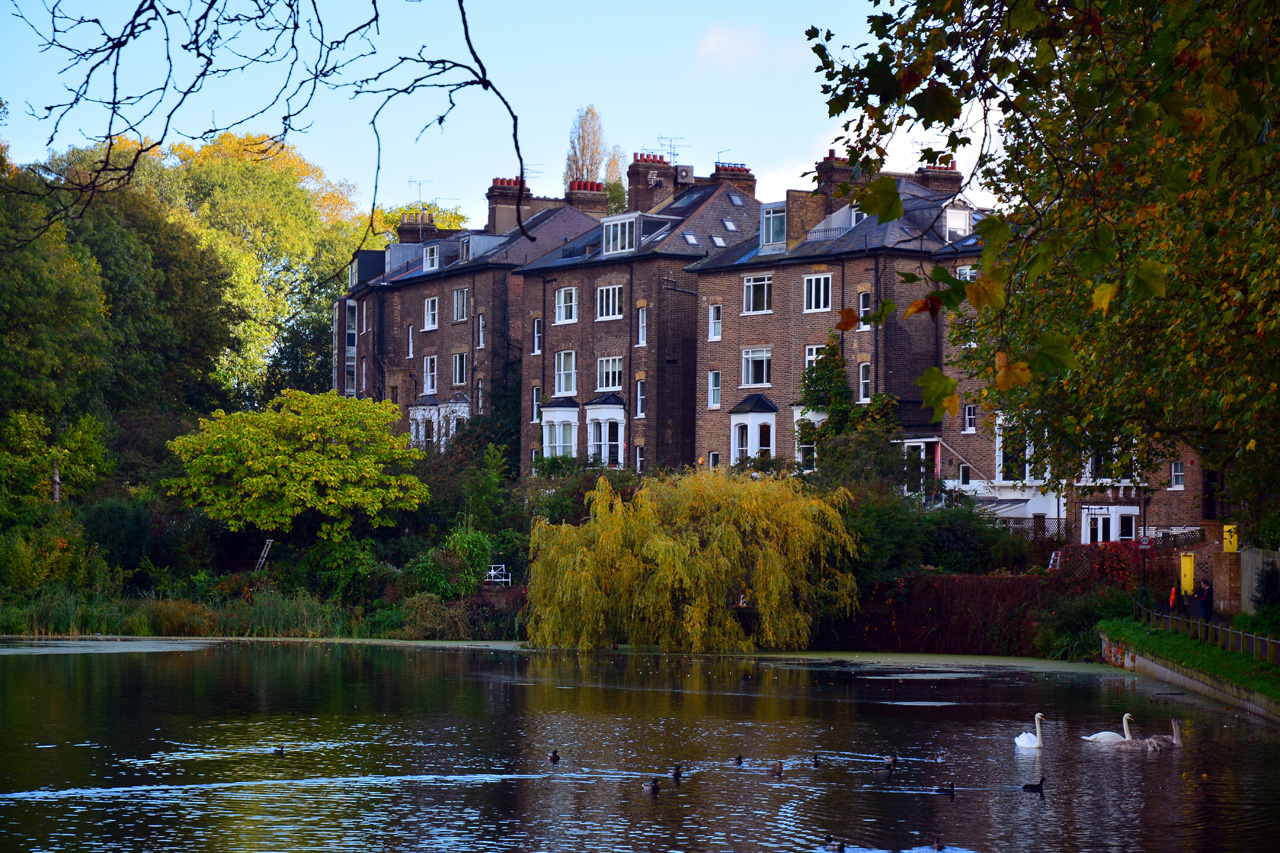
- Houses on South Park Hill, overlooking the Hampstead Heath Ponds
- Location: Hampstead, Camden, London
- Nearest metro station: Hampstead Heath railway station

South Hill Park is a street in the Hampstead district of London. It is within the London Borough of Camden, and some of its houses overlook Hampstead Heath.

== Transport links ==
Hampstead Heath railway station, on the North London Line, is at the southern end of South Hill Park. Buses, chiefly the number 24, depart from nearby South End Green.

== Ruth Ellis ==
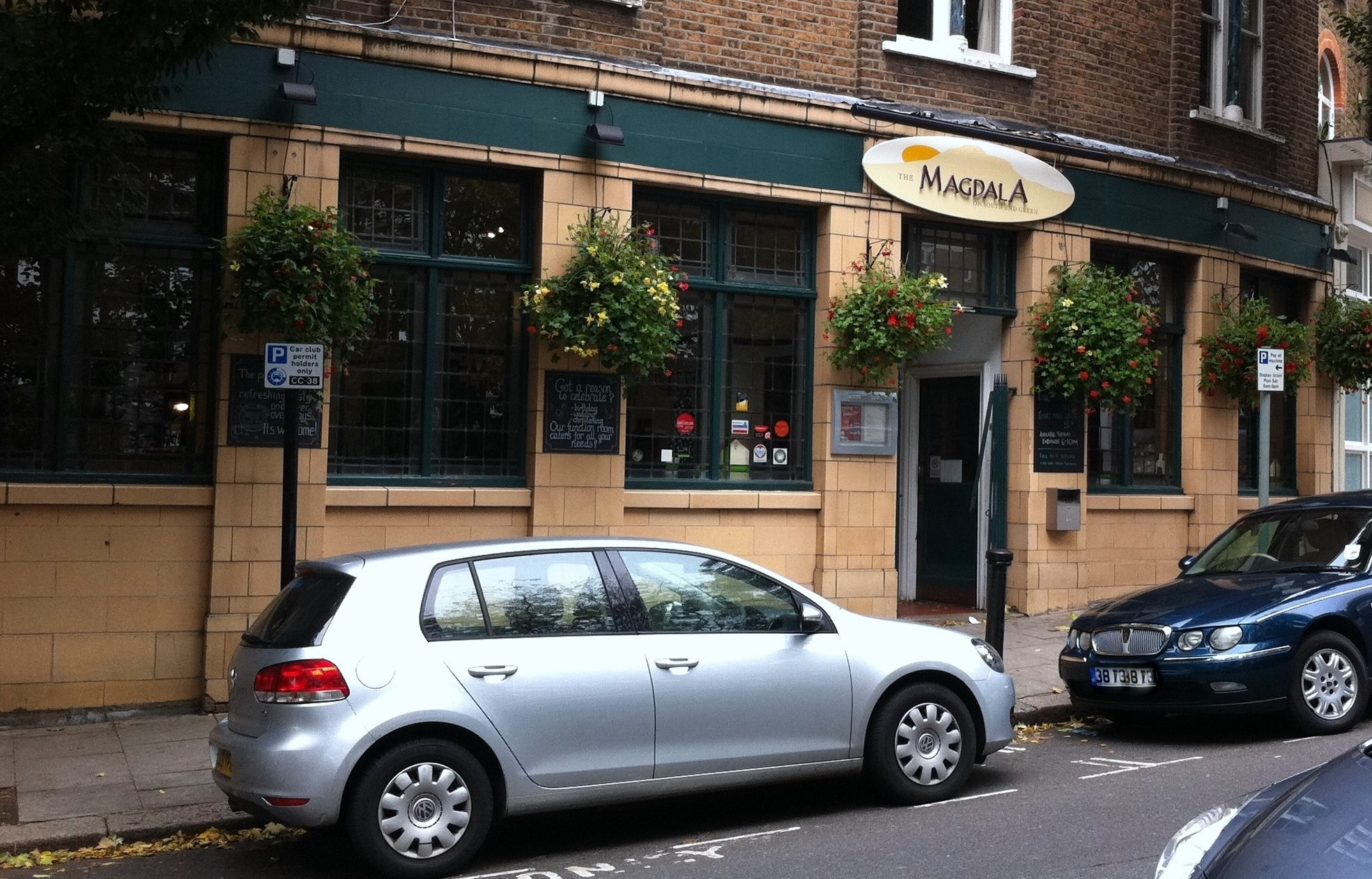
The Magdala in 2010

The last woman to be hanged in Britain, Ruth Ellis, was sentenced to death for a murder committed on South Hill Park. She shot her boyfriend David Blakely outside a public house, The Magdala, on 10 April 1955.

== Styllou Christofi ==
The penultimate woman to be hanged in Britain, Styllou Christofi, was sentenced to death for murdering her daughter-in-law at 11 South Hill Park, on 29 July 1954.

== In popular culture ==
The opening shots of 1965 film Licensed to Kill (a low-budget pastiche of James Bond films) are filmed at the southern end of the street near the entrance to Hampstead Heath opposite the station.

== Notable residents ==
- The Australian Prime Minister Andrew Fisher spent his retirement and last years in South Hill Park, 1922–28.
- The film director Anthony Minghella lived in South Hill Park until his death in 2008. His son, Max Minghella, had a role in the film Hippie Hippie Shake, parts of which were shot in the street and its surrounding area.
- Jonathan Ross and his family lived on South Hill Park in the 1990s.
- The poet Adrian Mitchell lived in South Hill Park until his death in 2008.
- David Baddiel
- Frank Skinner
- Bill Oddie, ornithologist and comedian, lived in South Hill Park in the 70s and 80s
- Terrance Dicks, author and scriptwriter for Doctor Who, has lived in South Hill Park since the 60s
- Terry Gilliam, comedian, artist and film director, lived in South Hill Park in the 70s and 80s
- John Williams, classical guitarist, lived in South Hill Park in the 1970s and 80s
