= List of assets of community value =

This is a partial and incomplete list of assets of community value registered under the Localism Act 2011 by local authorities in England. Owners of these properties must inform the local authority if they wish to sell the asset and should a community organisation wish to purchase it a moratorium period of six months is triggered to allow them the opportunity to raise sufficient money.

== Cambridgeshire ==
Five local authorities maintain of assets of community value in Cambridgeshire; Cambridge City Council, South Cambridgeshire District Council, East Cambridgeshire District Council, Fenland District Council and Huntingdonshire District Council.

=== Pubs ===
- Straw Bear, Whittlesey
- The Anchor, Wimblington

=== Other facilities ===
- Estover Road Playing Fields, March

== Cheshire ==
Four local authorities maintain of assets of community value in Cheshire; Cheshire East Council, Cheshire West and Chester Council, Halton Borough Council and Warrington Borough Council

=== Pubs ===
- The Golden Lion, Ashton Hayes
- The Albion Inn, Chester
- Bird in Hand, Guilden Sutton
- Stags Head Hotel, Great Warford
- The Wellington, Hale, Halton
- Railway Inn, Helsby
- The Red Lion, Malpas
- Old Ship Inn, Macclesfield
- The Robin Hood Inn, Rainow
- Sandpiper Inn, Sandbach
- The Greyhound, Saughall
- The Vine Inn, Shavington
- Ring o Bells, Stretton
- The Centurian, Vicars Cross
- Unicorn Inn, Wilmslow
- The Royal Oak, Worleston
- The Raven Inn, Culcheth

=== Other facilities ===
- Women's Institute Hall, Ashton Hayes
- Community Social Club, Barrow
- Burton Manor, Burton
- Community Greenhouse, Chelford
- Vale Allotments, Congleton
- Ford Lane Allotments, Crewe
- Hulme Street Allotments, Crewe
- The Halfway House, Childer Thornton
- Farndon Sports and Social Club, Farndon
- Scout Hut, Great Sankey
- The Riverside Centre, Handbridge
- Hankelow Methodist Church, Hankelow
- Village Hall, Hartford
- Thorn Wood, Hartford
- Land at Sherwood Court, Helsby
- AP Sports and Social Club, Holmes Chapel
- Village Hall, Mickle Trafford
- Village Hall Car Park, Mickle Trafford
- Land at Oakmere Way/Stoneyford Lane, Oakmere
- Land adjacent to Oakmere Way, Oakmere
- Longbarn Bowling Green, Poulton-with-Fearnhead
- Land on Park House Lane, Prestbury
- Conkers Play Centre, Saughall
- Royal British Legion Allotments, Tarporley
- Royal British Legion Bowling Green, Tarporley
- Tilston Village Stores, Tilston
- Gorsty Hill Golf Club, Weston
- Former Bingo Hall/Drill Hall, Winsford

== London ==
=== Pubs ===
- The Ivy House, pub, Southwark London Borough Council
- The Old White Bear, (Public House dating back to 1704), Well Road, Hampstead village, London NW3 1LJ.
- The Sir Richard Steele, Haverstock Hill, Hampstead, London NW3 4RL.
- The Wheatsheaf Upper Tooting Road, London SW17.
- The Trafalgar Arms, Upper Tooting Rd, London SW17.
- The Truscott Arms Maida Vale, London NW8.
- The Chesham Arms, Mehetabel Rd, Hackney, London E8.
- The Lord Rookwood, Cann Hall Rd, London E11.
- The Antwerp Arms, Tottenham, London N10.
- The Landseer Arms, Upper Holloway London N19.
- The Magdala pub in Hampstead, London NW3.

=== Other facilities ===
- Gala Bingo Club, formerly Granada Tooting cinema
- Former Embassy Cinema, currently known as Mayfair Venue, Chadwell Heath
- Heaven nightclub, Westminster
- Prince Charles Cinema, an independent repertory cinema in Westminster

== Sussex ==
=== Pubs ===
The following pubs in Sussex (including some which have closed down and been converted to other uses) were registered as ACVs as of 1 October 2015:

- Abergavenny Arms, Rodmell
- Anchor Inn, Ringmer
- Black Horse, Amberley
- Cross Inn, Cripps Corner
- Dorset Arms, Withyham
- Dinkum, Polegate
- The Drive, Eastbourne
- Eight Bells, Bolney
- Foresters Arms, Kirdford
- Fox Inn, Felpham
- George Inn, Felpham
- Half Moon, Kirdford
- Half Moon, Northchapel
- Highlands Inn, Ridgewood
- Horse and Groom, Hanover, Brighton
- Hurst Arms, Willingdon
- Inn on the Green, Scaynes Hill
- Jolly Tanners, Staplefield
- Jolly Sportsman, East Chiltington
- Joyful Whippet, Sompting
- The Junction, Polegate
- Keepers Arms, Trotton
- Kings Beach Hotel, Pagham
- Lamb Inn, Ripe
- Lickfold Inn, Lickfold
- Mill Tavern, between Camelsdale and Shottermill
- Muddy Duck, Northiam
- Murrell Arms, Barnham
- New Inn, Littlehampton
- New Inn, Winchelsea
- Old Barn, Felpham
- The Parkfield, Hampden Park, Eastbourne
- Plough Inn, Crowhurst
- Prince Albert, Copthorne
- Prince of Wales, Heathfield
- Red Lion, Hooe
- Red Lyon, Slinfold
- Roebuck Inn, Laughton
- Rose & Crown, Fletching
- Rose Hill Tavern, Round Hill, Brighton
- Royal Oak, Crawley Down
- Royal Oak, East Wittering
- Royal Oak, North Bersted
- Seaview Hotel, East Preston
- Ship Inn, Aldwick
- Southdowns, Felpham
- Star and Garter, East Dean
- Thatched House, Felpham
- Tudor Tavern, East Preston
- Victory Inn, Staplefield
- Vine Inn, Tarring
- The Watermill, Burgess Hill
- White Horse, Graffham
- White Horse, Lindfield
- Wilkes Head, Eastergate

The following current and former pubs in the city of Brighton and Hove have also been listed as ACVs:

- The Downsman, Hangleton
- The Cuthbert, Queen's Park
- The Independent (formerly the Walmer Castle), Queen's Park
- The West Hill, West Hill
- The Lectern, Lewes Road
- The King and Queen, central Brighton

Also registered as an asset of community value is the green and playground in the suburb of Westdene.

== Sources ==
- Cheshire East Borough Council
- Cheshire West and Chester Borough Council
- Fenland District
- Halton Borough Council
- Huntingdonshire District Council
- Lambeth London Borough Council
- Southwark London Borough Council
- Warrington Borough Council
