= The Magdala =

Pub in Hampstead, North London

Coordinates: 51°33′20″N 0°09′56″W

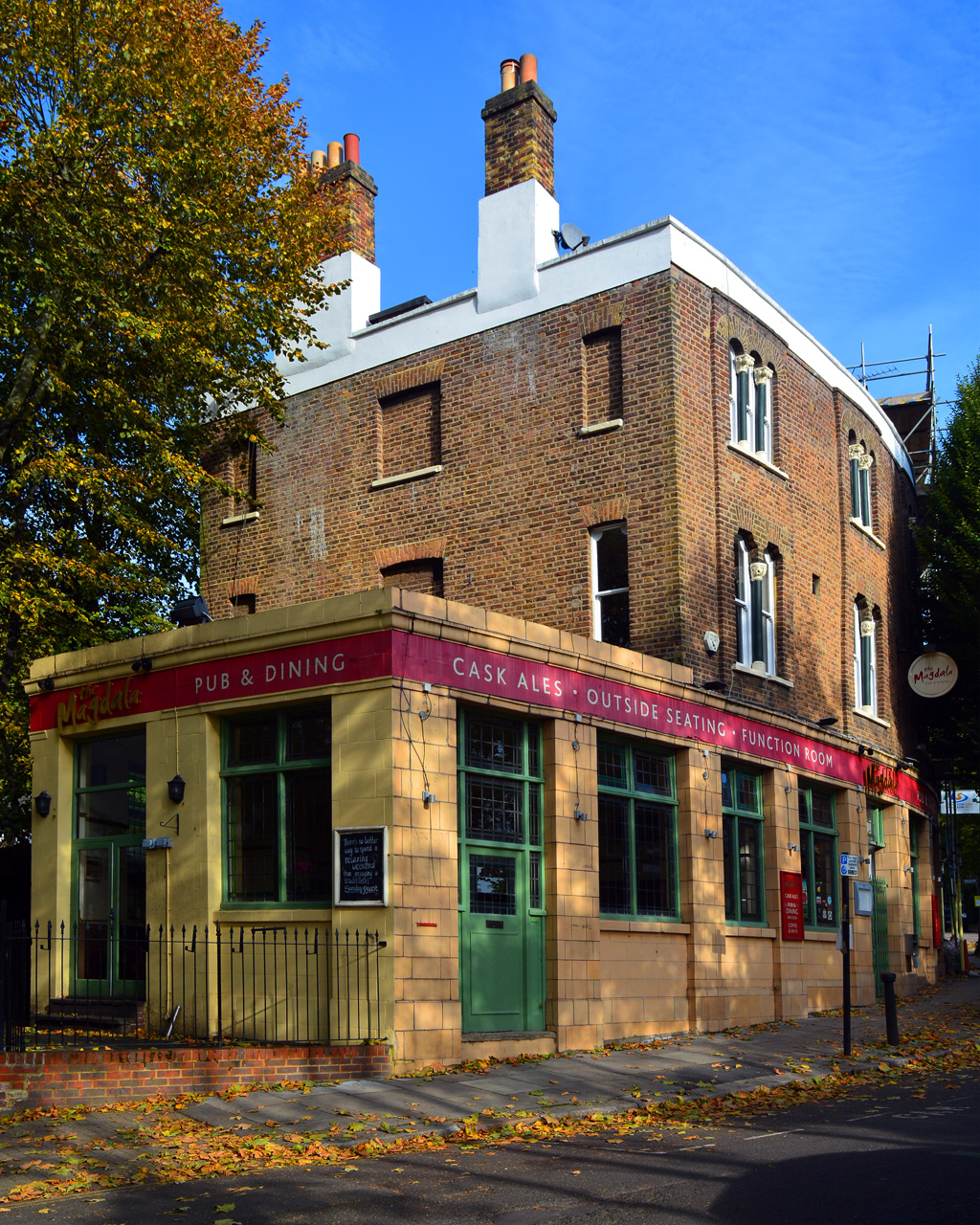
- The pub in 2014
- Interactive map of the The Magdala area

General information
- Location: South Hill Park, Hampstead, London NW3 2SB, England
- Owner: Ori Calif

Website
- www.themagdala.co.uk

The Magdala, also known as The Magdala Tavern or colloquially as simply The Magy, is a pub on South Hill Park in Hampstead, north London. Named after the British victory in the 1868 Battle of Magdala, it was the site of the murder of David Blakely by Ruth Ellis in 1955.

== History ==
The pub building dates back to at least the mid-19th century, being built in mid-Victorian times to serve the developing neighbourhood south of Hampstead Heath. The building was named after the British victory in the 1868 Battle of Magdala.

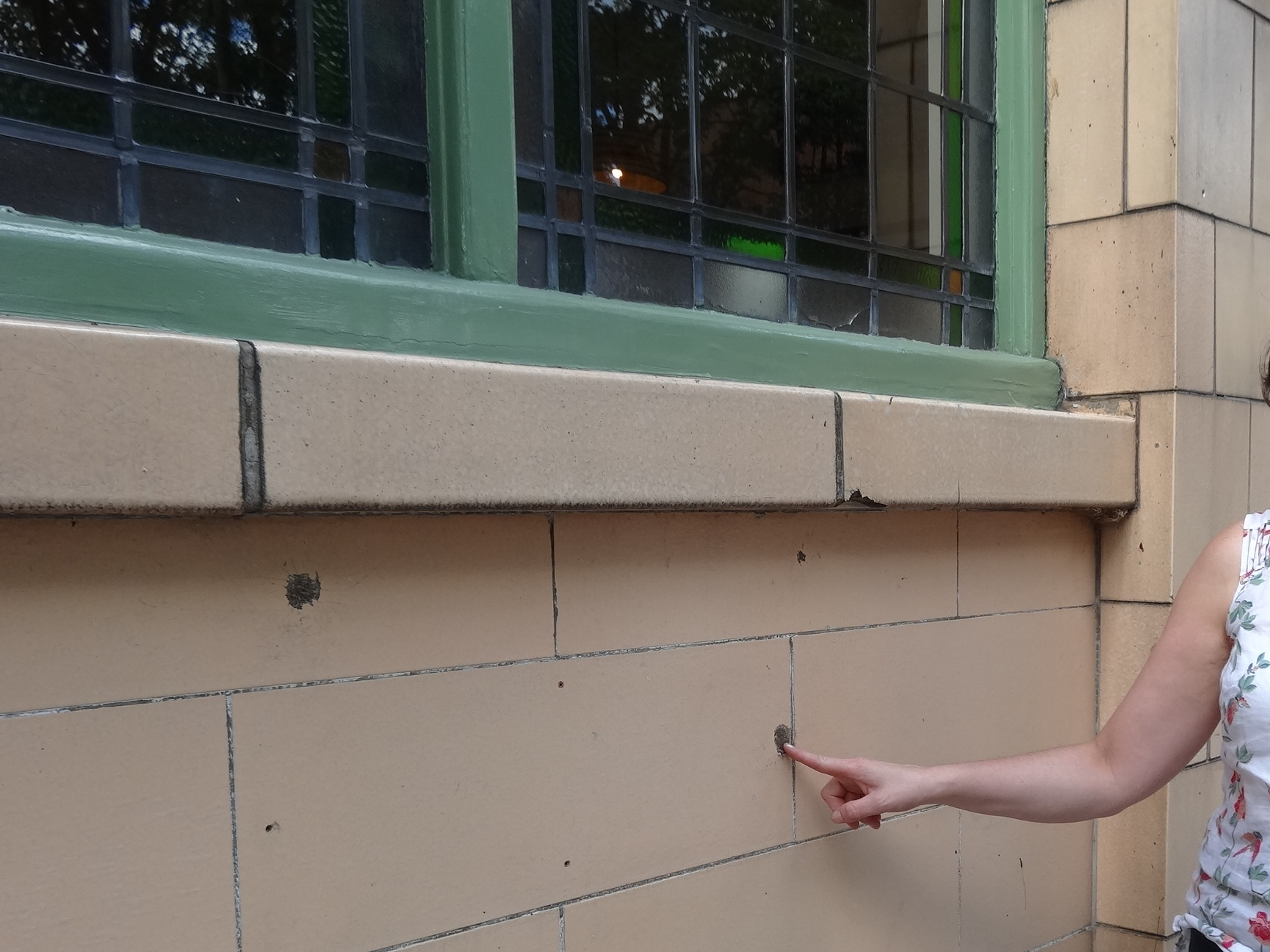
The two "bullet holes" in the wall were drilled by the pub's landlady in the 1990s.

The pub is included in CAMRA's heritage guide for its interior, which includes a "remarkably intact room from the 1930s" with wood panelling, an Art Deco frieze and a Tudor-style pink marble fireplace.

Ruth Ellis, the last woman to be hanged in the United Kingdom, shot her boyfriend David Blakely outside the pub in April 1955.

After closing for refurbishment in 2014, The Magdala reopened in January 2015 before closing again in February 2016, with the upper floors converted to flats. It reopened again as a pub and restaurant in May 2021.

The Magdala has been listed as an Asset of Community Value since September 2014.

== See also ==
- List of assets of community value
