= Chadwell Heath =

Area in East London, England

Coordinates: 51.5757°N 0.144°E

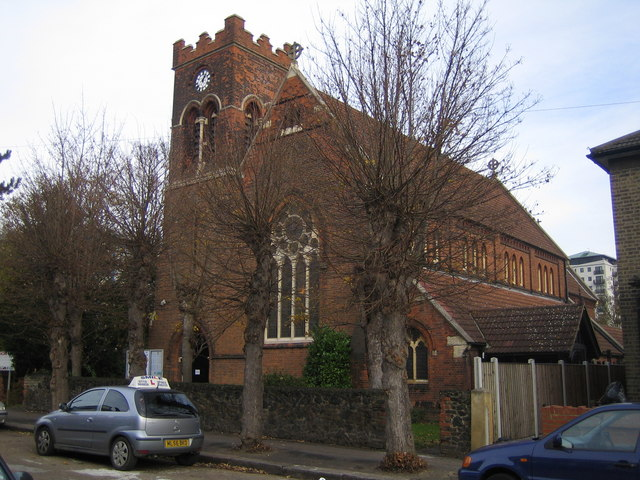
- St Chad's Church

- Location within Greater London
- Population: 24,278 (ward, 2011)
- OS grid reference: TQ485885
  - Charing Cross: 12 mi (19 km) SW
- London borough: Redbridge; Barking & Dagenham
- Ceremonial county: Greater London
- Region: London
- Country: England
- Sovereign state: United Kingdom
- Post town: ROMFORD
- Postcode district: RM6
- Post town: DAGENHAM
- Postcode district: RM8
- Dialling code: 020
- Police: Metropolitan
- Fire: London
- Ambulance: London
- UK Parliament: Dagenham and Rainham; Ilford South
- London Assembly: Havering and Redbridge; City and East

Chadwell Heath is an area in East London, England. It is split between the London Borough of Barking and Dagenham and the London Borough of Redbridge, around 2 miles (3.2 km) west of Romford and 4 miles (6.4 km) east of Ilford, and 12 miles (19 km) north-east of Charing Cross.

== History ==
=== Toponymy ===
The name 'Chadwell' was first recorded in 1254 as Chaudewell and means 'the cold spring'. The name was first applied to a settlement on the Barking (later Ilford) side of the ancient boundary between Dagenham and Barking and it was also known as Chadwell Street, 'Street' having the older meaning of a hamlet. In the 17th century the Blackheath Common in Dagenham parish was renamed Chadwell Heath. As the settlements merged the Chadwell Street name was lost in favour of Chadwell Heath.

=== Economic development ===
The London to Colchester Roman road led to some early development while much of the rest of the area remained rural.

The railway was constructed through the area from Romford and Ilford and in 1864 Chadwell Heath Railway Station was opened. It was the end of the line for both the London tram system and later the electric trolley bus service from Aldgate. The trolley buses turned around at Station Road and Wangey Road.

Suburban growth commenced in 1900 and proceeded rapidly until World War I, increasing after the war.

=== Local government ===
A map showing the wards of Barking Civil Parish as they appeared in 1871.

Chadwell Heath formed a hamlet in the ancient parish of Dagenham, Essex. As Chadwell Heath grew it absorbed the neighbouring hamlet of Chadwell Street in the Chadwell ward of the parish of Barking. The Barking section of Chadwell Heath became part of the new parish of Ilford in 1888. This became Ilford Urban District in 1894. The Dagenham section became part of Romford Rural District in 1894. The parish was removed from the rural district and became Dagenham Urban District in 1926. During the 1920s and 1930s, the local government arrangements of the area came under review and various proposals would have merged the two sections of Chadwell Heath into a single district, however this was not acted upon.

Ilford was incorporated as a municipal borough in 1926 and Dagenham was incorporated in 1938. The arrangements of the area were reviewed again in the 1950s and 1960s. The whole area was considered to form part of the Greater London conurbation and in 1957 formed part of the review area of the Royal Commission on Local Government in Greater London. Following the review, in 1965 the London Government Act 1963 abolished the municipal boroughs of Dagenham and Ilford, and transferred their former area from Essex to Greater London, to form part of the new London Borough of Barking and the London Borough of Redbridge.

=== During the world wars ===
The area suffered several bomb hits during World War II. A large parachute mine also exploded causing extensive residential damage in Bennett Road, destroying the school, while a second failed to explode and its parachute became entangled in horse-chestnut trees near Chadwell Heath Station. It did not explode because it was cradled in very soft soil as the result of digging near Hemmings Bakery. It was found by Walter Wiffen, a train guard from Cedar Park Gardens on his way to work at the station early the next morning. He reported it at the police station, which is now the Eva Hart pub, and oversaw the evacuation of Cedar Park Gardens to the bomb shelter at the corner of Wangey Road and the High Road. A V2 rocket landed on Blackbush Avenue killing several people and blowing out windows for half a mile around. Later, the local council replaced the windows with much more modern frames, and the results provided an incongruous look to the older house designs. A heavy anti-aircraft battery was located east of Whalebone Lane North and traces of the concrete emplacements remain today. A V2 Rocket destroyed two houses in Woodlands Avenue and damaged the houses that had been repaired after the landmine that had destroyed the Whalebone Junior school in Bennett Road.

== Demographics ==
In the 2011 census, the combined wards of Chadwell in Redbridge and Chadwell Heath in Barking and Dagenham had a total population of 24,278 people.

The two combined wards had no single ethnic majority, with the largest group being White British people comprising 44.3% of the population. The next largest groups were Indians (9.5%), Black Africans (9.3%), Black Caribbeans (5.7%), Bangladeshis (5.6%), Pakistanis (5.5%) and Other Whites (5.2%).

== Geography ==
Chadwell Heath is split between the London Boroughs of Redbridge and Barking & Dagenham. Most of the major buildings, such as the local school and former police station lie in the London Borough of Redbridge. Royal Mail includes Chadwell Heath as part of the RM6 postcode district and the Post Town of Romford.

The area has 3 allotments: one adjacent to St Chad's Park on Alexandra Road, the other on Chadwell Heath Lane, and the third in Little Heath next to the Eastern Avenue/A12.

The local school is Chadwell Heath Academy, but there are many other large schools nearby, such as Mayfield School and Chadwell Heath Primary School.

== Transport ==
Chadwell Heath is served by London Buses and the Elizabeth Line at Chadwell Heath Railway Station. London Buses routes that serve Chadwell Heath are the 62 from Marks Gate 'Billet Road' to Barking 'Gascoigne Estate'; 86 from Romford Station to Stratford Station; 173 from King George Hospital 'Goodmayes' to Beckton Station; 362 from King George Hospital 'Goodmayes' to Grange Hill Station; 368 from Chadwell Heath 'Police Station' to Barking 'Harts Lane' and night bus N86 from Stratford Station to Harold Hill 'Dagnam Park Square'.

== The Eva Hart Public House ==
Eva Hart (died 1996) lived in Chadwell Heath for a large part of her life. She was one of the few people who survived the sinking of the Titanic.

The former police station at 1128 High Road Chadwell Heath ("Police" can still be seen on the frieze of the building) was renovated and converted into a pub, and named after her.

== St Chad's Park ==
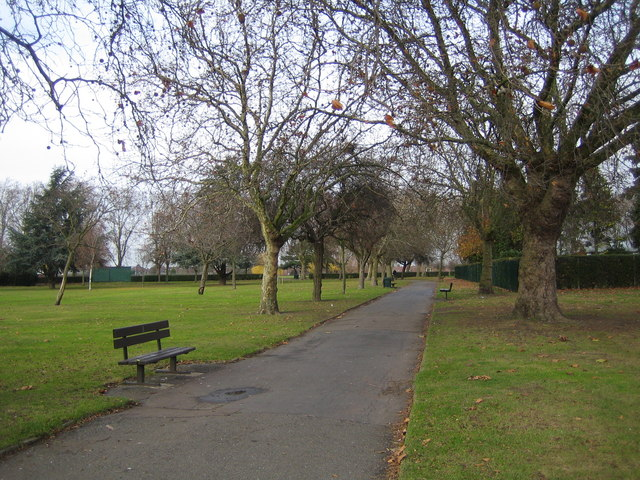
St Chad's Park

The local park is St Chad's Park, a 1/4km2 sized field lined with trees. It is the oldest park in Barking and Dagenham, being laid in 1830. It contains an outdoor gym for public use.

== Embassy Cinema ==
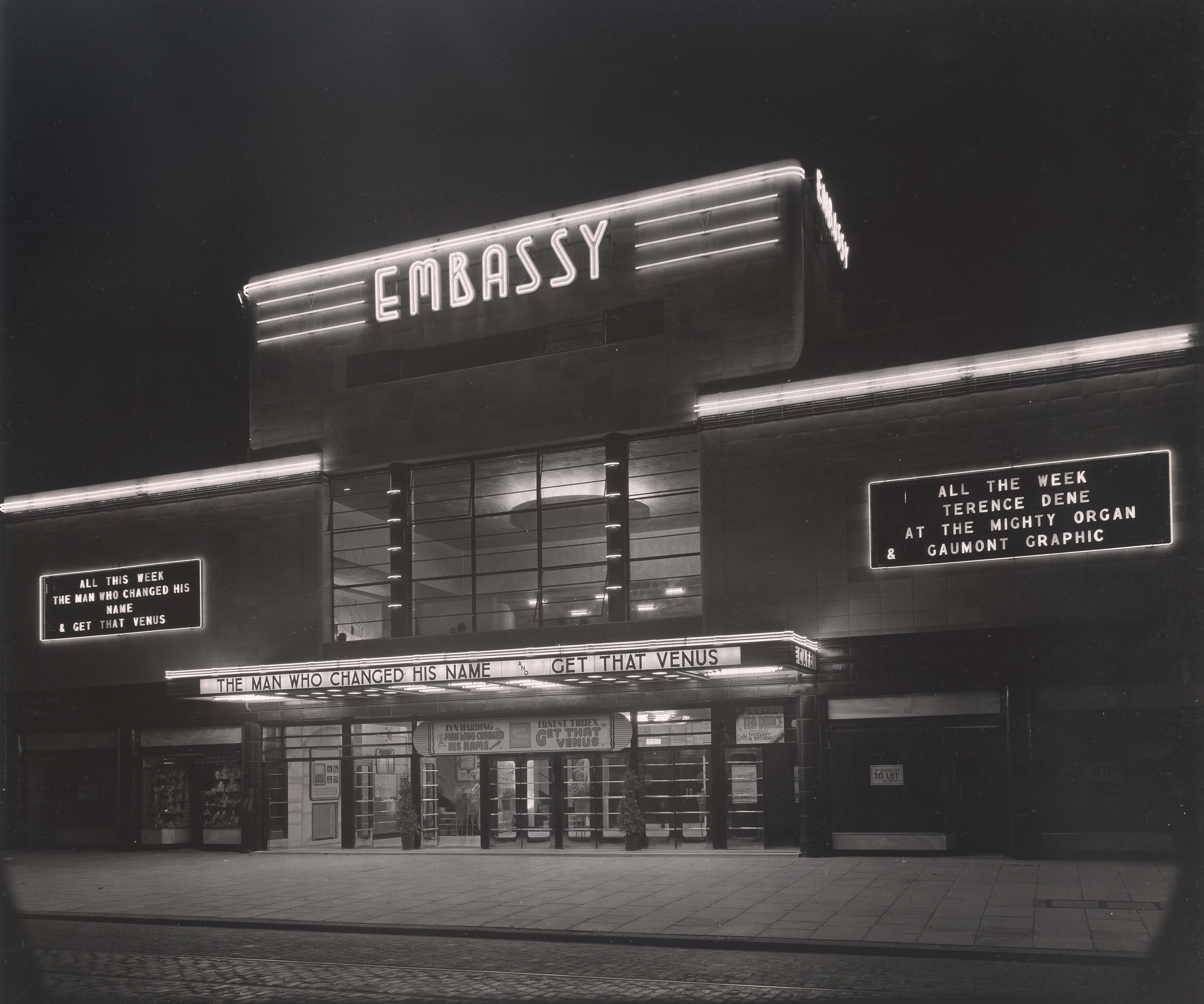
Embassy Cinema

There is an Art Deco former cinema on Chadwell Heath High Road, built in May 1934. It was originally called the Embassy Cinema; later it became part of the Gaumont British Circuit. During the late 1960s, it was converted into a Bingo Hall - known to many locals as the Mecca Bingo Hall. In August 2017, the building was listed as an Asset of Community Value by the 'Chadwell Heath South Residents' Association'. The premises currently [when?] house Mayfair Venue, an events centre.

== Religion ==
The Roman Catholic Church of St Bede is on Bishops Avenue. St Chad's Church (Church of England) stands on St Chad's Road. Chadwell Heath has 2 baptist churches. Other churches include the United Reformed Church (URC), and the Brethren Assembly in Wangey Road.

== Sport ==
West Ham United's training ground was located in the area until late 2015. On 10 December 2015, Slaven Bilic, the then manager of West Ham, announced that from the 14 December the club would be moving from the old training ground (at Saville Road) to the new training ground at nearby Rush Green, London. Chadwell Heath is also home to St.Chad's Bowling Club. In 2023 it became the London Borough of Barking and Dagenham's sole surviving outdoor bowling club. Situated in St. Chad's Park the bowling club was founded well over 60 years ago.

== Notable residents ==
- Mary Wollstonecraft
- Henry Gillard Glindoni
- Eva Hart
- Jessie J
- Millicent Martin
- Michelle Dockery
- Mark Summers
- Rhian Brewster
- Jackie Oliver
- Mark Lazarus
- Jim Peters (athlete)
- Nicky Shorey
- Victor Lewis-Smith
- Micheal Ward
