= Darren John =

English artist (born 1987)

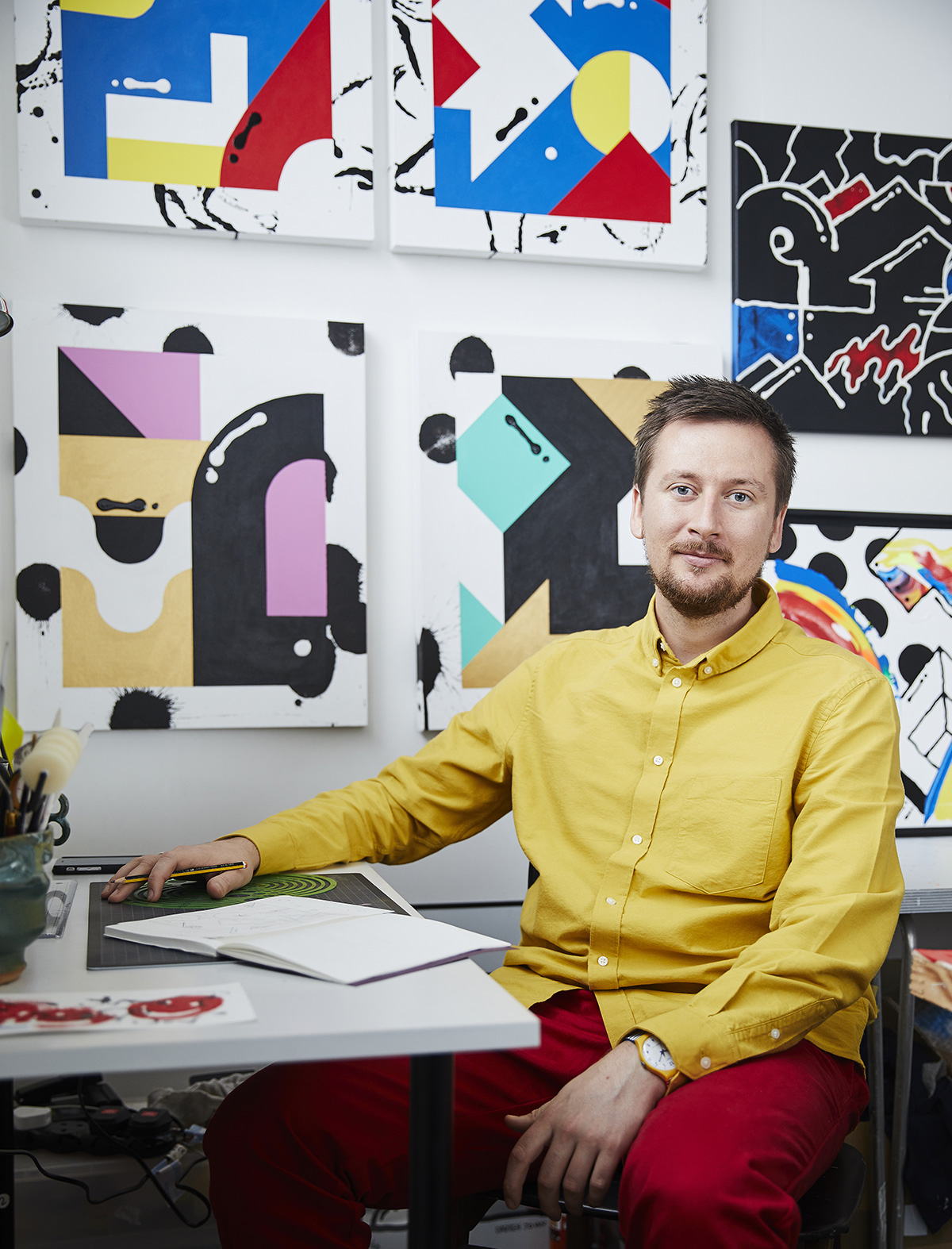
- Darren John in his London Studio, 2018.
- Born: Darren John Reeves; April 28, 1987 (age 39); Hampshire, England
- Known for: Painting
- Website: www.iamdarrenjohn.com

Darren John (born 28 April 1987) is a London-based artist and image-maker whose primary concern as an artist is the value of creative imagination.

John has exhibited extensively since 2009 and had his debut solo show Portal which took place at Proof Gallery London in March 2016.

Alongside his personal art practice, Darren is a founder and lead artist at Absolutely Studio - a creative studio dedicated to artistic practice and painted application. The studio has painted works on behalf of Sue Webster, Camille Walala, I Love Dust, Hattie Stewart, Tristan Eaton and many other notable artist and designers.

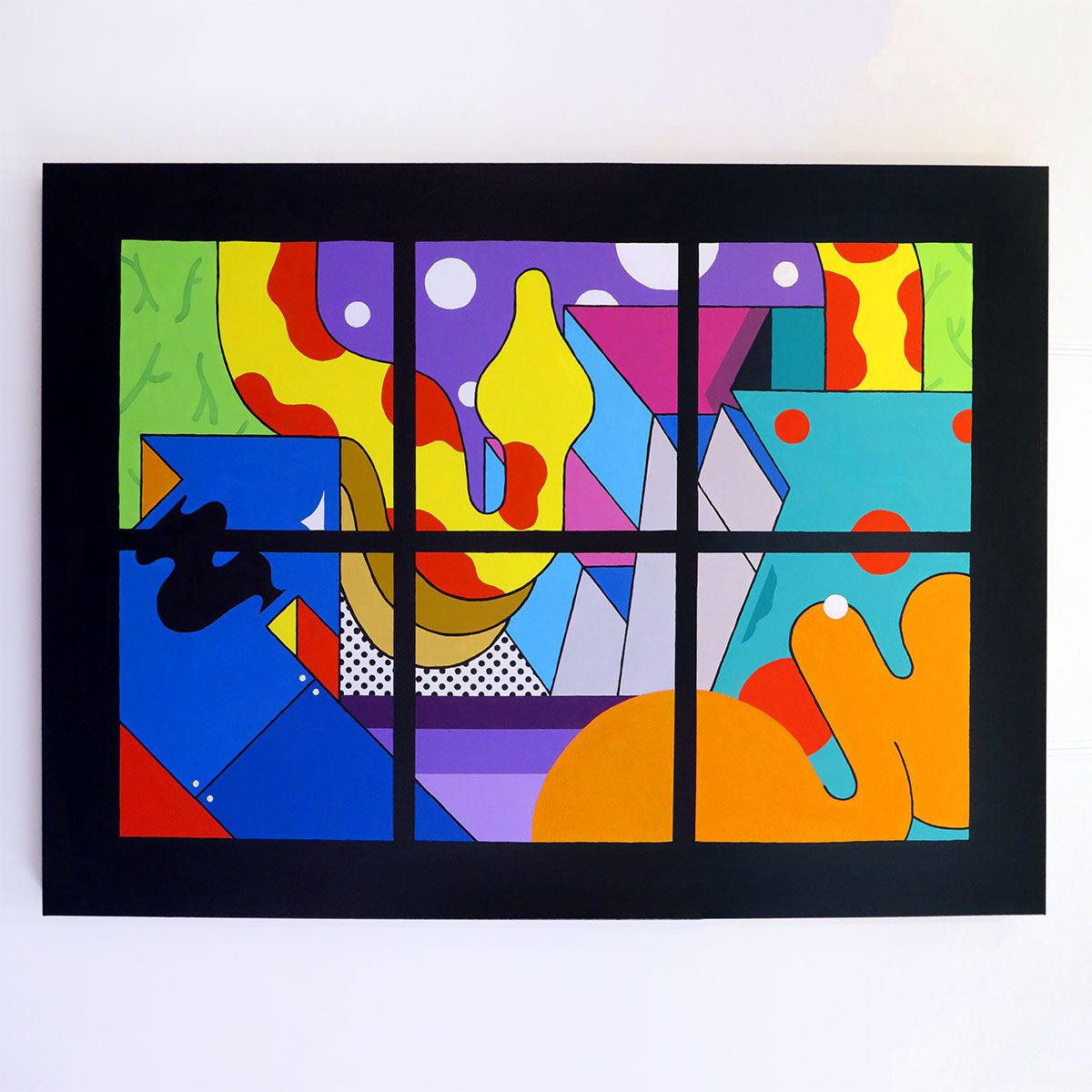

John is a dedicated skateboarder and has contributed multiple times to the Long Live Southbank campaign to preserve the undercroft skate spot at South bank. One such occasion was representing LLSB at the Royal Academy of Arts, producing artwork inspired by 70s California to coincide with their exhibition of works by Richard Diebenkorn and in particular his Ocean Park series of works.

== Style ==
John's bold landscape appropriates the iconography of the cartoon with a visual language that aims to channel the mind set of creativity in all its spontaneity. His compositions are meticulous in detail and precise in their construction.

== Solo exhibitions ==
- “Form + Beyond” | 2017 Clerkenwell Design Week, London, UK
- "Parallel" | 2016 Moniker Art Fair, London, UK
- “Parallel” | 2016 Boxpark, London, UK
- “Parallel” | 2016 Upstairs Gallery, Stoke-on-Trent, UK
- "Portal" | 2016 Proof Gallery, London, UK. Solo Show.
- "Same But Different" | 2014 The Graffiti Life Gallery, London, UK. Two-man Solo Show.

== Group exhibitions ==
- 2020
  - "Keith Haring: Radiant Gambit" | World Chess Hall of Fame, St. Louis, USA
  - "Creativity Under Quarantine" | Online exhibition - creativityunderquarantine.com
- 2019
  - Folklore, Damn Fine Print, Dublin, Ireland
  - Hyper-Colour-Pop-Culture, Alon Zakaim Fine Art, London, UK
  - Spring Auction, Menier Gallery, London, UK
  - Good Day, Stour Space, London, UK
- 2018
  - Painted Pieces, World Chess Hall of Fame, St. Louis, USA
- 2017
  - Summer Showcase, Creative Debuts, London, UK
  - Brick(2)Brick, The Brick Gallery, Sheffield, UK
  - Christmas Bizarre, Well Hung, London, UK
  - Good Day, Stour Space, London, UK
- 2016 and prior
  - "Pick Me Up" | 2016 Somerset House, London, UK. Group Show.
  - "Stay Sharp" | 2016 Station Co., Denver, USA. Group Show.
  - "Fore" | 2015 The Winemakers Club, London. Group Show.
  - "The Good Boys" | 2015 Zap Arts Gallery, Liverpool, UK. Group Show.

== Lectures ==
- 2020 UAL MA Illustration & Visual Media, London, UK
- 2020 Cambridge School of Visual & Performing Arts, Cambridge, UK
