= St Chad's Church, Chadwell Heath =

Church in Chadwell Heath, London, England

Coordinates: 51°34′16.1″N 0°8′10.3″E

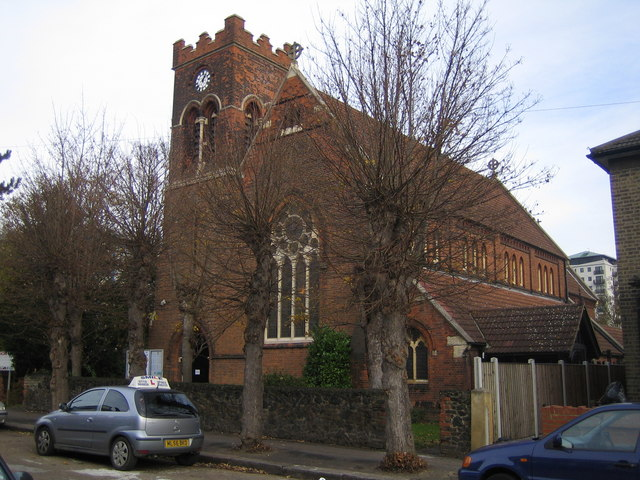
St Chad's Church

St Chad's Church is the Church of England parish church for the area of Chadwell Heath in east London. It stands on St Chad's Road, next to the White Horse public House. It is dedicated to Chad, brother of Cedd.

It was founded as a chapel of ease to St Peter and St Paul's Church, the main parish church for Dagenham in 1886 and nine years later a separate parish of Chadwell Heath was established, made up of Chadwell Heath itself, Marks Gate in Dagenham and part of Ilford's Chadwell Street. It is a redbrick building with stone dressings and a crenellated tower.
