= Community asset transfer =

Community asset transfer (CAT) is a procedure under United Kingdom law that allows a local community to take on the ownership or management of publicly owned buildings or land, at less than market rates, for the purposes of promoting social, economic and environmental well-being. Agreement by the public body is at their own discretion.

A pilot project, Advancing Assets for Communities, took place in Birmingham in 2008. A national organisation called the Asset Transfer Unit was established to oversee the initiative, and to support both parties in CAT arrangements.

There were around 1,500 such transfers in England in the period 2011–2012. Premises subject to the procedure, said to be in community asset ownership, now number in the thousands.

The procedure is distinct from the assets of community value initiative, although the two are often conflated. It is also distinct from the related community right to bid, which allows community groups to have a "first refusal" if premises of community interest, such as community halls or pubs, are put up for sale by public or private owners.
