= Mayfield School, Goodmayes =

Mayfield School
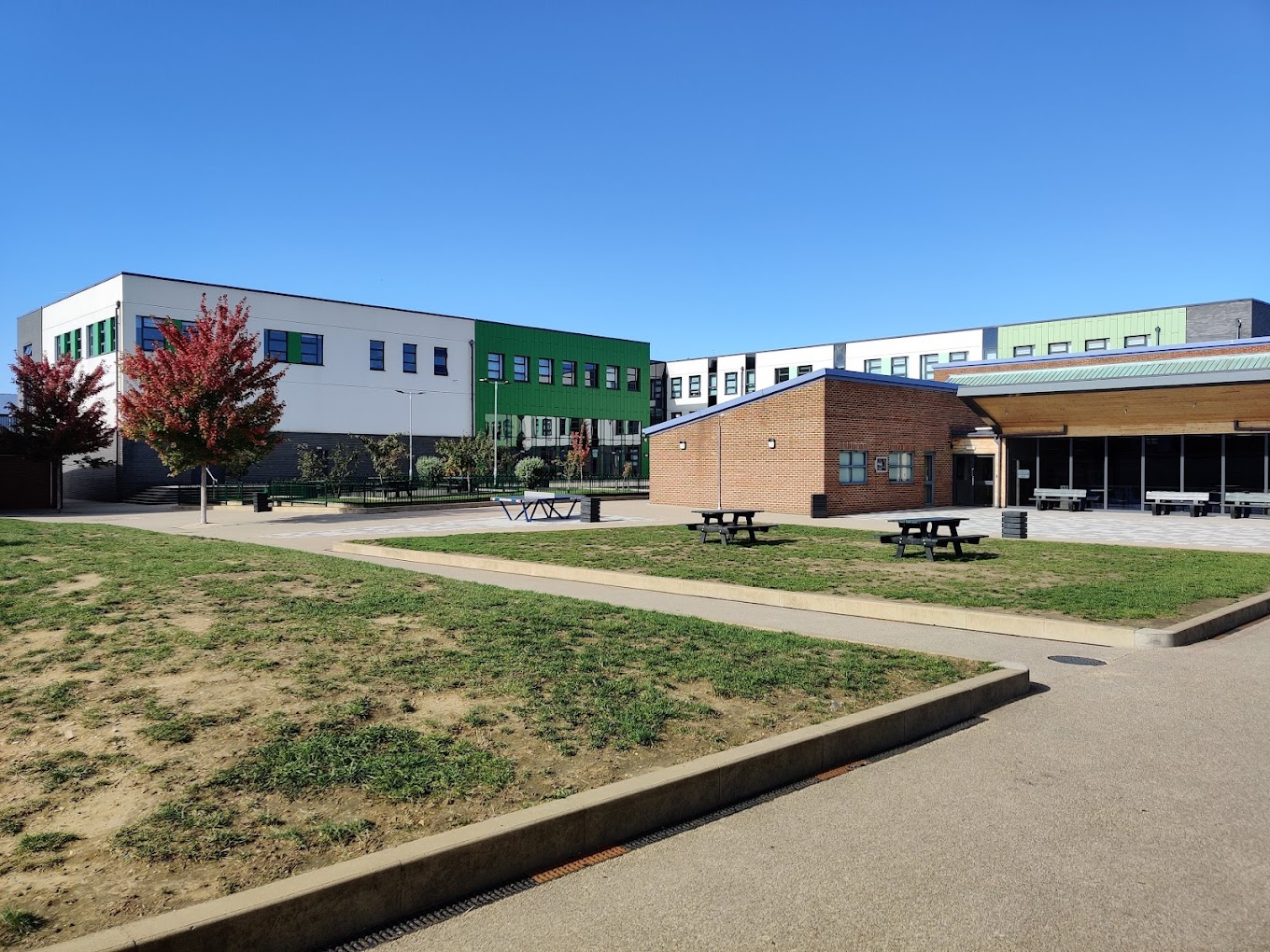

Location
- Pedley Road; Goodmayes, London; England; 51°33′52″N 0°07′13″E

Information
- Type: Foundation
- Motto: Being the best that we can be
- Established: 1978
- Local authority: Redbridge
- Department for Education URN: 102858 Tables
- Ofsted: Reports
- Headteacher: Remo Iafrate
- Gender: Co-educational
- Age: 11 to 19
- Enrolment: Over 1300
- Colours: Green and Black
- Website: www.mayfieldschool.net

Mayfield School is a co-educational secondary school and 6th form in Chadwell Heath in the Goodmayes district of the London Borough of Redbridge, in East London, on Pedley Road. Nearby transport includes Chadwell Heath Railway Station and Goodmayes Railway Station.

== Facilities ==
Each year has 10 form classes, with around 30 students in each one. The school has a leisure centre, Mayfield Leisure Centre, which is accessible to the public at times. The school has one of the largest sites in the London Borough of Redbridge.

== Notable former students ==
Singer Jessica Ellen Cornish, known as Jessie J, attended Mayfield from 1999 to 2004.
