= Embassy Cinema =

- Gaumont Palace Theatre, Gaumont Theatre, Odeon Chadwell Heath
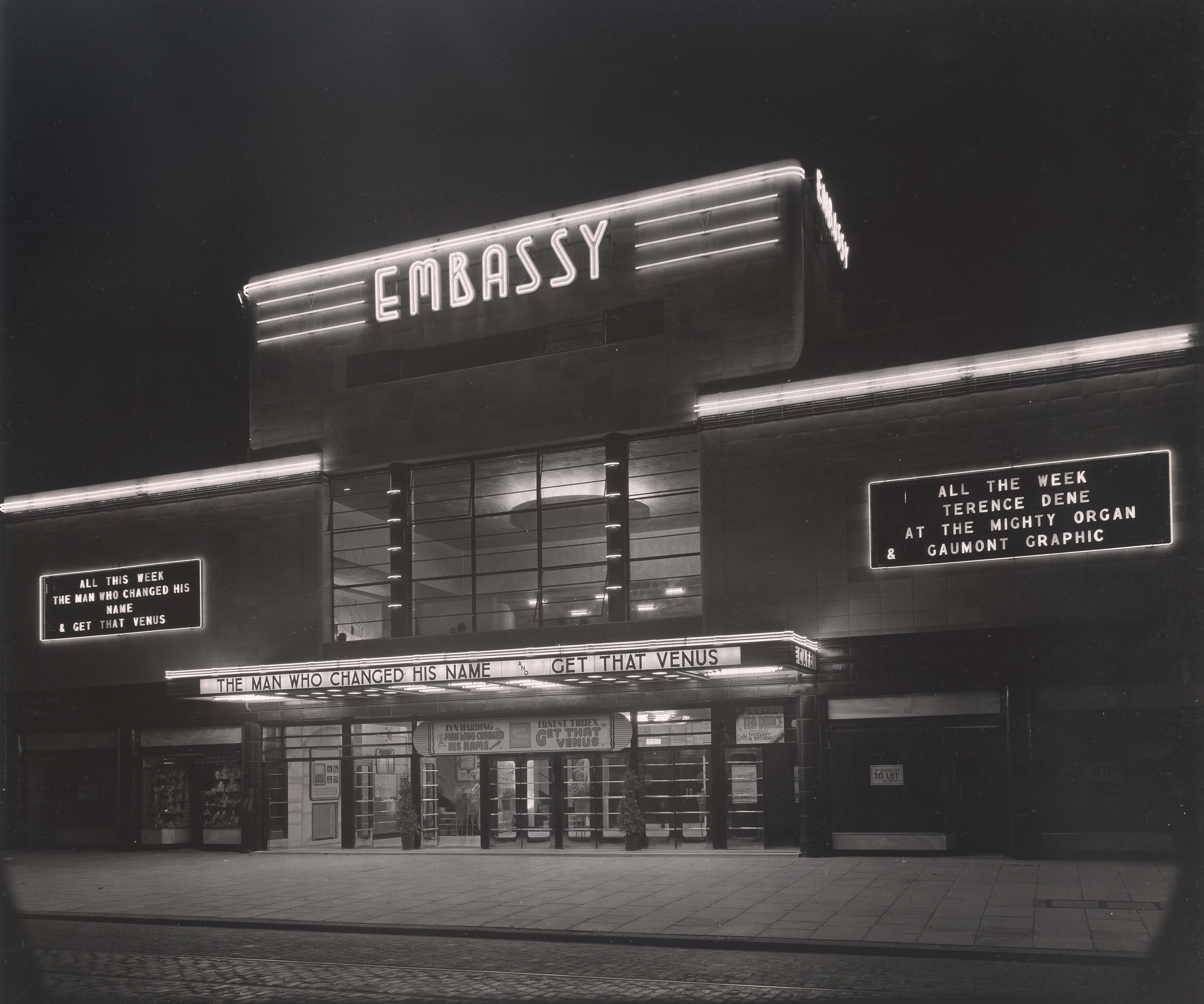
- Embassy Cinema, facade by night (1934)
- Interactive map of Embassy Cinema
- Address: High Road; Chadwell Heath; Greater London, UK
- Coordinates: 51.569935°N 0.128395°E
- Owner: Vinod Nagrecha & Hasmukh Nagrecha
- Capacity: Originally 1,812
- Designation: Asset of Community Value
- Current use: Banqueting Suite

Construction
- Years active: 1934-1966
- Architect: Harry Weston

Tenant
- Mayfair Venue - Mr Wazid Hassan (Shelim)

The Embassy Cinema is a former cinema in the town of Chadwell Heath, Greater London. It was once known, among locals, as The Gaumont. It was designed in an art deco style, with a streamline moderne interior, by Harry Weston in 1934. The building is situated on the border of Redbridge and Barking & Dagenham, in the Chadwell Heath District Centre. The cinema closed in 1966 and became a Bingo Hall. In 2015, following the closure of the Bingo Hall, it was then used as a wedding hall/banqueting suite. The building was listed as an Asset of Community Value by the 'Chadwell Heath South Residents' Association' in August 2017 and is currently the focus of a major cinema restoration project.

== History ==
=== Early Cinema Years, 1934-1966 ===
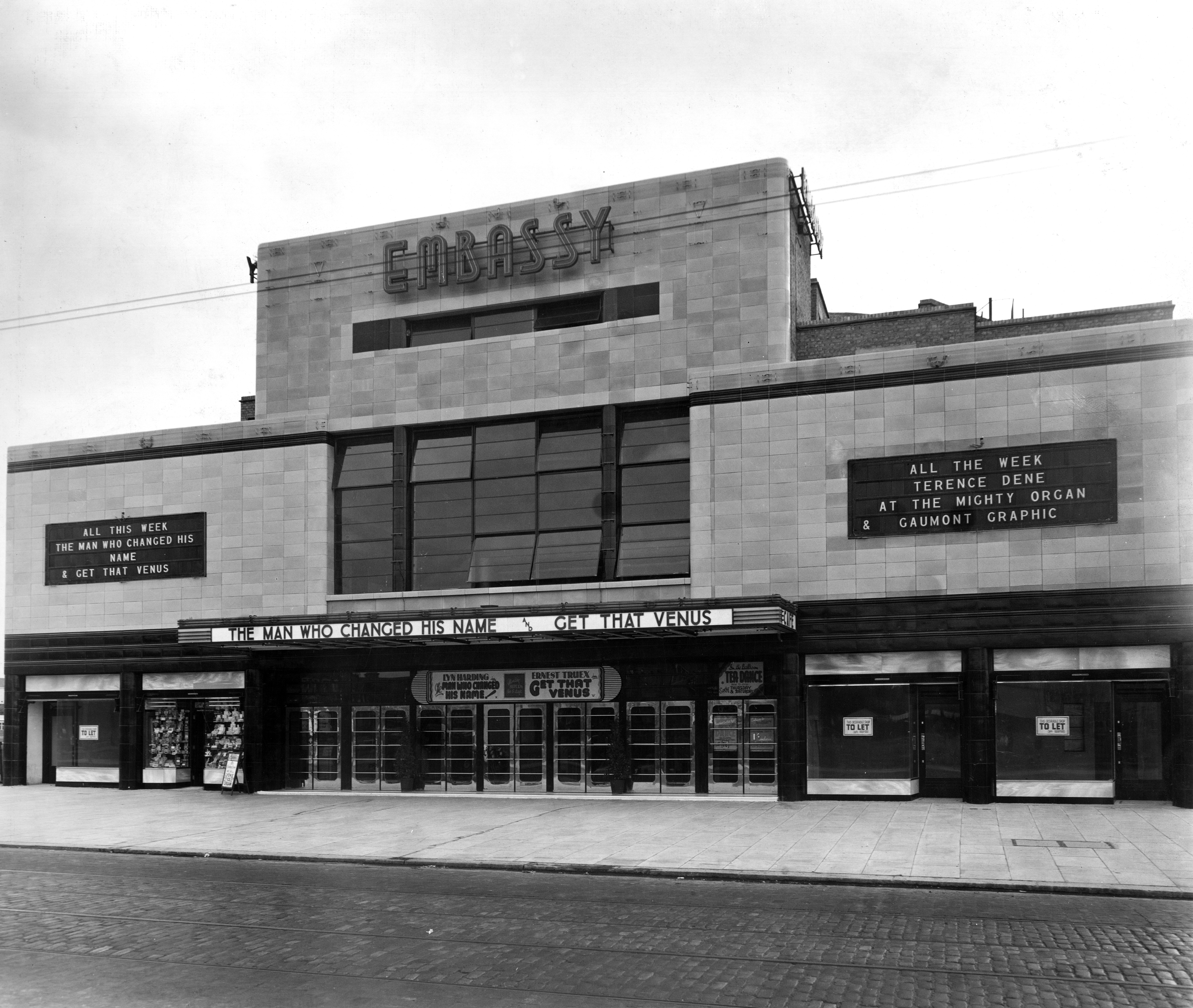
Embassy Cinema, facade by day (1934)

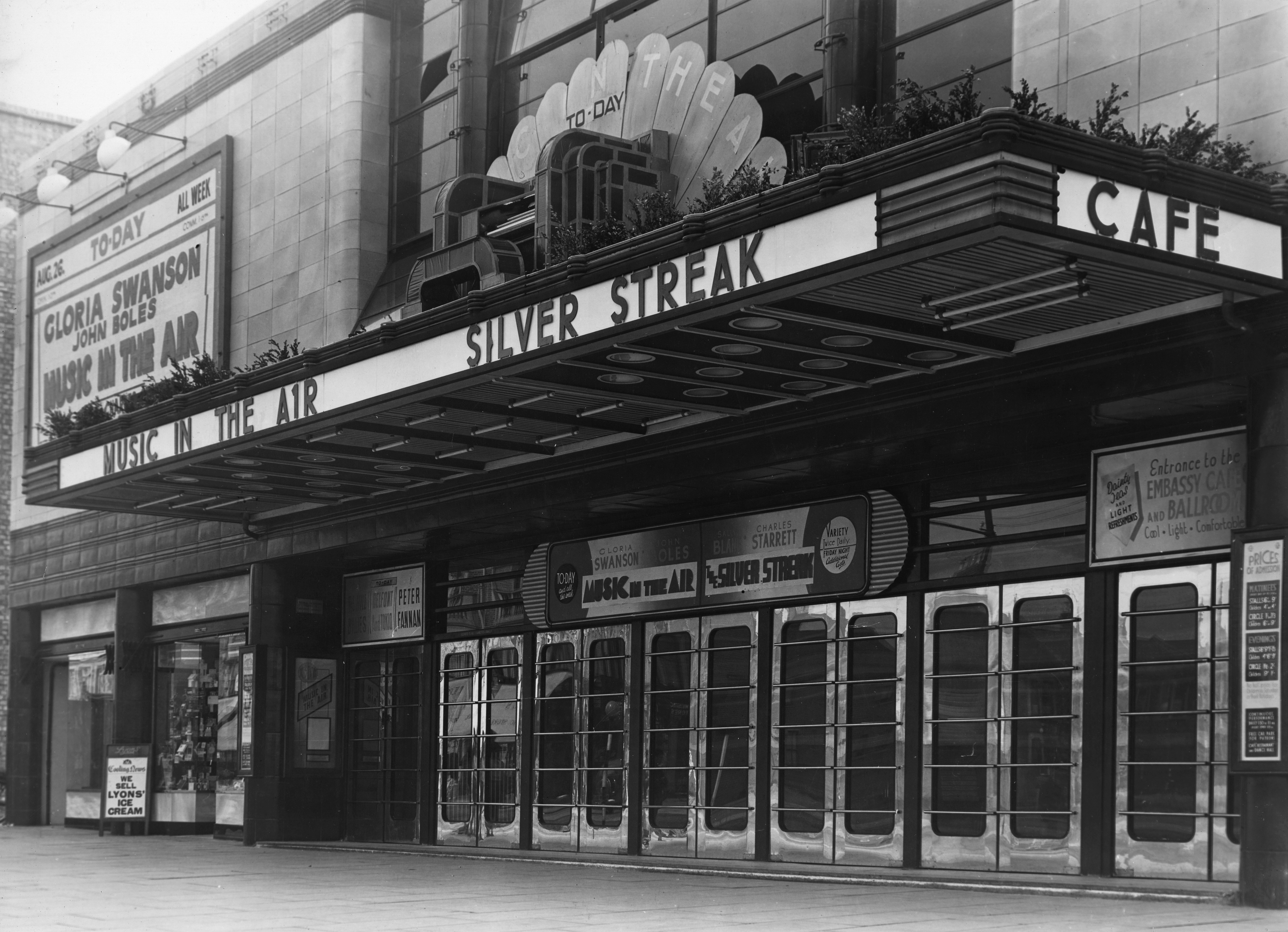
Embassy Cinema, canopy (1935)

The Embassy Cinema was opened on 17 May 1934 by the Mayor of Ilford, Alderman B.S.J Pitt. It featured 1,812 seats: 1,232 in the stalls and 580 in the circle. A number of local newspapers cited it as "the last word in splendour and comfort". Construction began in mid-December 1933, and the majority of it lasted for only twenty-two weeks. It was designed and part-owned by the architect Harry Weston, and was the second of eight cinemas that he is known to have designed. He had previously designed the Plaza Cinema in Worthing (1933) and went on to design another six cinemas during the 1930s, mostly for the Gaumont British Picture Corporation. It was known as a 'Super Cinema' as it also incorporated theatre, staging live variety shows and orchestral/organ performances. The Managing Directors, Charles A. Sinden and Mr P. Lyons, as well as the Secretary of 'Embassy (Chadwell Heath) Ltd.', Mr R. Teppett, were instrumental in the creation of the cinema.

'A Short Story about The Embassy', a history of the cinema produced by Lyons, was one of the first films to be shown on the opening night. The programme was continued with a Mickey Mouse Disney cartoon, 'Fury of the Jungle' featuring Donald Cook and Peggy Shannon, and Constance Cummings in Broadway Through a Keyhole.

Five months after the Embassy Cinema opened, it was taken over by Provincial Cinematograph Theatres (PCT) as part of the Gaumont chain, and operated as the 'Gaumont Palace Theatre' from October 1934. It ran throughout the Second World War and was never sub-divided.

The Gaumont Palace Theatre was re-named 'Gaumont Theatre', from 1937, and continued under Gaumont British management. After the Second World War, Picture Palaces all over Britain began free entertainment for children. This was known as 'The Saturday Morning Picture Club'. A published extract from the memories of a local resident of Chadwell Heath, Patricia Duyshart, described the frivolities in depth:

"The Gaumont Cinema in Chadwell Heath issued all children with free passes that were shown on entry. Long before opening time, huge crowds of squabbling children were queuing up outside the cinema, all of them trying to push in the line...When the doors at last opened, there was the biggest rush you ever saw..."

In February 1964, the Gaumont Theatre was taken over by the Rank Organisation and re-named the Odeon Chadwell Heath. However, it ultimately closed as a cinema on 28 July 1966 with James Garner in Duel at Diablo and Bob Hope in 'Boy, Did I Get A Wrong Number' as the final screenings.

=== Bingo Hall, 1966–2014 ===
Within hours of the closing of the doors, to the Odeon Chadwell Heath, workmen moved in to convert the cinema into a Bingo Hall. The auditorium was completely redecorated, and the foyer was transformed into a buffet. The projectors and Compton organ were sold, and the large screen was removed. It was to be open for seven days a week with two matinees on Mondays and Thursdays. The Bingo hall was the fifty-second ever Rank club, but the first Rank hall in the area – the premises was re-named as 'The Top Rank Club'.

The opening night was hosted by Tommy Trinder (CBE).

Top Rank's area manager stated: "We decided to go over to bingo in June, because there are already plenty of cinemas – in Whalebone Lane and Romford – but very few bingo halls in this part of London."

The hall was equipped with a closed-circuit television and direct contact via teleprinters, to enable the bingo players to compete with Top Rank Club members in the 52 other halls all over Britain.

Decades later, the club began operating as a Mecca Bingo.

The hall closed on 15 June 2014. More than 400 people attended the final night of bingo. Falling membership meant that the owners, Rank Plc, believe it financially viable to renew the lease. The smoking ban in England, as well as the Great Recession, had been the main factors in the loss of members.

=== Banqueting Suite, 2015-present ===
After a short vacant period, the premises was acquired by Vinod Nagrecha and Hasmukh Nagrecha and a lease was granted to Wazid Hassan (Shelim) to create a venue for weddings and other functions. The refurbishment process lasted for nine months, and the building re-opened as the current Mayfair Venue in December 2015. The Mayor of Redbridge, Councillor Barbara White, attended the grand opening with around 800 guests.

Redbridge Council repeatedly refused planning permission for the building to be used as a venue for hire, banqueting suite, wedding hall or conference centre. Three change of use planning applications were refused in 2017, 2019 and 2020.

In June 2018, Redbridge Council issued an enforcement notice to the owners to "cease the unauthorised use of the premises as a banqueting hall/venue for hire" as it was "considered to be having a negative impact on the amenity of the surrounding residences as a result of noise, disturbance, anti-social behaviour and parking issues". The local authority stated that the owners failed to demonstrate how the Mayfair Venue satisfies "a local need". The owners of the Mayfair Venue appealed this notice to the Planning Inspectorate, but inspectors concluded that the use of the premises as a venue available for hire is a breach of planning regulations and the enforcement notice was upheld.

The owners were ordered to stop using the building as a banqueting suite by 15 January 2020 or face prosecution.

=== Restoration Project ===
On 8 August 2017, the Chadwell Heath South Residents' Association successfully listed the Embassy Cinema as an Asset of Community Value.

The community group then launched a restoration project with the goal of creating a new "cultural epicentre" of Redbridge and Barking and Dagenham by acquiring the building and restoring it to a two-screen cinema and shared community space - a project which is estimated to cost more than £3,000,000.

In August 2018, the Chadwell Heath South Residents' Association were awarded a grant, for the sum of £14,940 by the Power to Change Trust and the Ministry of Housing, Communities and Local Government, to fund a feasibility study for the restoration project. The study consisted of architectural feasibility, business viability and market research. It was published in May 2019, yielding successful results.

== Architecture ==
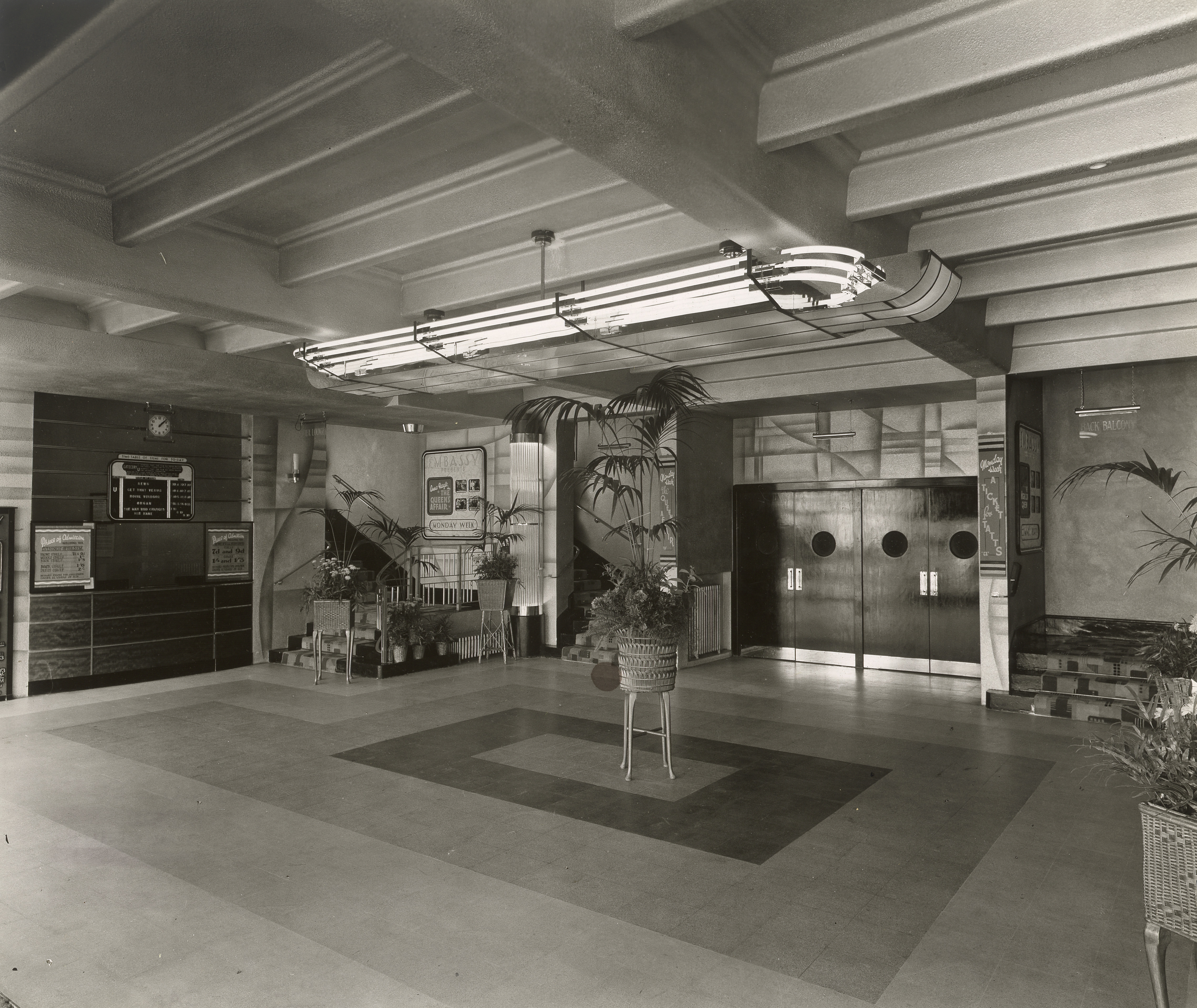
Embassy Cinema, foyer (1934)

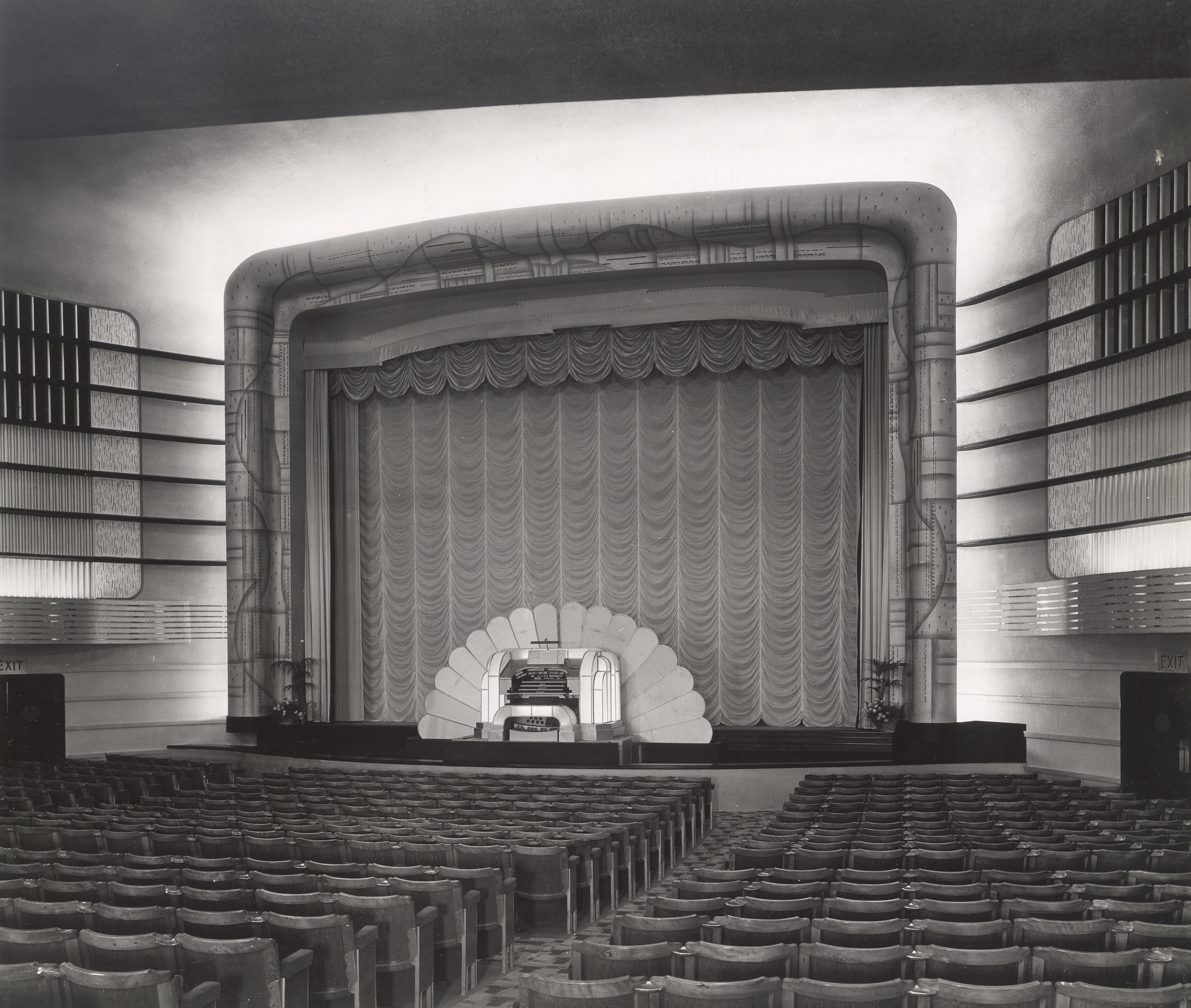
Embassy Cinema, auditorium (1934)

Harry Weston designed the Embassy Cinema in a more lavish style than would have been usual for a Gaumont Cinema. Its façade had a Modernist horizontal emphasis, faced in cream/'biscuit' coloured faience tiling above and black faience tiles below, with chromium plated fittings, enhanced by neon strip lighting and illuminated signs at night. There is a large window over the entrance which allows light into the ballroom. The double-height entrance foyer behind featured Art Deco metalwork and a floodlit glass column of crystalline rods. The auditorium originally had a ‘saucered’ floor to improve sight-lines from the seats. The splay walls featured horizontal fins which extended across decorative panels and grillwork, leading towards the proscenium arch which was backlit from the rim.

Many of these features have survived, and show how Weston carried his Art Deco/streamline moderne style throughout all of his cinema’s spaces and details.

== Features ==
The Embassy Cinema encompassed a number of innovative ideas, some of which were unknown in the cinema world at the time. It featured a tea-lounge and artistic café, as well as a ballroom for dancing to the sound of a live orchestra.

A 24-foot deep stage and orchestra pit, in the auditorium, could accommodate live performances as there were also four adjacent dressing rooms. The large screen was controlled by a mechanism, that could make it move backwards and forwards. When a picture was showing it was lowered towards the audience, thereby minimising eye-strain. The latest system of Western Electric wide-range apparatus provided rich sound quality and substantially high production value; Sinden and Lyons wanted to ensure that hearing would be perfect from every seat in the house. Concealed lighting was fitted throughout the building, and controlled from the roof, to achieve special, flat skylight effects.

To lower the levels of humidity, the air, to the amount of two million cubic feet per hour, was drawn into a purifying chamber by huge, electric fans. It was then filtered, washed, heated and cooled by means of this inventive ventilation system; thus ensuring equable temperature in all seasons.

The projector room was large enough to contain three to five projectors, and lighting control boxes for the stage, balcony and auditorium (manufactured by 'Major Equipment Co. Ltd' of Westminster).

The auditorium housed a Compton 3-manual/8-rank organ. The glass console of the organ had a unique green colour scheme, and the special illumination was an idea introduced by Lyons; an innovation that he perfected years earlier, and one of the first of its kind in Britain.

The decoration scheme followed lines of effective simplicity, with the dominating colour of the wall being old gold. The seats were of the tip-up variety, upholstered in green velvet. The carpets were green and beige, whilst the curtains, hangings (and even the uniforms of the ushers and attendants) also embodied the same colour scheme.

== See also ==
- Rio Cinema, Dalston
- The Rex, Berkhamsted
- Odyssey Cinema, St Albans
- Regent Street Cinema
