= South End Road =

Street in London, England

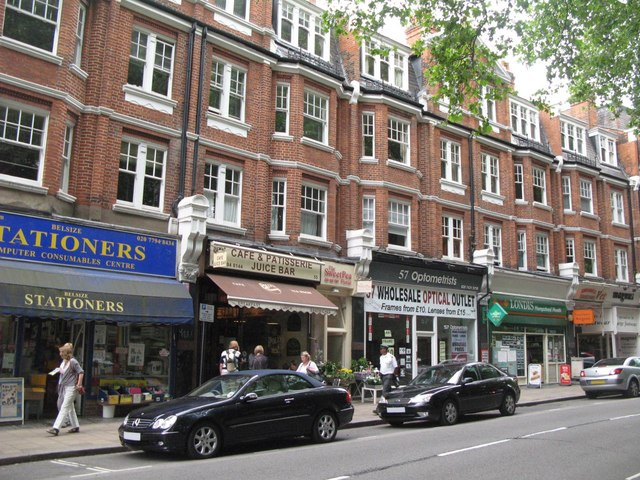
The commercial southern end of South End Road.

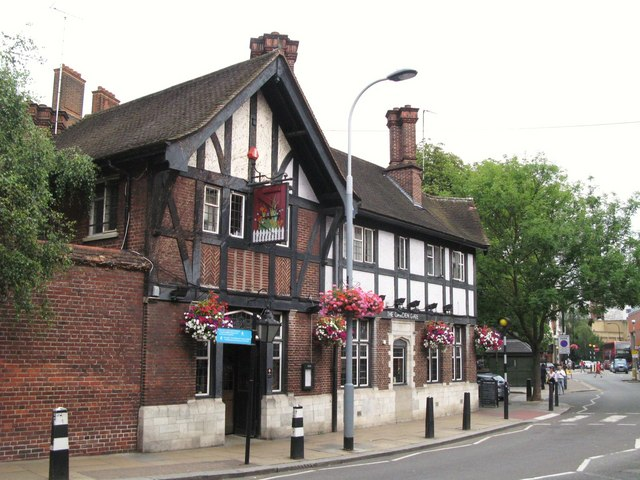
The Garden Gate.

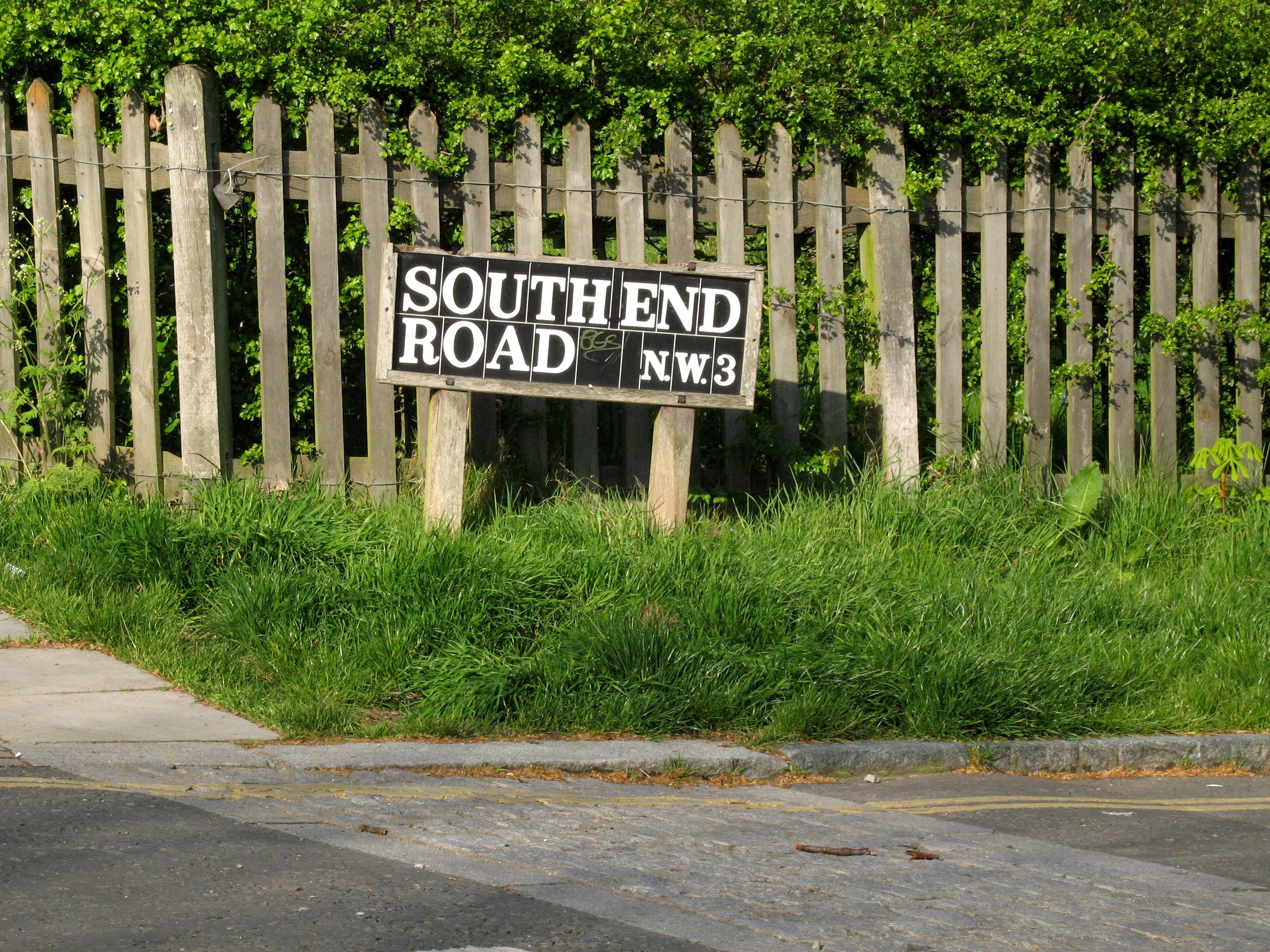
Historic street sign

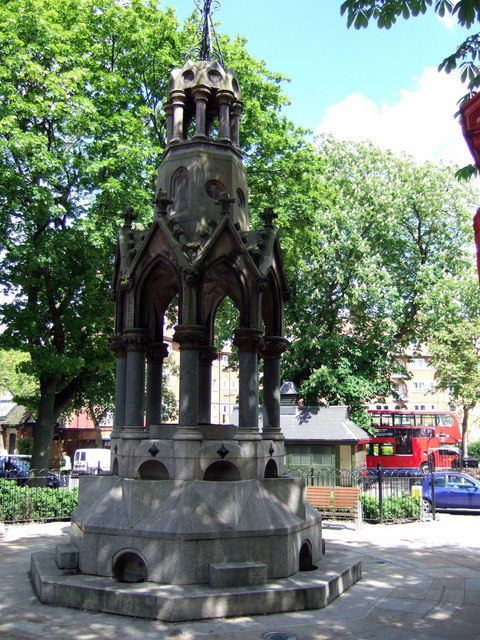
The drinking fountain on South End Green.

South End Road is located in Hampstead in the London Borough of Camden. It takes its name from the old "South End" of Hampstead. It runs southwards from the junction with East Heath Road and Downshire Hill alongside the southern edge of Hampstead Heath until reaching South End Green where it meets Pond Street and two roads running off east towards Gospel Oak. South Hill Park street runs north towards Hampstead Ponds. Keats Grove runs off the road and forms a triangle with Downshire Hill noted for its surviving Regency architecture.

In 1860 Hampstead Heath station on the North London Line was opened on the street providing a connection to the City of London for commuters. The parade of shops was constructed in 1898 and known as Station Parade. Notable residents of the street have included Annie Miller, the former artist's model associated with the Pre-Raphaelite Brotherhood and the architect and Mayor of Hampstead Oswald Milne. Numbers 71 and 73 are now Grade II listed.

== See also ==
- North End Way and West End Lane both similarly take their names from hamlets on the boundaries of Hampstead

== Bibliography ==
- Bebbington, Gillian. London Street Names. Batsford, 1972.
- Cherry, Bridget & Pevsner, Nikolaus. London 4: North. Yale University Press, 2002.
- Wade, Christopher. The Streets of Hampstead. Camden History Society, 2000.
