= Hampstead Heath Ponds =

Artificial lake in London, England

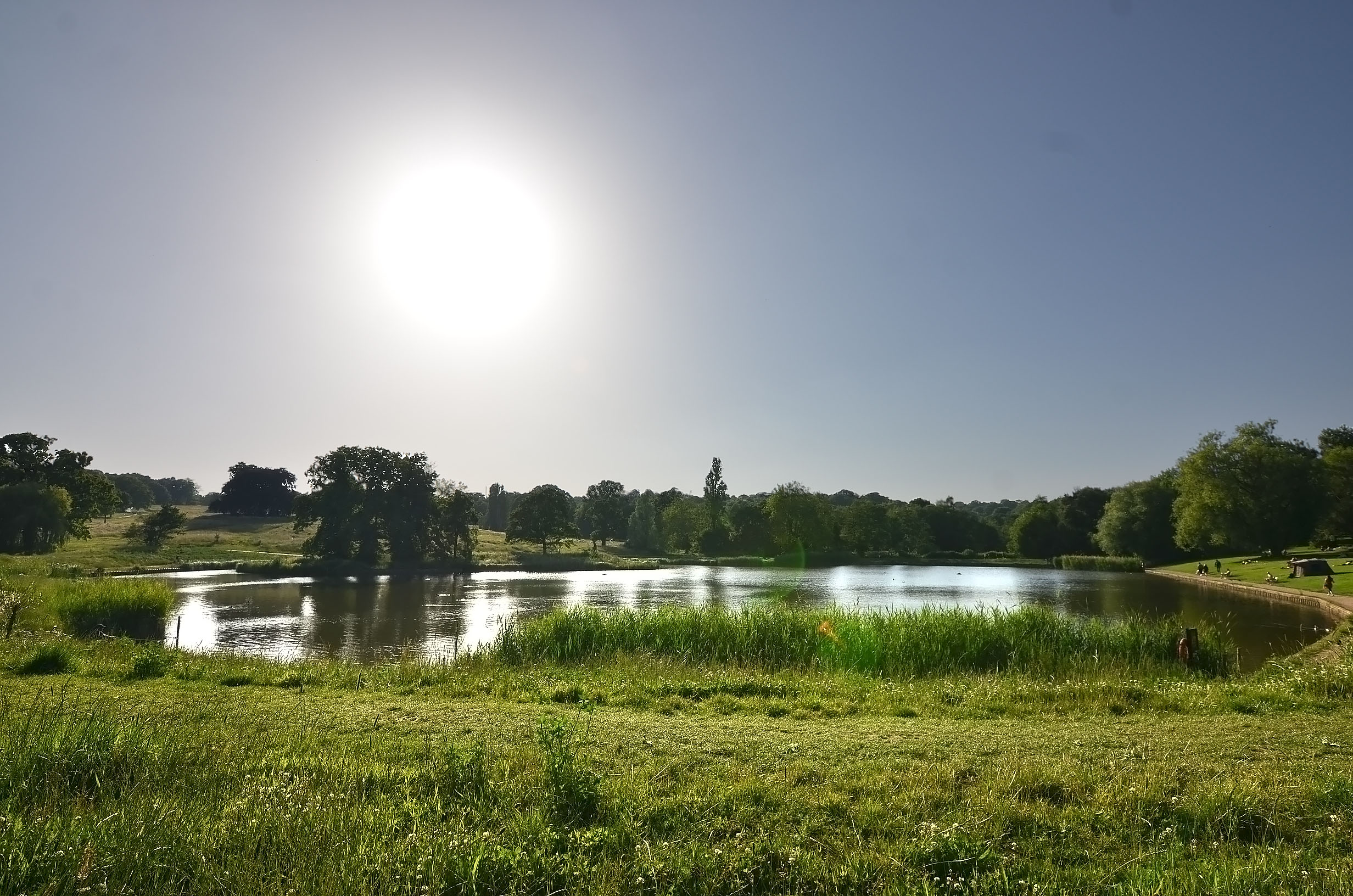
- Hampstead Heath's Model Boating Pond (Highgate Pond no. 3).

- Location within Greater London
- Location: London, England
- Coordinates: 51°33′51″N 0°9′24″W
- Type: Artificial lake/Reservoir, created 1777
- Primary inflows: River Fleet
- Primary outflows: Storm Relief Sewer
- Basin countries: England
- Surface area: 17.3 ha (43 acres)
- Max. depth: Varies by pond
- Water volume: Varies by pond
- Islands: 2 (within the 11 main ponds)

Hampstead Heath Ponds are a series of some thirty bodies of water on or adjacent to Hampstead Heath, a vast open area of woodland and grassland in north London.

The main ponds were originally dug in the 17th and 18th centuries as reservoirs to meet London's growing water demand. These are divided into two groups: the three Hampstead Ponds (West Heath Side) and the eight Highgate Ponds (East Heath Side). Both sets of ponds are officially numbered incrementally from South to North, the southernmost pond being Hampstead no. 1 pond and the northernmost being Highgate no. 8 (Kenwood House's Wood Pond).

The majority of the ponds on Hampstead Heath are fed by the headwater springs of the River Fleet. Three of the main ponds are now large freshwater bathing and swimming ponds: two designated for a single gender (Highgate no. 2 for men and Highgate no. 5 for women); and one for mixed bathing (Hampstead no. 3). The bathing ponds are not the only special-use ponds, however: Highgate no. 3 pond is the Model Boating Pond and it, along with a few other ponds, are open to anglers. A number of the other ponds are set aside as wildlife reserves or are purely ornamental (such as the more minor Viaduct Pond). The City of London Corporation planned to close the bathing ponds in 2004, but a challenge at the High Court by swimmers overcame this, though charges for swimming were introduced.

== Hampstead ponds ==
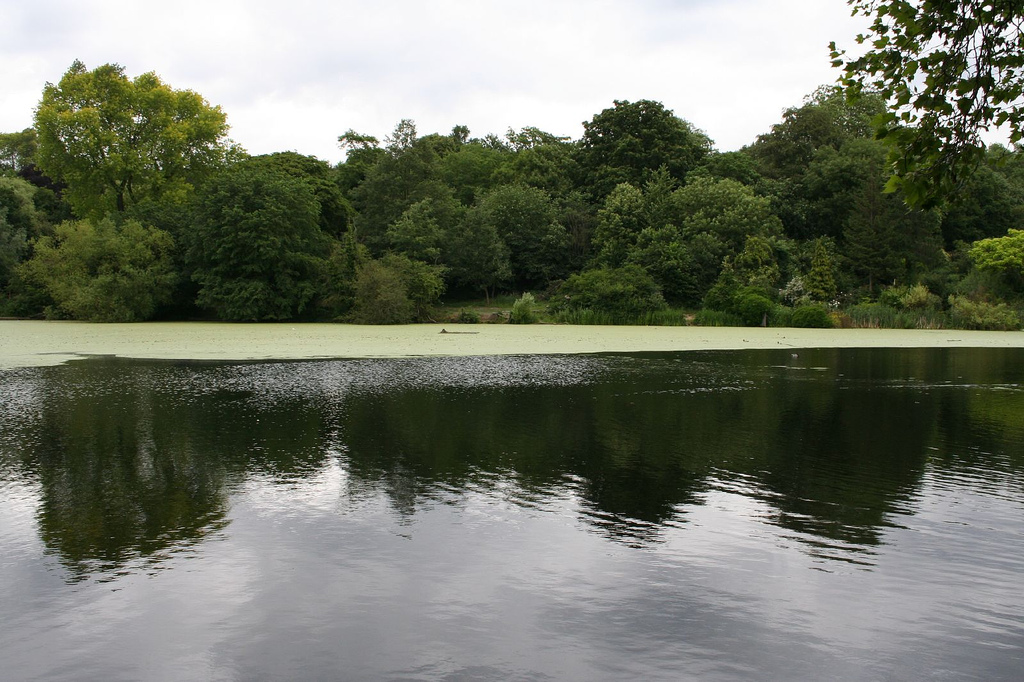
Hampstead Pond no. 1, Southernmost western pond on the Heath.

The Hampstead Ponds consist of three ponds on the Heath's southwest corner, towards South End Green.

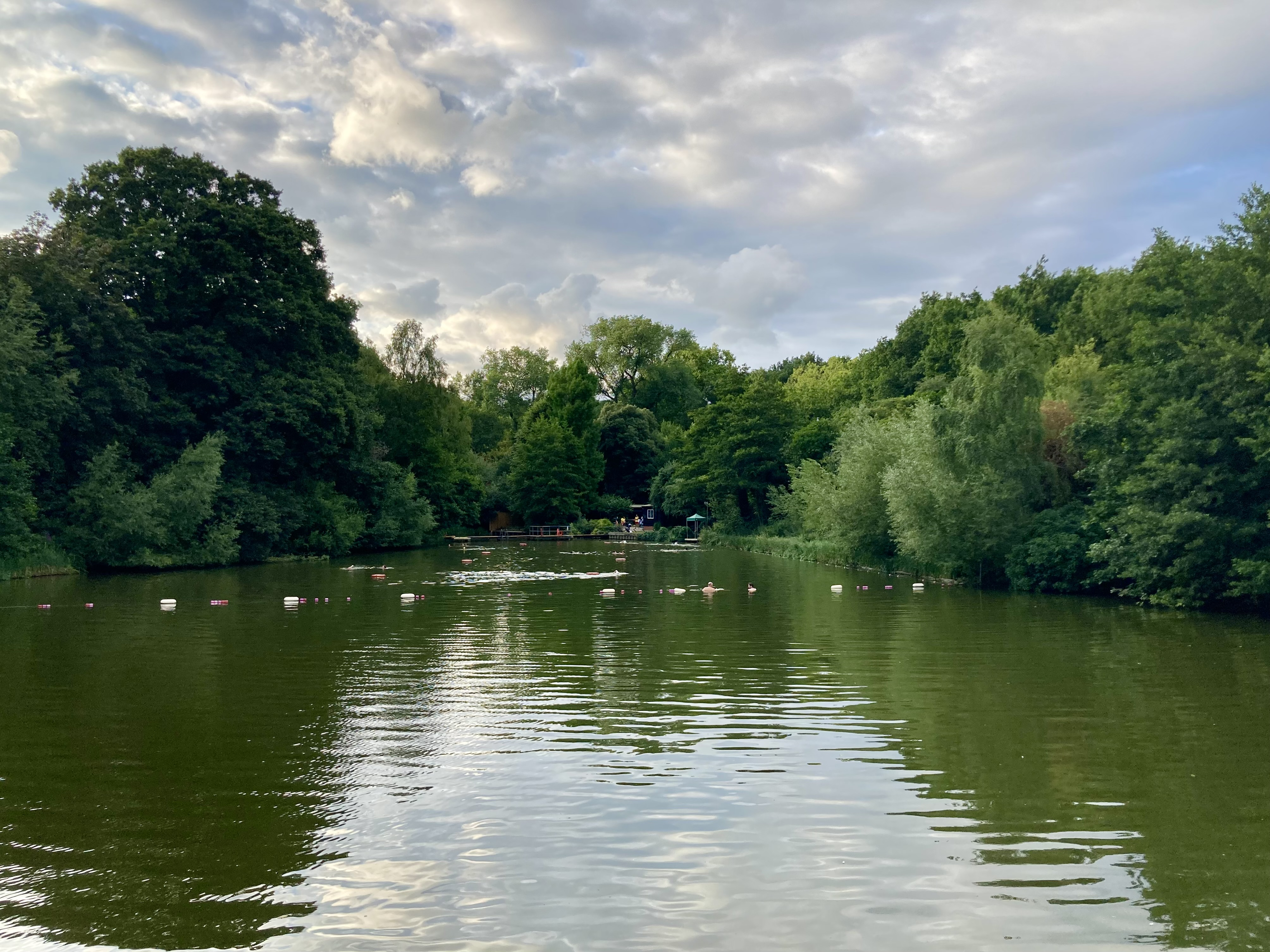
Hampstead Heath mixed bathing pond

Hampstead Pond no. 3 is the mixed bathing pond, where all genders may swim (angling prohibited).

Hampstead ponds no. 1 is strictly a nature and wildlife pond and Hampstead pond no. 2 permits angling.

Directly northwest of the mixed bathing pond is the "Viaduct Pond" and west of that is the Vale of Health pond; these are arguably within the flow of the "Hampstead ponds", but are not officially members of the group.

== Highgate ponds ==
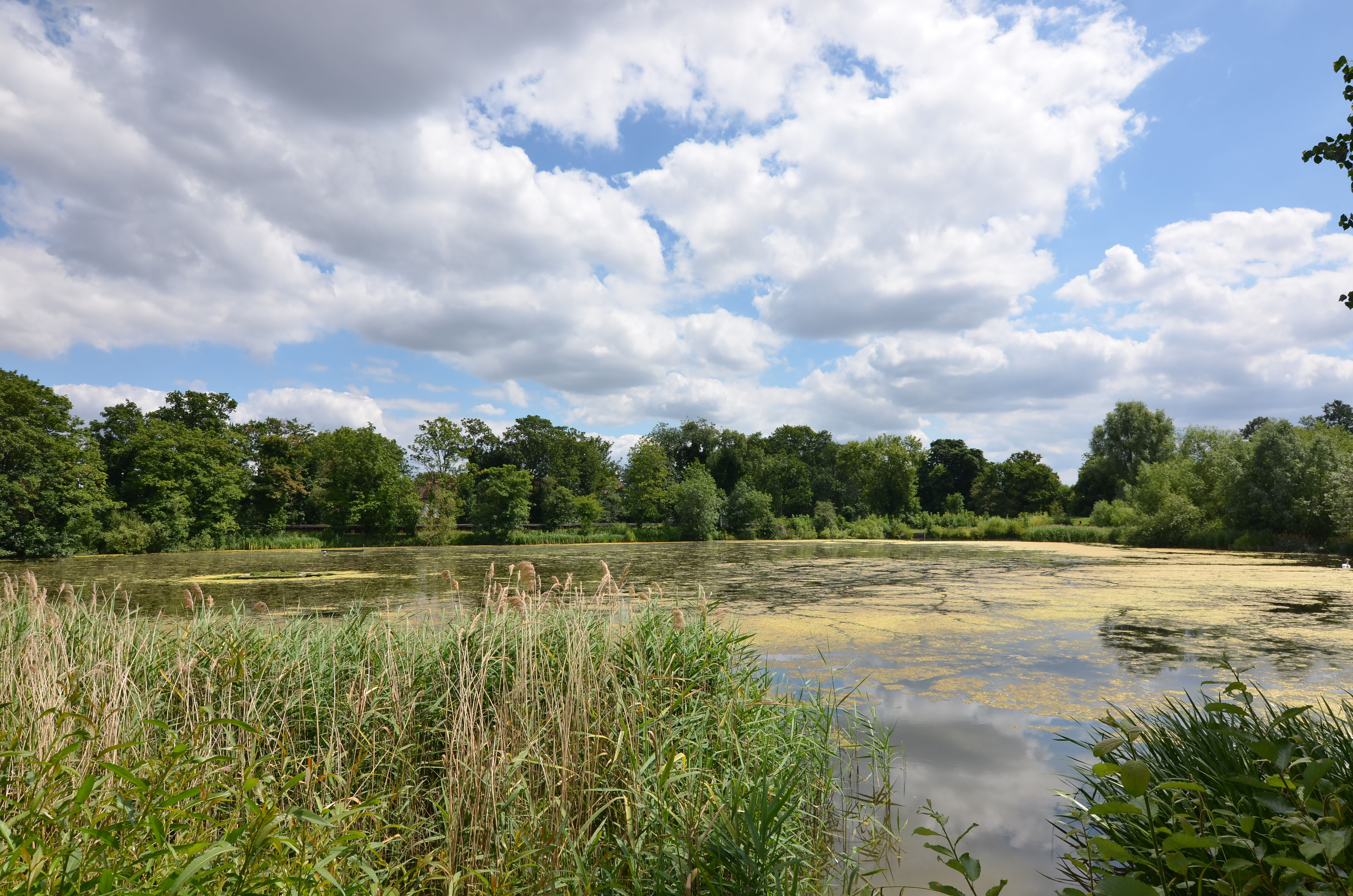
Highgate no. 1 pond is a nature reserve pond on Hampstead Heath.

Highgate Ponds are a series of eight former reservoirs, on the heath's east (Highgate) side, and were originally dug in the 17th and 18th centuries. They include two single-gender swimming pools (the men's and women's bathing ponds), a model boating pond, and two ponds which serve as wildlife reserves: the Stock Pond and the Bird Sanctuary Pond. Angling is allowed in some of the ponds, although this may be threatened by proposals to modify the dams. The ponds are the result of the 1777 damming of Hampstead Brook (one of the Fleet River's sources), by the Hampstead Water Company, which was formed in 1692 to meet London's growing water demands.

"Boudicca's Mound", near the present men's bathing pond, is a tumulus where, according to local legend, Queen Boudicca (Boadicea) was buried after she and 10,000 Iceni warriors were defeated at Battle Bridge. However, historical drawings and paintings of the area show no mound other than a 17th-century windmill.

== Swimming ponds ==
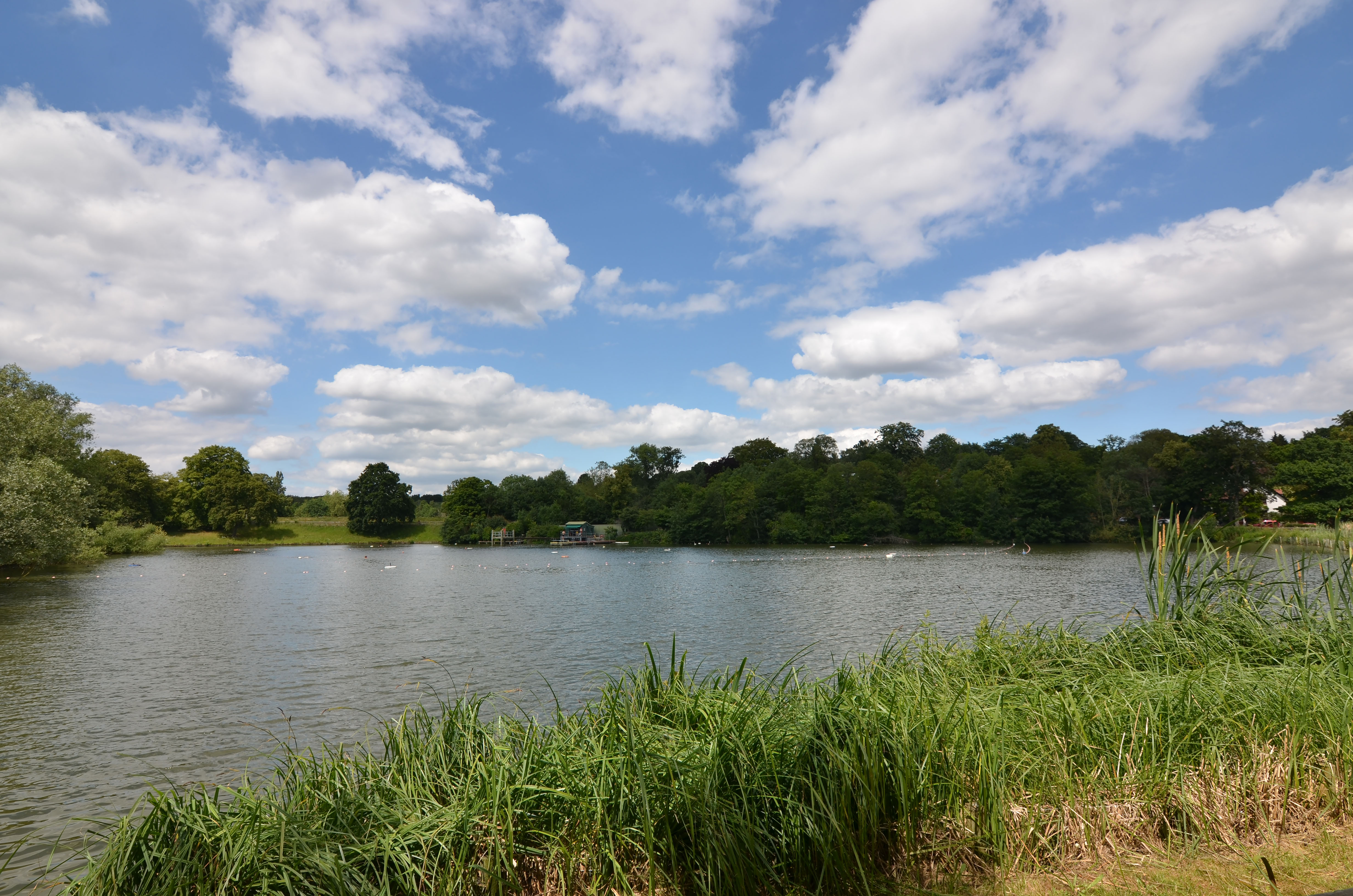
Hampstead Heath's Men's bathing pond (Highgate no. 2 pond), facing North.

Hampstead has three different ponds for swimming: one for men, one for women and one mixed. Only swimmers over eight years of age are allowed; those between eight and 15 years old must be in the care of an adult. The Men's and Ladies' ponds are open for swimming year round, and the mixed between April and October, they are popular with users.

The men's pond had a diving tower, but this was dismantled following an accident in the 1970s and only a low level board remains, along with showers and a small sunbathing and changing area.

Quality of water tests – which comply with EU regulations – are routinely performed on all three swimming ponds. The three ponds are not to be confused with Parliament Hill Lido, built in 1938, now with a stainless steel lining.

In 2004, the City of London Corporation, which holds the Heath in trust since the abolition of the Greater London Council in 1986, tried to close the bathing ponds on the grounds that they were an unsustainable drain on their expenses and posed a health risk to swimmers. Swimmers challenged this and won a victory in the High Court. To defray costs, the Corporation introduced a charge for admission of £4.50 per session, £2.70 for concessions. There was some opposition to this on the grounds that swimming there had been free since at least the 1920s, and some ticket machines were vandalised.

Famous people who have enjoyed swimming in the Hampstead ponds include novelist Esther Freud, politician Ed Miliband, journalist Dolly Alderton, actors Emma Corrin, Benedict Cumberbatch, Woody Harrelson and Sascha Baron Cohen, singer Harry Styles and presenter Dermot O'Leary. A collection of 14 reflections by contemporary writers on swimming in the Ladies' Pond was published in 2019 and includes contributions from Ava Wong Davies, Margaret Drabble, and Deborah Moggach.

== 2011 work on dams ==
In 2011, it was announced that the City of London was proposing extensive works on the ponds and dams, which it stated were necessary for safety reasons in the event of a rare major storm. The proposals included measures to improve the water quality of the ponds as well as improvements to the pipes and weirs that allow water to cascade from one pond to the other. These initial recommendations followed engineers' reports in 2005 that the hydrology of the ponds was poorly understood. These same engineering reports resulted in engineering works in 2006 on the two ponds in the grounds of Kenwood House, to make their overflow structures and dams safer. There was strong opposition from the swimming clubs and the Protect Our Ponds campaign. In 2013 a united campaign was launched called Dam Nonsense to oppose the works, which the campaign claimed unnecessary and in conflict with the Hampstead Heath Act 1871.. The campaign included all the groups opposed to the proposals. The work on the Hampstead Heath dams was further complicated by the regulations embodied in the 1975 Reservoir Act, which only relate to three dams on the Heath, and the regulations under the Flood and Water Management Act 2010 which potentially relate to all 14 dams on the Heath. The Heath and Hampstead Society took the engineering decisions of the City of London to judicial review in November 2014: the interpretation of the 1975 Reservoir Act was challenged and thereby the nature of the proposed engineering works to the dams. The case was heard by The Honourable Mrs Justice Lang (DBE) and a ruling, in favour of the City of London, was issued on 28 November 2014 (case number CO/4175/2014). The judgement also addressed the status of the proposed engineering works relative to the provisions of the 1871 Act, again ruling that the engineers had shown due consideration for the provisions of the Act..

The work went ahead and raised the height of the dams, in the case of the dam above the Men's Swimming Pond by 18 feet. The City of London Corporation said the work should be carried out urgently to reduce danger of flooding in surrounding built-up residential areas in the event of one of the dams bursting.. The initial estimate of the number of lives which might be lost, in the event of a dam collapse in an extreme flood event, was over 2000 (2006 estimate). This figure has been reduced to less than 400, still a large number. However the chance of such an event is one in 400,000 years.

The regulated dams under the 1975 Reservoir Act are the Model Pond and the Men's Bathing Pond in the Highgate Chain. Highgate Number 1 pond would have been covered by the Act but the water level was lowered by the GLC in 1984. In the Hampstead chain, Hampstead Number 1 pond is also regulated under the 1975 Act.

== Location ==
The men's and women's ponds are on the eastern side of the park, off Millfield Lane. The mixed bathing pond is towards the centre of the Heath, and is a 10–15 minute walk from Hampstead Heath railway station and from South End Green, which is served by several bus routes.

== LGBT+ community ==
In the 1980s, Highgate Men's Pond was known as a spot where gay men from London gathered to socialize and cruise for sex. George Michael visited the ponds in search of sex and told The Guardian: "It's a much nicer place to get some quick and honest sex than standing in a bar, E'd off your tits (high on ecstasy) shouting at somebody and hoping they want the same thing as you do in bed." In the 90s, police patrolled the surrounding woods to try and stop men from having sex there.

Attempts by the government to restrict access to the ponds has continued intermittently to the present day, with protests erupting in 2020 over City of London Corporation introducing charges for swimming at the (previously free) beach as well as mandatory booking in advance. In 2020, police used COVID-19 restrictions to fine several gay men for cruising in the woods.

In December 2017, the City of London corporation confirmed that transgender women are allowed to use the women's pool per the Equality Act 2010. Confirmation of this policy took place after a poll showed that 60% of locals strongly agreed with trans inclusion. In March 2024, during an annual meeting, the Kenwood Ladies' Pond Association voted against a motion which would have redefined the word women to refer to only those assigned female at birth. KLPA lacks the authority to amend pond bylaws but its deliberations might sway the City Corporation.

On 30 September 2025, the City of London Corporation announced it would be reviewing its policy of access to the Kenwood Ladies' Pond and Highgate Men's Pond by transgender individuals in light of an April ruling by the Supreme Court, which clarified the terms "man" and "woman" to refer to "biological sex" under the Equality Act. The ruling also affirmed protection against unlawful discrimination and harassment for transgender individuals. Six options: single-sex facilities based on biological sex, trans-inclusive based on gender lived as, trans-inclusive as currently operated (transgender individuals choose which facility they use), pools to be trans-inclusive but changing and bathroom facilities to not, hybrid with times designated for single-sex and others to be trans-inclusive, and all spaces becoming mixed-sex, were presented for public comment which ended 25 November. An independent analysis of the 32,315 comments received was promised, with a full report to be published "in due course". The present policy remains in effect in the interim.

On the 29th of January 2026, the City of London Corporation published the results of the consultation. 86% of people responded that trans people should be allowed to use the pond that aligns with their gender identity (trans men in the men's and trans women in the women’s pond) On the same day, Sex Matters had their judicial review against the CoLC refused. Mrs Justice Lieven said the "appropriate forum" for the claim is the county court rather than the High Court.
