= Sir Richard Steele (public house) =

Pub in Haverstock Hill, London, England

Coordinates: 51.54685°N 0.1589°W

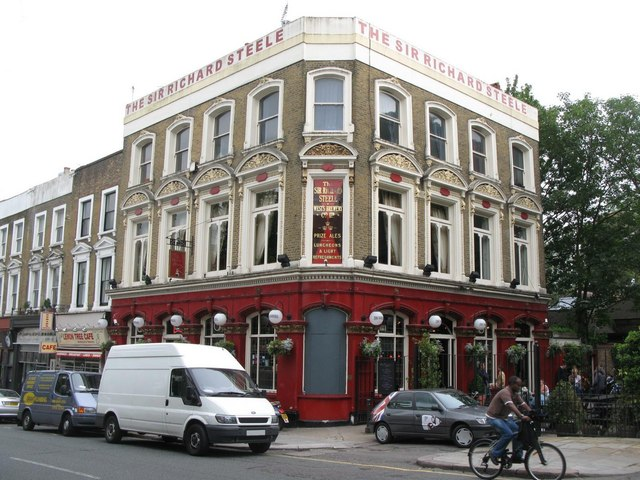
The Sir Richard Steele

The Sir Richard Steele is a public house in Haverstock Hill, north London, midway between Belsize Park and Chalk Farm tube stations on the Northern line. It is named after Richard Steele (1672–1729). It has been designated as an asset of community value.
