= Long Live Southbank =

Preservation campaign

Coordinates: 51.5068°N 0.1165°W

- Founded: April 2013
- Type: NGO
- Registration no.: England & Wales (08487222)
- Location: London
- Origins: London, England (UK)
- Region served: Worldwide
- Members: 150,000
- Website: llsb.netlify.app

Long Live Southbank, commonly known as LLSB, is a non-profit organisation that successfully campaigned against the redevelopment of the Southbank Undercroft skateboarding spot at the Southbank Centre site in London, England. The organisation is now campaigning to safeguard the space and help the community continue to evolve creatively.

The movement was established in April 2013 in order to safeguard the historic site in British skateboarding following the publication of the Festival Wing plans by the Southbank Centre released on 6 March 2013. This proposed scheme included two new buildings above and alongside the Queen Elizabeth Hall to be funded to a significant degree by commercial restaurant and retail developments in the Undercroft space which would have been closed to its skateboarding and other current users. Although an alternative location for skateboarding and other activities was proposed by Southbank Centre, under Hungerford Bridge, this was considered by users of the Undercroft to be a quite different space and lack the unique character and heritage of the Undercroft. On 18 September 2014, Long Live Southbank signed a Section 106 agreement with the Southbank Centre guaranteeing the space's long-term future. and the Festival Wing proposals were withdrawn by Southbank Centre.

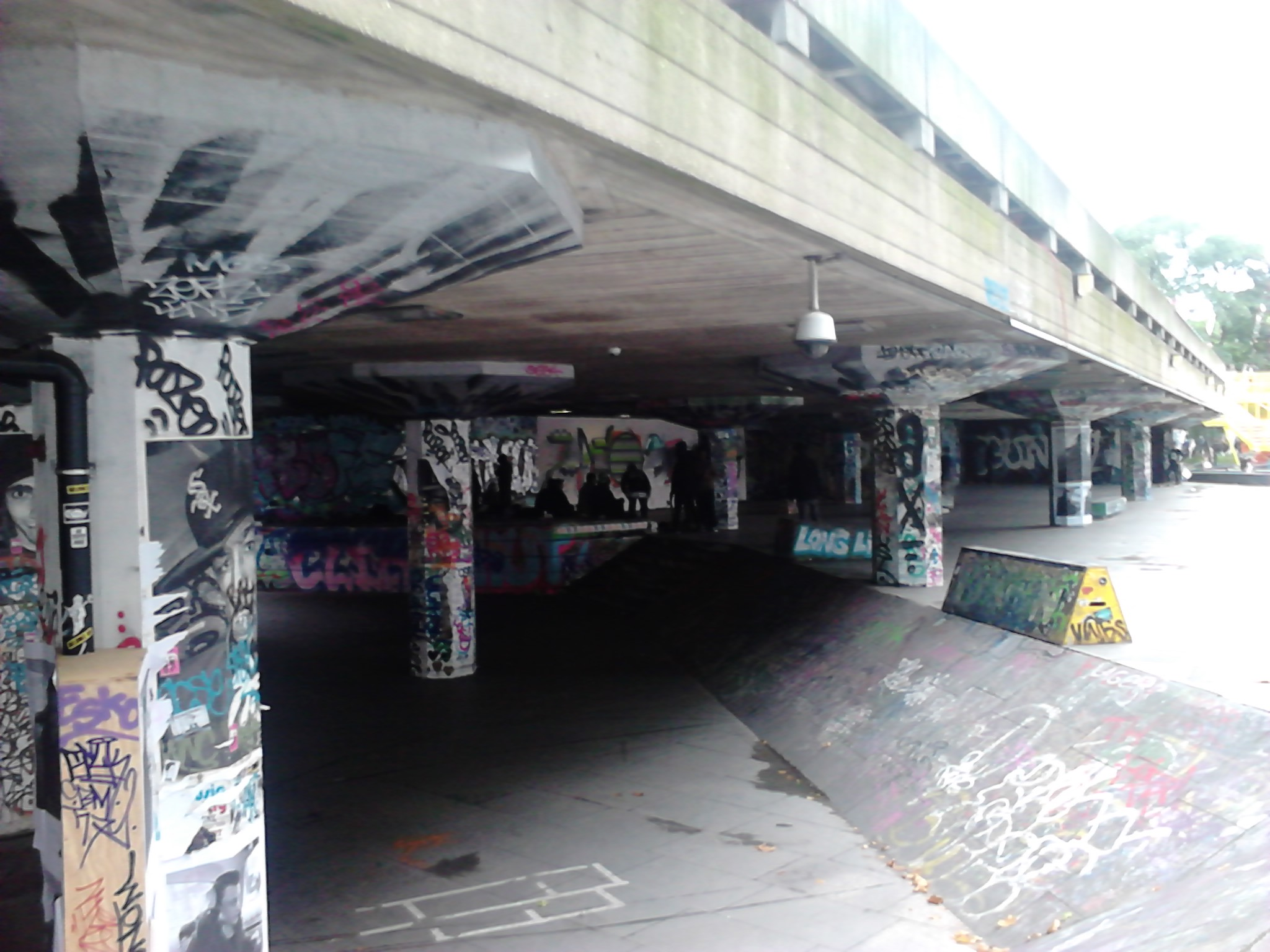
The Southbank Undercroft

The area has been continually used by skateboarders, BMXers and other creative urban art forms since the early seventies and remains an important landmark for urban culture. The campaign seeks to protect a dynamic space that has been utilised for creativity and self-expression for decades, independently building a culture and community that continues to attract visitors from all over the world.

LLSB volunteer, Henry Edwards-Wood, says of the motivation for the campaign; "This space has empowered generations of physical, visual and collaborative expression and informed and directed the lives of people from all walks of life. This world famous landmark and cultural icon must be preserved for future generations to flourish."

== History ==
The Undercroft skateboarding area was an unused space appropriated as a cultural and recreational facility within the South Bank complex that has been used consistently for over 40 years. Skateboarders initially appropriated the area but it soon became used by BMXers, inline skaters, graffiti artists and many other creatives including street dancers, musicians, videographers and more.

The space is unique as it grew organically into what is now widely recognised as the home of British skateboarding. As an import from California, skateboarding in Britain was difficult due to the weather. The Undercroft space provided the perfect environment for skating as it was covered from the rain, smooth, flat with unusual architectural features resembling the ramps Californians skated, but most importantly disused.

In London, the concrete banks below the Southbank Centre's Hayward Gallery proved ideal for early surf-related moves,

A large paved area sweeps into a three-sided bank and a seemingly endless stream of kids
were hurtling up to the bank, riding it, and turning back down and away...others were riding
along the top edge of the bank, crouched down holding on to their boards (‘carving’)."

In late 2003 the Southbank Centre reduced the skate area by two thirds without consulting any users of the undercroft space and destroyed the small banks and driveway ramp that was in that area, this area was then used as extra storage space.

In August 2004 Rich "Badger" Holland of Side Effects of Urethane designed and installed new pieces of street furniture into the Undercroft space This project was entitled 'Moving Units', later in 2006 more stone street furniture was provided as part of another project by the TSEOU entitled Units Moved. Finally, in 2010 a railing was placed around the site and this now serves as a vantage point for spectators.

Since April 2013 the LLSB campaign has been working to protect the legal status of the Undercroft. LLSB's application for the area to be awarded the status of an Asset of Community Value was granted in July 2013. An application, now withdrawn as part of the Section 106 agreement, has also been lodged for the area to be granted village green status under the Commons Act 2006 as an area of recognised community value that is regularly enjoyed by local residents. The Southbank Centre released a response to the decision to list the Undercroft as an 'Asset of Community Value' advising that they have no intention of selling the space and the outcome makes no difference to their intended development.

== Reception to the Festival Wing scheme of 2013-14 ==
The campaign increased the awareness of the Southbank Centre's Festival Wing redevelopment proposals and established a growing support base of those opposed to it.

=== English Heritage ===
English Heritage originally welcomed the Festival Wing proposals, believing that it would provide "new facilities and opportunities for the Southbank Centre to cement its position as the leading arts complex in Britain". However, their concerns about the scale of the development plans led Simon Hickman, English Heritage's Inspector of Historic Buildings and Areas, to submit a letter to Lambeth council on 5 July. He advised that English Heritage was aware of the "volume of representations from the skateboard community in regards to this application, who value the Undercroft and feel it is part of their cultural identity". He added that, "as it is their primary role to assess the physical effects of proposed development on a historic environment, further analysis was needed to find out the communal value of the Undercroft is necessary to ascertain the impact on recent cultural heritage". In September 2013 English Heritage published the following statement on its website. "In 2012 the Department for Culture, Media and Sport granted the Southbank Centre a Certificate of Immunity from listing. This Certificate is valid for five years and during this period the building cannot be considered for listing. The decision cannot be challenged until this time has elapsed which, in this case, means June 2017. We appreciate the community value of the skate park and welcome the Southbank Centre’s commitment to providing a new one not far from the present location."

=== Kate Hoey, MP ===
Kate Hoey, MP for Vauxhall, was initially in favour of the development and was quoted in the March press release as saying "Southbank Centre has played a leading role in helping to transform the Southbank into London's top destination and this project will make the South Bank one of the world's most vibrant areas". Kate Hoey has since become an active MP in the movement against the plans. On 27 June Hoey presented the 40,000-signature petition (which was later replaced by a preservation statement with 150,000 signatures) to save the Southbank skate area to the House of Commons. She spoke to the House and advised that the Undercroft is a ‘culturally and historically important area of the South Bank’. Hoey has also become active on her Twitter site in support of the campaign.

=== The Twentieth Century Society ===
The Twentieth Century Society initially welcomed the development and was pleased by the Southbank Centre's enthusiasm for redevelopment of the existing buildings. However, they felt frustrated that neither Southbank Centre nor their architects addressed the society's concerns regarding the size of the building in the pre-application meetings.

Director Catherine Croft wrote that the Twentieth Century Society were "deeply disappointed" that they cannot support the Southbank Centre's scheme. The organisation feels that the proposals are "too big and over ambitious" and will dwarf the neighbouring National Theatre’s Howarth Tomkins scheme. Furthermore, the society recognise the "immense interest and opposition" that has been generated by the plans to relocate the skateboarders. They feel that the skateboarders "bring a unique visual and cultural interest" to the South Bank and feel that the Southbank Centre has not "fully appreciated" the "communal value".

=== Commission for Architecture and the Built Environment ===
Paul Finch, Chair of Design Council CABE, is quoted in the Southbank Centre's initial press release as being in favour of the development as the design "respects and upgrades the past while introducing bold additions, which will be unmistakably of their time".

Later they released a review that argued that the "complex and challenging proposal would benefit from an extended pre-planning phase" as the proposal should reflect the "aspirations and aesthetic tendencies of our time".

=== Lambeth Council ===
Lambeth Council received the planning application from the Southbank Centre in May 2013 and due to the high level of interest in the development set up a page on their website with the aim to clarify "the facts" of the proposals. The page informs that the plans will double the size of the arts centre and will include new rehearsal space, educational facilities, restaurants and shops and includes that these retail spaces will be situated in "the 'Undercroft', part of which is currently the home of the skate park".

The council recognised that the space is being used by skaters, BMXers and graffiti artists and "is renowned internationally by the skateboard community. It is a 'destination' on the South Bank." The page also states that these plans are proposals that will be confirmed by themselves as a local planning authority, "subject to a final direction from the Mayor of London. The plans are not proposed by Lambeth council but the Southbank Centre".

Councillor Lib Peck, head of Lambeth Council, is quoted, "The Southbank Centre is an important asset to the borough, and the skate park has become an established part of it. Although there is already a commitment from Southbank Centre that skateboarding will be kept on the South Bank, we would like to see further discussions take place and are confident that a satisfactory solution can be found." The website advises that Lambeth Council and the Southbank Centre agreed to extend the deadline for a decision on the planning application in order to allow discussions to take place.

The Section 106 settlement between the Southbank Centre and Long Live Southbank, guaranteeing the long-term future of the Undercroft will be upheld by Lambeth Council. Cllr Lib Peck, Leader of Lambeth Council said; "I'm pleased that Lambeth Council was able to work with both sides and find an imaginative solution to resolve this. Shared public space in London is precious and Southbank Centre is a great asset to the country’s cultural life. This agreement is a sensible way of protecting both and we can all now look forward."

== Success ==
Lambeth Council accepted LLSB's application for the Southbank Undercroft to be listed as an "Asset of Community Value" under the Localism Act 2011 on 12 July 2013.

In January 2014, the last of 33,000 planning permission objections (distinct from the 150,000 statements of support gathered by LLSB) were delivered to Lambeth Council. This included a formal objection written by Nick Hytner, the artistic director of the National Theatre, which was published on the Southbank Centre's planning application on Lambeth Council's website. The Twentieth Century Society released information advising that they are no longer in support of the plans. In September 2013 English Heritage issued a statement in support of Southbank Centre's plans.

On 16 January 2014, the Mayor of London, Boris Johnson came out in support of Long Live Southbank. This was highly significant as he had power of veto over any planning application in London. The Mayor said "The skate park is the epicentre of UK skateboarding and is part of the cultural fabric of London. This much-loved community space has been used by thousands of young people over the years. It attracts tourists from across the world and undoubtedly adds to the vibrancy of the area – it helps to make London the great city it is" This forced the Southbank Centre to drop their planning application for a period of reconsideration.

After months of negotiations, the Southbank Centre and Long Live Southbank signed a binding deal with Lambeth Council to guarantee the long-term future of the skate spot on 18 September 2014. The joint press release said "Following talks that have taken place over the last three months, Long Live Southbank and Southbank Centre are delighted to have reached an agreement that secures the Queen Elizabeth Hall undercroft as the long-term home of British skateboarding and the other urban activities for which it is famous."

== LLSB community work ==
Since the September 2014 agreement with the Southbank Centre, Long Live Southbank have remained a highly active organisation. They have worked with a wide variety of groups aiming to protect creative spaces and communities, both in the UK and abroad. Most significant is the assistance provided to the skateboarding communities of Norwich and Kettering in England, as well as the Friends of Stockwell campaign, who are aiming to safeguard Stockwell Skatepark, also in South London.

Long Live Southbank continue to be involved in resolving ongoing issues at the Undercroft, organizing maintenance, resolving disputes and taking part in talks and workshops to raise awareness about the importance of free creative spaces.

== LLSB restoration campaign 2017 onward ==
In June 2017 Southbank Centre and Long Live Southbank (LLSB) launched a £790,000 joint crowdfunding campaign to raise funds to restore the skate space.

The development will include new space for skateboarding, graffiti and other free creative pursuits. Also included is a new space for children and young people to engage activities, organised by Southbank Centre.

The development will extend the existing skate space, with improvements to lighting as well as a restoration of original 1960s banks and concrete paving. It will also create a new learning and education hub for children and young people, a go-to place for young people looking for opportunities in the arts and creative industries. This hub will host interactive new learning and participation events and programmes that will welcome hundreds of school-children and local people to creative projects every day.
