= Neighbourhood forum =

Neighbourhood forums are a construct of local governments in England and are defined in the Town and Country Planning Act 1990 as a body that organises the production of a neighbourhood plan.

Where town or parish councils exist those bodies may apply to the local planning authority (usually a district or borough council) for the devolution of neighbourhood planning powers. Where an area is unparished (usually because it is within a city or urban area) then local people may seek to create a neighbourhood forum and then apply to the local planning authority for its formal designation.

A designated neighbourhood forum is an organisation empowered by local planning authority to lead the neighbourhood planning process in the absence of a town or parish council.
