= Hampstead Heath railway station =

London Overground station in the London Borough of Camden

Hampstead Heath
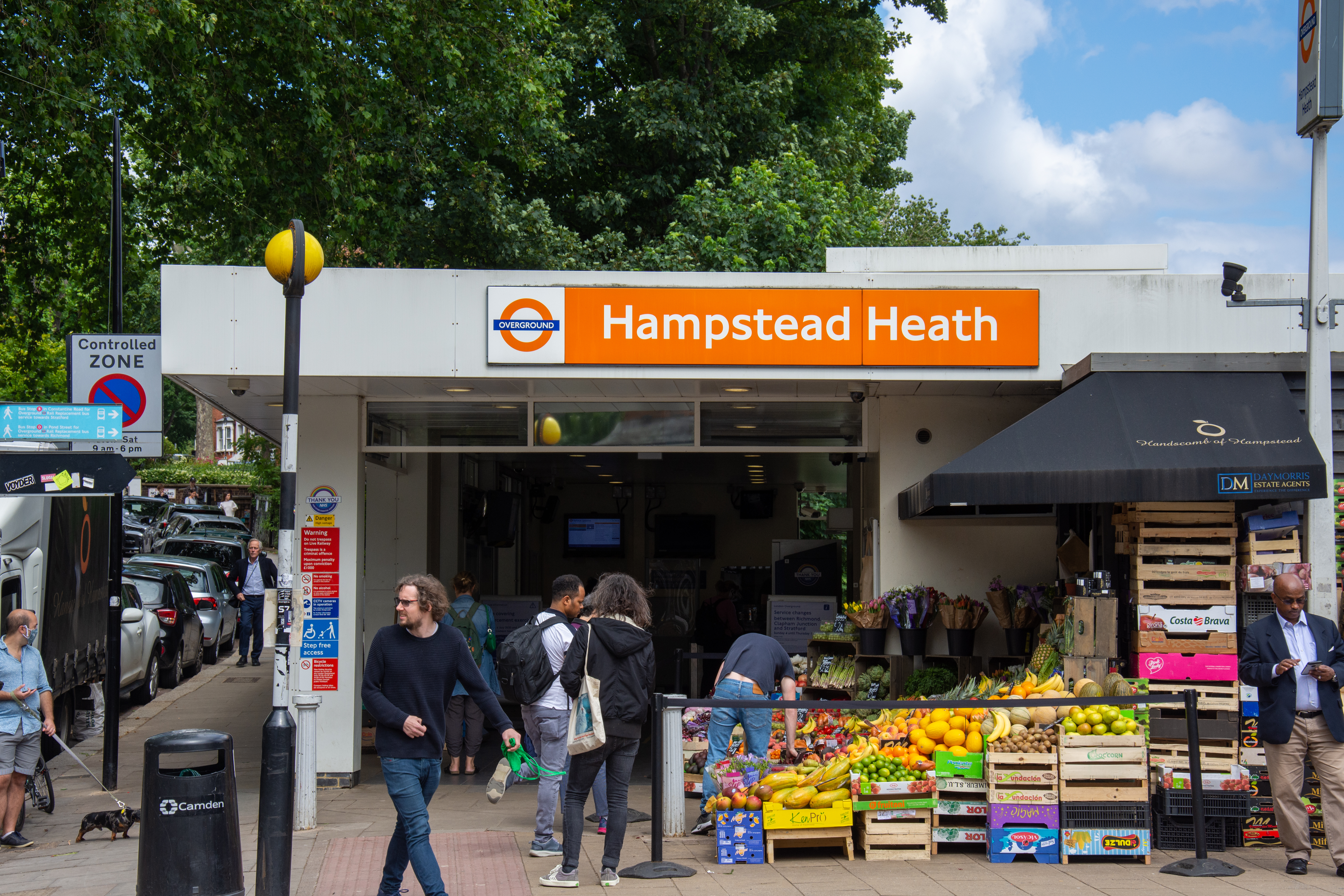
- Interactive map of Hampstead Heath

General information
- Location: Hampstead
- Local authority: London Borough of Camden
- Managed by: London Overground
- Owner: Network Rail
- Station code: HDH
- DfT category: D
- Number of platforms: 2
- Accessible: Yes
- Fare zone: 2

National Rail annual entry and exit
- 2020–21: ▼1.647 million
- 2021–22: ▲2.587 million
- 2022–23: ▲2.972 million
- 2023–24: ▲3.325 million
- 2024–25: ▲3.512 million

Key dates
- 2 January 1860: Opened

Other information
- External links: Departures; Facilities
- Coordinates: 51.5553°N 0.1654°W

Hampstead Heath is a station on the Mildmay line of the London Overground, located on South End Road in Hampstead in the London Borough of Camden. Situated between Finchley Road & Frognal and Gospel Oak stations, the station is in London fare zone 2.

== History ==
In the nineteenth century up to 100,000 people per day used the station at weekends and on public holidays as the Heath was a popular leisure destination for Londoners. The station was rebuilt, after Second World War bomb damage, and in the 1990s in conjunction with works to allow Eurostar trains to use the North London line.

== Design ==
The platform canopies are in a pseudo-antique style which is in stark contrast to the poured concrete style of the rest of the station's structural features. The line runs below street level with access via staircases to each platform. Lifts providing access to both platforms were added in 2014. During the same refurbishment works new ticket barriers were added.

== Artwork ==
In 2011, Evenings' Hill by British artist Clare Woods was installed along the length of the platform, made from porcelain tiles. The artwork was commissioned by TfL in 2011, as part of London Overground's art programme.

== Services ==
All services at Hampsted Heath are operated by London Overground as part of the Mildmay line using Class 378 EMUs.

The typical off-peak service in trains per hour is:

- 8 tph to Stratford via Camden Road
- 4 tph to Richmond
- 4 tph to Clapham Junction

During the late evenings, the services to and from Clapham Junction do not operate.

Preceding station	London Overground	Following station
Finchley Road & Frognal towards Clapham Junction or Richmond	Mildmay line North London line	Gospel Oak towards Stratford

== Connections ==
London Buses routes 1, 24, 46 and C11 serve the station.
