= Asset of community value =

Legal designation of land or property in England that protects it from development

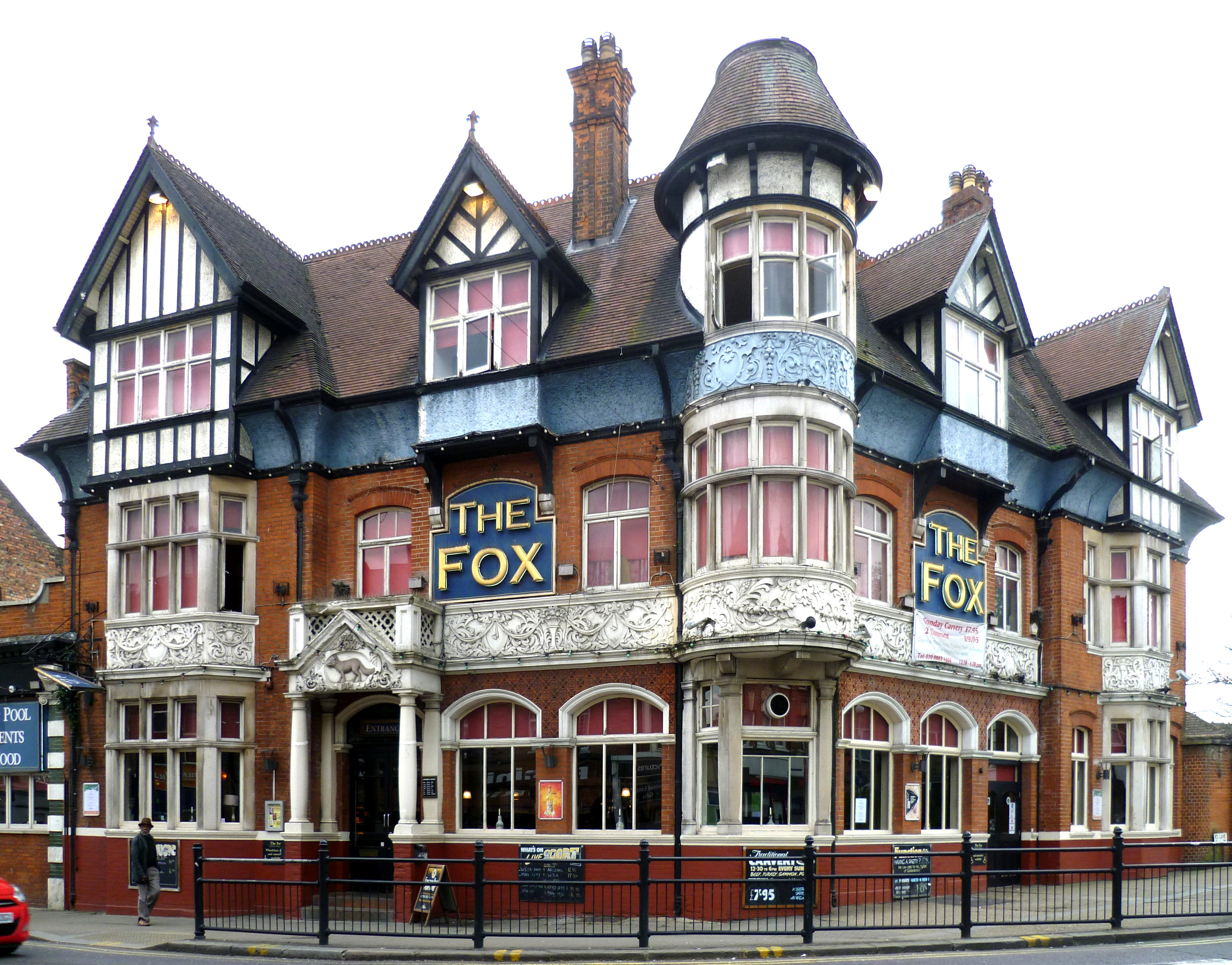
The Fox public house in Palmers Green became the first ACV in the London Borough of Enfield in 2015.

In England, an asset of community value (ACV) is land or property of importance to a local community which is subject to additional protection from development under the Localism Act 2011. Voluntary and community organisations, parish councils, local neighbourhood planning forums and charities can nominate an asset to be included on their local authority's register of asset of community value.

The initiative is distinct from the community asset transfer procedure, although the two are often conflated.

== Criteria ==
Under the terms of the legislation, registration as an asset of community value covers three aspects:

- Material planning consideration: although not part of the enacted legislation, the ACV status may be a material consideration in a planning application and may be used by the local planning authority and Planning Inspectorate as a factor in refusing planning permission for full or partial change of use or demolition. The government guidance document Community Right to Bid: Non-statutory advice note for local authorities supported by Don Foster MP introduced this right, however under the provision that it is open to the local planning authority to decide whether listing as an asset of community value is a material consideration if an application for change of use is submitted, considering all the circumstances of the case;
- Community right to bid: a moratorium imposes a pause on a sale for up to six months to allow the local community a chance to raise funds and submit an offer to purchase the property. The owner however is under no obligation to accept the offer or for the community to be treated as a preferential bidder;
- Compulsory purchase rights: an ACV-registered building can be compulsorily purchased by the local authority or council "if the asset is under threat of long-term loss to the community".

== Restrictions ==
The owner of an asset of community value must inform the local authority if they wish to sell the asset. If a qualifying community group wants to buy the asset, they can trigger a moratorium for six months, to give them a chance to raise the money to purchase the asset. The owner does not have to sell to a community group. The asset of community value listing only improves the chances of community groups being able to purchase by providing more time to raise funds. It does not require the owner to sell at a discount.

The listing of a property as an asset of community value lasts for five years after which it is automatically delisted and the restrictions imposed by the covenant are removed. Communities can however apply for the listing to be renewed. Care should be taken to ensure the listing is continuous- apply for renewal not less than eight weeks before the original listing ends.

Between 6 March 2015 and 22 May 2017 there was special protection in place protecting ACV listed or nominated pubs from a change of use or demolition under the 'permitted development' rules in the General Permitted Development Order. From 23 May 2017 onwards this protection is extended to all pubs regardless of their ACV status, under the Amendment to the GPDO (SI 2017/619). This means that any change of use or demolition (apart from changing the way a pub operates to include greater dining use, and back again to a solely drinking establishment) now requires full planning permission.

== Numbers ==
By late 2015, of about 860 pubs across the country which had registered as ACVs, twelve had been acquired by groups under the community right to bid and none had been purchased under compulsory purchase powers, although in 2015 there were two cases where the latter was being investigated; as of 2018 there were about six pub CPO actions being considered or underway.

The largest group of listings have been for pubs, with over one hundred listed by August 2013 and six hundred by March 2015. Sport and leisure facilities include Elland Road stadium in Leeds, Ewood Park football stadium in Blackburn, Old Trafford football stadium, St. Andrews football stadium, the Blackpool football stadium at Bloomfield Road, Newbury Football Ground (West Berks), Reading F.C.'s Madejski Stadium, The Valley and the South Bank Undercroft; sports clubs; parks including Myddelton Square in Islington.

== See also ==
- List of assets of community value
