= Minnie's Boys =

Musical play

- Original Cast Recording
- Music: Larry Grossman
- Lyrics: Hal Hackady
- Book: Arthur Marx; Robert Fisher
- Basis: Early years of the Marx Brothers
- Productions: 1970 Broadway; 2008 Off-Broadway

Minnie's Boys is a musical with a book by Arthur Marx (Groucho Marx's son) and Robert Fisher, music by Larry Grossman, and lyrics by Hal Hackady.

It provides a behind-the-scenes look at the early days of the Marx Brothers and their relationship with their mother Minnie Marx, the driving force behind their ultimate success.

== Production ==
=== Development ===
Producer Sol C. Siegel had developed a project based on the young Marx Brothers in the early 1960s with a script written by Julius J. Epstein, but it was never made.

The producer of the Broadway show was Arthur Whitelaw, who had done the musical You're a Good Man, Charlie Brown. Groucho hoped that Neil Simon would write the book but Simon turned down the job; comedian David Steinberg, a great admirer of the Marx Brothers, did it instead. Groucho disliked Steinberg's work and the job was then offered to his son Arthur and Arthur's writing partner Robert Fisher; the duo had just penned a Broadway comedy hit, The Impossible Years. Arthur Marx later wrote he "embarked on the project with great enthusiasm" but later realised "how wise Neil Simon was to have turned down the project."

Arthur Marx and Fisher wrote a first draft for Minnie's Boys in six weeks. Arthur says the problems began when Whitelaw insisted on a non-realistic second act. Then Whitelaw wanted Totie Fields to play Minnie, who Arthur Marx felt was ideal casting, but Groucho refused to give his permission as he felt Fields was "too Jewish". The role eventually went to Shelley Winters. Arthur Marx wrote "My father was delighted to have the two-time Oscar winner in the show. But ironically, Winters ended up looking and sounding more Jewish in the role than ever Totie Fields would have done. " Arthur Marx would comment that Winters "didn't belong in the show at all."

There was a long preview period lasting for sixty-four performances, during which the creators constantly tinkered with the show. The original choreographer, Patricia Birch, was replaced and there were rumors about replacing Shelley Winters. Arthur Marx says his father was a disruptive influence at rehearsals as he kept telling anecdotes about the past and slowing down progress. Arthur Marx also says he persuaded Whitelaw that the second act needed to be rewritten; the producer agreed but the original director did not so the director was fired and replaced with Stanley Prager. Before Arthur Marx and his partner began rewriting the second act they discovered that Whitelaw and Prager had secretly hired Joseph Stein from Fiddler on the Roof to rewrite the second act from their notes. Arthur eventually went along with this. He says Shelley Winters had trouble remembering her lines and would constantly change her line readings. Arthur Whitelaw was going to fire her and replace her with Totie Fields but it would have cost $300,000 to pay Winters out of her contract, so it was decided to keep her.

Theatre historian Ken Mandelbaum wrote Minnie's Boys "is a fine example of the dangers inherent in skipping a road tryout and the out-of-town reviews that go with it" "It was a mistake not to take the show out of town," agreed Arthur Marx.

=== Reception ===
The musical opened on Broadway at the Imperial Theatre officially on March 26, 1970. It was directed by Stanley Prager and choreographed by Marc Breaux, with scenic design by Peter Wexler, costume design by Donald Brooks and lighting by Jules Fisher. The cast featured Shelley Winters as Minnie Marx, Lewis J. Stadlen as Julius "Groucho" Marx, Daniel Fortus as Adolph "Harpo" Marx, Irwin Pearl as Leonard "Chico" Marx, Alvin Kupperman as Herbert "Zeppo" Marx, and Gary Raucher as Milton "Gummo" Marx.

According to Arthur Marx "everything clicked into place" on opening night. "Shelley Winters wasn't half bad. But what made the show was Lew Stadlin's brilliant portrayal of Groucho." The Los Angeles Times said "it may not be a great musical but it is a very nice one." There were also positive reviews from critics such as Richard Watts and Walter Kerr. However there was a highly negative review from Clive Barnes in The New York Times which was felt to have killed the show's commercial prospects.

The musical closed on May 30, 1970 after 80 performances. Minnie's Boys lost an estimated $750,000 on an investment of $550,000.

Groucho Marx received a playbill credit as the show's advisor; after the show closed, it was revealed that Groucho had made no real contributions, and had basically been paid off so that he would not raise any legal objections to the production. During its brief run, Groucho did help promote the musical by appearing on the Dick Cavett Show with Shelley Winters and the five young actors who portrayed the Marx boys in the show.

Stadlen won both the 1970 Theatre World Award and 1970 Drama Desk Award for Outstanding Performance in a Musical.

According to Ken Mandelbaum the main problem with the show was "its lead female character was never as fascinating or colorful as Gypsy’s Rose. The four boys, extremely well played in the musical, were far more entertaining and interesting than Minnie, but because a star had been hired for the part, the character had to be kept around even when she wasn't needed." However Mandelbaum has called the musical "a crowd pleaser" and it has received many subsequent amateur productions.

The score's song "Mama, a Rainbow" has become a standard for cabaret performers, and was recorded by Steve Lawrence and Jim Nabors soon after the show opened. In the show, the song is performed by Harpo, whose screen and stage persona was always silent.

== Cast Album ==
An original cast album was released by Project Three Records, although the cast album was originally scheduled to be recorded and released by RCA Victor.

== Revivals ==
The show received a 2008 revival staging under the direction of Stuart Ross at Off-Broadway's York Theatre Company. The cast included Erik Liberman, Pamela Myers, Jim Walton, Dan Bogart, Ryan Duncan, Nick Gaswirth, Beth Glover, Don Mayo, Nancy McCall, Emily Shoolin, Kelly Sullivan, and Stuart Zagnit.

== Casts ==
Character	Original Broadway Cast (1970)	Off-Broadway Revival (2008)
Minnie Marx	Shelley Winters	Pamela Myers
Julius "Groucho" Marx	Lewis J. Stadlen	Erik Lieberman
Leonard "Chico" Marx	Irwin Pearl	Ryan Duncan
Adolph "Harpo" Marx	Daniel Fortus	Nick Gaswirth
Herbert "Zeppo" Marx	Alvin Kupperman	Dan Bogart
Milton "Gummo" Marx	Gary Raucher	
Sam "Frenchie" Marx	Arny Freeman	Stuart Zagnit
Al Shean	Mort Marshall	Jim Walton
E.F. Albee	Roland Winters	Don Mayo
Hochmeister	Merwin Goldsmith	Don Mayo
Maxie	Richard B. Shull	Don Mayo
Mrs. McNish	Julie Kurnitz	Beth Glover
Mrs. Flanagan	Jean Bruno	Beth Glover
Mrs. Krupnik	Jacqueline Britt	Nancy McCall
Miss Murdock	Jacqueline Britt	Emily Shoolin

== Song list ==
Act I

- "Five Growing Boys"—Minnie and Neighbors
- "Rich Is"—Al Shean and The Marx Family
- "More Precious Far"—Julie, Herbie, Adolph, Minnie
- "Four Nightingales"—Julie, Herbie, Adolph
- "Underneath It All"—Maxie and Girls
- "Mama, a Rainbow"—Adolph and Minnie
- "You Don't Have to Do It for Me"—Minnie, Julie, Leonard, Adolph, Herbie
- "If You Wind Me Up"—Minnie, Julie, Herbie, Adolph, Leonard
- "Where Was I When They Passed Out Luck?"—Julie, Herbie, Adolph, Leonard

Act II

- "You Remind Me of You"—Julie and Mrs. McNish
- "Minnie's Boys"—Minnie and Company
- "Be Happy"—Minnie, Adolph, Leonard, Herbie, Miltie
- "The Act"—Julie, Herbie, Adolph, Leonard, Minnie
- "Finale"—Company

Cut prior to opening

- "Empty"—Frenchie
- "Guess Where I'm Going"
- "Stage Door Johnny"—Girls
- "The Smell of Christmas"—Julie, Leo, Herbie, Adolph
- "They Give Me Love"—Minnie
- "You're Getting Younger Every Day"—Minnie and Frenchie
- "I'll Say She Is"

Added to later productions

- "Philadelphia"—Minnie

== Notes ==
- Marx, Arthur (1993). My life with Groucho.
