= Zeppo Marx =

American entertainer (1901–1979)

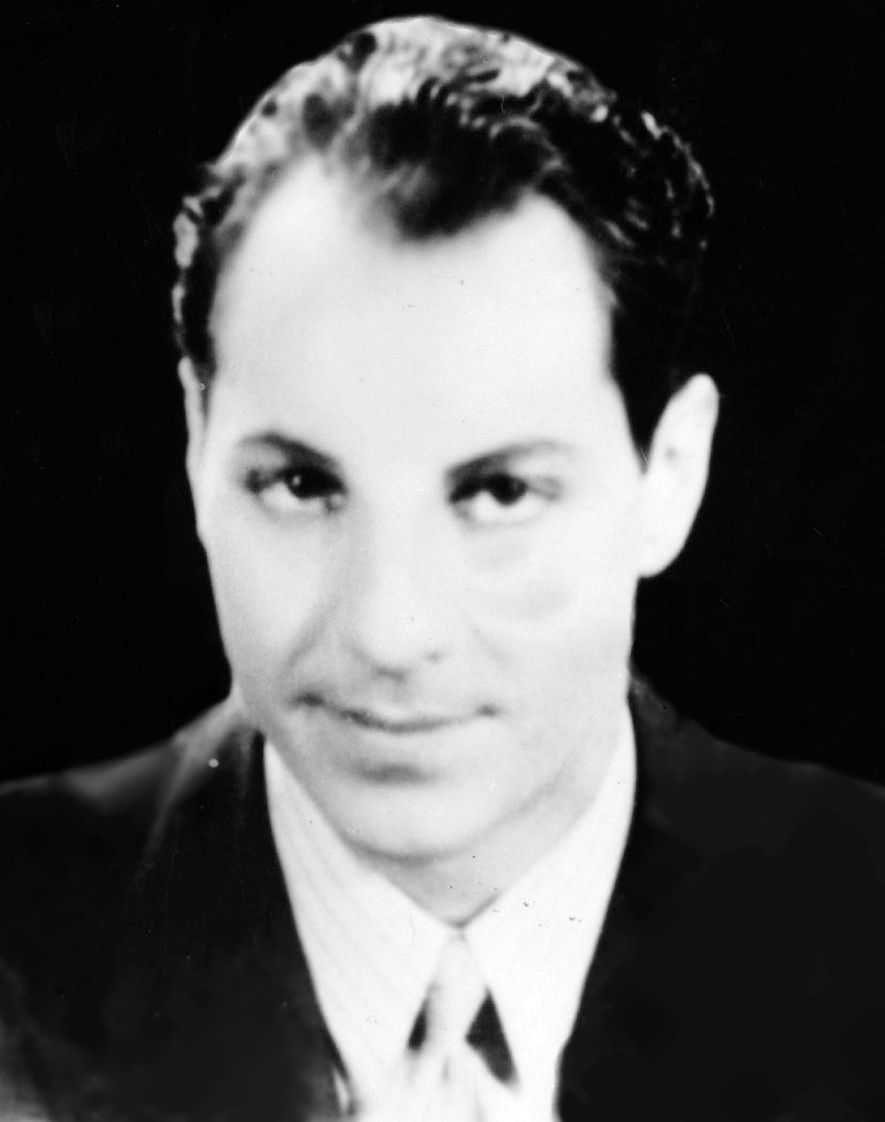
- Zeppo in 1931
- Born: Herbert Manfred Marx; February 25, 1901; New York City, New York, U.S.
- Died: November 30, 1979 (aged 78); Rancho Mirage, California, U.S.
- Other name: Herbert Marx
- Occupations: Actor; comedian; theatrical agent; engineer
- Years active: 1918−1978
- Known for: Duck Soup, Monkey Business, Marman clamp
- Spouses: Marion Benda (m. 1927; div. 1954) Barbara Blakeley (m. 1959; div. 1973)
- Children: 2
- Parents: Sam "Frenchie" Marx (father); Minnie Schönberg (mother)
- Relatives: Chico Marx (older brother); Harpo Marx (older brother); Groucho Marx (older brother); Gummo Marx (older brother); Al Shean (maternal uncle); Arthur Marx (nephew); Miriam Marx (niece); Melinda Marx (niece); Bill Marx (nephew)

Herbert Manfred "Zeppo" Marx (February 25, 1901 – November 30, 1979) was an American comedic actor and businessman. He was the youngest, and last survivor, of the five Marx Brothers. He appeared with his brothers on Broadway during the 1920s and in the first five Marx Brothers feature films from 1929 to 1933, usually performing in a more subdued style than his brothers and serving as a romantic lead and/or straight man. After Duck Soup (1933), he abandoned acting for subsequent careers as an engineer and theatrical agent.

== Early life ==
Marx was born in Manhattan. His parents were Sam Marx (called "Frenchie" throughout his life) and Minnie Schönberg Marx. Minnie's brother was Al Shean, who later gained fame as half of the vaudeville team Gallagher and Shean. His mother was from East Frisia in Germany and his father was a tailor from Alsace, France.

== Name ==
As with all of the Marx Brothers, various theories exist regarding the origin of Zeppo's stage name. His older brother Groucho said in his Carnegie Hall concert in 1972 that the name was derived from the Zeppelin airship, and Zeppo's ex-wife Barbara Sinatra repeated this claim in her 2011 book Lady Blue Eyes: My Life with Frank. In his 1961 autobiography Harpo Speaks!, older brother Harpo said that there was a trained chimpanzee named Mr. Zippo that Herbert would imitate, but when Herbert objected to being named after a chimp, it was altered to Zeppo. In a rare television interview years later, Zeppo said that "Zep" was Italian-American slang for "baby", and the name fit as he was the youngest of the brothers.

== Career ==
=== Early career and the Marx Brothers ===
Zeppo replaced brother Gummo in the Marx Brothers' stage act when Gummo was drafted into the army in 1918. Zeppo had been employed as a mechanic for the Ford Motor Company. He had no desire for a show business career, but Minnie Marx insisted that he replace Gummo because she wanted to maintain the act as a foursome. Zeppo remained with the team in vaudeville, Broadway and the first five Marx Brothers films as the straight man and romantic lead until leaving the act following Duck Soup in 1933. He also appeared, without his brothers, performing a minor role in the Adolphe Menjou comedy A Kiss in the Dark (1925), billed as Herbert Marx. His performance was praised by the New York Sun.

Barbara Sinatra (Zeppo's second wife) said that he was considered too young to perform with his brothers, but when Gummo joined the army, Zeppo was asked to join the act as a last-minute replacement at a show in Texas. He and a Jewish friend were supposed to have a date with two Irish girls, but Zeppo canceled in order to board the train to Texas. Several hours later, his friend was shot by a gang that disapproved of Jews dating Irish girls.

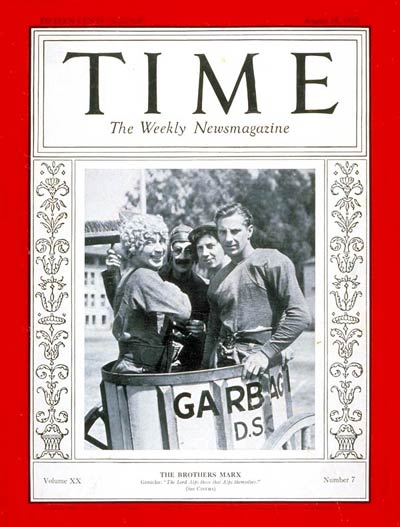
Zeppo (far right) with his brothers Harpo, Groucho, and Chico on the cover of Time in 1932

Having watched his brothers for many years, Zeppo could imitate and stand in for any of the others when illness kept them from performing live on stage, most notably stepping in for Groucho during a tour of their greatest scenes when Groucho was recovering from appendicitis. This tour took place around the release of the film Animal Crackers. Groucho said: "He was so good as Captain Spaulding in Animal Crackers that I would have let him play the part indefinitely if they had allowed me to smoke in the audience." (Note: Some have suggested that Zeppo appears as Groucho during a blackout scene in the filmed version of Animal Crackers. There is no direct evidence that Zeppo doubled for Groucho in this scene. Film scholars have noted that the brothers' characters appear to be played by stand-ins during the blackout sequence where the paintings are switched. No known documentation indicates whether stand-ins were used, nor why they would have been used, or what their identities would have been.) However, Zeppo did not develop his own comic persona to play against those of his brothers. Critic Percy Hammond wrote in 1928:

One of the handicaps to the thorough enjoyment of the Marx Brothers in their merry escapades is the plight of poor Zeppo Marx. While Groucho, Harpo, and Chico are hogging the show, as the phrase has it, their brother hides in an insignificant role, peeping out now and then to listen to plaudits in which he has no share.

The popular assumption that Zeppo's character was superfluous was fueled in part by Groucho. According to Groucho's own story, when the group became the Three Marx Brothers, the studio wanted to trim their collective salary, and Groucho replied, "We're twice as funny without Zeppo!"

Zeppo was mechanically adept and largely responsible for keeping the Marx family car running. He later owned Marman Products Co., which machined parts for the war effort during World War II. The company produced a motorcycle called the Marman Twin as well as the Marman clamps used to hold the atomic bombs inside the B-29 bombers Enola Gay and Bockscar. He obtained patents for a wristwatch that monitored pulse rate and sounded an alarm if the heartbeat became irregular, and a therapeutic pad for delivering moist heat to a patient.

The 2024 book by Robert S Bader Zeppo: The Reluctant Marx Brother said that Zeppo was deeply associated with gangsters, and was called to testify before a grand jury in 1958 about missing funds in a gambling syndicate. According to Bader his brothers were so worried about his associates and high-stakes gambling that they considered disowning him; but they were always personally close.

After retiring from the screen, Zeppo founded a large theatrical agency with his brother Gummo and they represented numerous screenwriters and actors, including their brothers.

== Personal life ==
Zeppo introduced Mary Livingstone to Jack Benny during a Passover seder; they married in 1926.

On April 12, 1927, Zeppo married Marion Benda (née Bimberg). They adopted two children, Timothy and Thomas, in 1944 and 1945, and divorced on May 12, 1954. On September 18, 1959, Zeppo married Barbara Blakeley. He wanted to adopt and give his surname to her son Bobby Oliver, but Bobby's father would not allow it. However, Bobby did later use the last name of Marx.

Barbara, a Methodist, wrote in her book Lady Blue Eyes that Zeppo never forced her to convert to Judaism, but that he told her that she became Jewish by "injection". Barbara also wrote that Zeppo wanted to keep her son at a distance and added a guest house separated from the main residence for him. Zeppo was reportedly pleased when the boy was sent to military school.

Zeppo owned a house on Halper Lake Drive in Rancho Mirage, California, near the residence of Frank Sinatra. Along with his brothers Groucho and Harpo, Zeppo was a member of the Hillcrest Country Club with friends such as Sinatra, George Burns, Jack Benny, Danny Kaye, Sid Caesar and Milton Berle.

Barbara became involved with Cedars-Sinai Medical Center and had arranged to show Spartacus (1960) for charity, selling tickets and organizing a post-screening ball. At the last minute, Barbara was told that she could not show the film, so Zeppo spoke to Sinatra, who gave them an early release of the recently completed Come Blow Your Horn. Sinatra also flew everyone involved to Palm Springs for the event.

Sinatra began to invite Barbara and Zeppo to his house two or three times per week, and often sent champagne and wine to their home. Barbara and Sinatra began a love affair without Zeppo's knowledge, and the tabloid newspapers published photos showing them together. Barbara and Sinatra denied the affair until after she and Zeppo divorced in 1973.

In the divorce settlement, Zeppo allowed Barbara to keep a 1969 Jaguar XK-E, and agreed to pay her US$1,500 (equivalent to $10,879 in 2025) per month for 10 years. Barbara and Frank Sinatra continued to date and were hounded by the press until her divorce became final; they married in 1976.

In 1973, 37-year old Jean Bodul, the future wife of mobster Jimmy Fratianno, accused Zeppo of assaulting her; she sued and a jury awarded her $20,690 in 1978 (equivalent to $102,130 in 2025).

Zeppo became ill with cancer in 1978. The disease went into remission but returned. An ailing Zeppo turned to his former wife Barbara for support and she accompanied him to medical appointments and treatment sessions. He spent his last days with her family.

== Death ==
Zeppo died of lung cancer at the Eisenhower Medical Center in Rancho Mirage on November 30, 1979, at the age of 78. He was cremated and his ashes were scattered into the Pacific Ocean.

In his will, Zeppo left stepson Bobby Marx a few possessions and enough money to finish law school. Frank and Barbara Sinatra attended his funeral.

== Legacy ==
While Zeppo is perceived as the Marx Brothers' "straight man", several critics have argued that he developed a unique comic persona. James Agee considered him "a peerlessly cheesy improvement on the traditional straight man." Along similar lines, Gerald Mast noted that Zeppo was "too schleppy, too nasal, and too wooden to be taken seriously." Reviewing the 1924 play I'll Say She Is, The New York Daily News called Zeppo "the obliging audience of the family – the feeder who helps his brothers be funny by playing straight himself." The New York Times described Zeppo as "the handsome but dogged straight man with the charisma of an enamel washstand."

Other observers have noted that Zeppo's role often involved acting as an interpreter for the audience. In her book Hello, I Must Be Going: Groucho & His Friends, Charlotte Chandler defended Zeppo as "the Marx Brothers' interpreter in the worlds they invaded." Groucho himself confirmed this, noting that Zeppo's role was "handsome, obtuse, slightly wooden" and that he "brought logic to a basically illogical story." Allen W. Ellis further articulated this, describing Zeppo as "a link between the audience and Groucho, Harpo and Chico," and as being "crucial to the absurdity of the Paramount films" due to his incongruity: dressing like a normal person, in contrast to the more outlandish garb of his brothers.

Some critics have noted that Zeppo fills a unique role in the Brothers' films because he is a straight man whom Groucho has to treat equally. Joe Adamson highlighted Zeppo's ability to best Groucho with simple rebuttals in the dictation scene of Animal Crackers, concluding, "It takes a Marx Brother to pull something like that on a Marx Brother and get away with it." Adamson also noted Zeppo's position as the campy parody of the juvenile romantic in Horse Feathers, where "the effect crosses the threshold into lovable comedy." Critic Danél Griffin believed that Zeppo's onscreen relationship with Groucho was crucial, as Zeppo was "seemingly capable of reducing Groucho to stunned silence with simple, plain-English rebuttals.

Other critics have emphasized the difference in team dynamic with Zeppo. Robert S. Bader observed that the Marx Brothers as a trio without Zeppo should be considered a different comedy team, stating that "while Zeppo may not be as busy as his brothers, they function best as a quartet." Critic Adam Gopnik argued that the Marxes were "never quite as good again after they lost their one straight man," as "Zeppo's inclusion in the family made the others less like clowns and more like brothers."

Over the decades, Zeppo has found fans and influenced other film professionals. In a eulogy, columnist Tom Zito praised Zeppo as "the Everyman, the loser who'd come running out of the grocery store only to find the meter maid sticking the parking ticket on his Hungadunga." As a teenager, Cary Grant was inspired by Zeppo, believing his "foil timing... was the real key to the act's success." Filmmaker Rainer Werner Fassbinder included Zeppo among the ten greatest film actors of all time.

== In popular culture ==
In an episode of the television series Cheers, Lilith Crane says that Zeppo was her favorite Marx brother.

A third-season episode of the television series Buffy the Vampire Slayer is titled "The Zeppo" and focuses on the perspective of character Xander Harris, whose position as the least impressive or capable member of the cast is compared to the similar perception of Zeppo Marx.

The Mystery Science Theater 3000 character TV's Frank revealed in Episode 323 featuring Sax Rohmer's The Castle of Fu Manchu that while he was working at Arby's, he was given the nickname of Zeppo because of his supposed sense of humor.

== Filmography ==
=== Film ===
Year	Title	Role	Notes
1921	Humor Risk	The Love Interest	Short, lost
1925	A Kiss in the Dark	unknown role	
1929	The Cocoanuts	Jamison	
1930	Animal Crackers	Horatio W. Jamison	
1931	The House That Shadows Built	Sammy Brown	
1931	Monkey Business	Zeppo	
1932	Horse Feathers	Frank Wagstaff	
1933	Duck Soup	Lt. Bob Roland, Firefly's secretary	(his last role)
