= Gummo Marx =

American comedian (1892–1977)

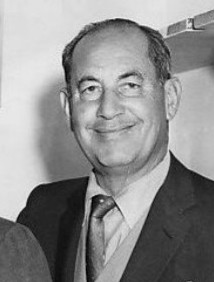
- Gummo at a reunion of his brothers on the Tonight Show
- Born: Milton Marx; October 23, 1892; New York City, New York, U.S.
- Died: April 21, 1977 (aged 84); Palm Springs, California, U.S.
- Resting place: Forest Lawn Memorial Park Cemetery, Glendale, California, U.S.
- Occupations: Vaudevillian; actor; comedian; theatrical agent
- Years active: 1899−1918
- Spouse: Helen von Tilzer (m. 1929; died 1976)
- Children: 2
- Parents: Sam "Frenchie" Marx (father); Minnie Schönberg (mother)
- Relatives: Chico Marx (older brother); Harpo Marx (older brother); Groucho Marx (older brother); Zeppo Marx (younger brother); Al Shean (maternal uncle); Gregg Marx (grandson); Arthur Marx (nephew); Miriam Marx (niece); Melinda Marx (niece); Bill Marx (nephew)

Milton "Gummo" Marx (October 23, 1892 – April 21, 1977) was an American vaudeville performer, theatrical agent and businessman. He was the fourth-born of the five Marx Brothers. Born in Manhattan, he worked with his brothers on the vaudeville circuit, leaving the act when he was drafted into the U.S. Army in 1918 during World War I and replaced by his brother Zeppo. He had no desire for an acting career, never appeared in any of his brothers' films, and became a successful businessman.

== Early life ==
Marx was born in Manhattan, New York City, on October 23, 1892. (Note: The 1900 United States Census shows his birth as "October 1892". His World War I and World War II draft registrations uses "October 21, 1892". His death certificate and his grave use the year 1893. The documents originating closest to the birth date are usually more accurate.) His parents were Sam Marx (called "Frenchie" throughout his life), and Minnie Schoenberg Marx. Marx's family was Jewish. His mother was from Dornum in East Frisia, and his father was a native of Alsace and worked as a tailor.

== Career ==
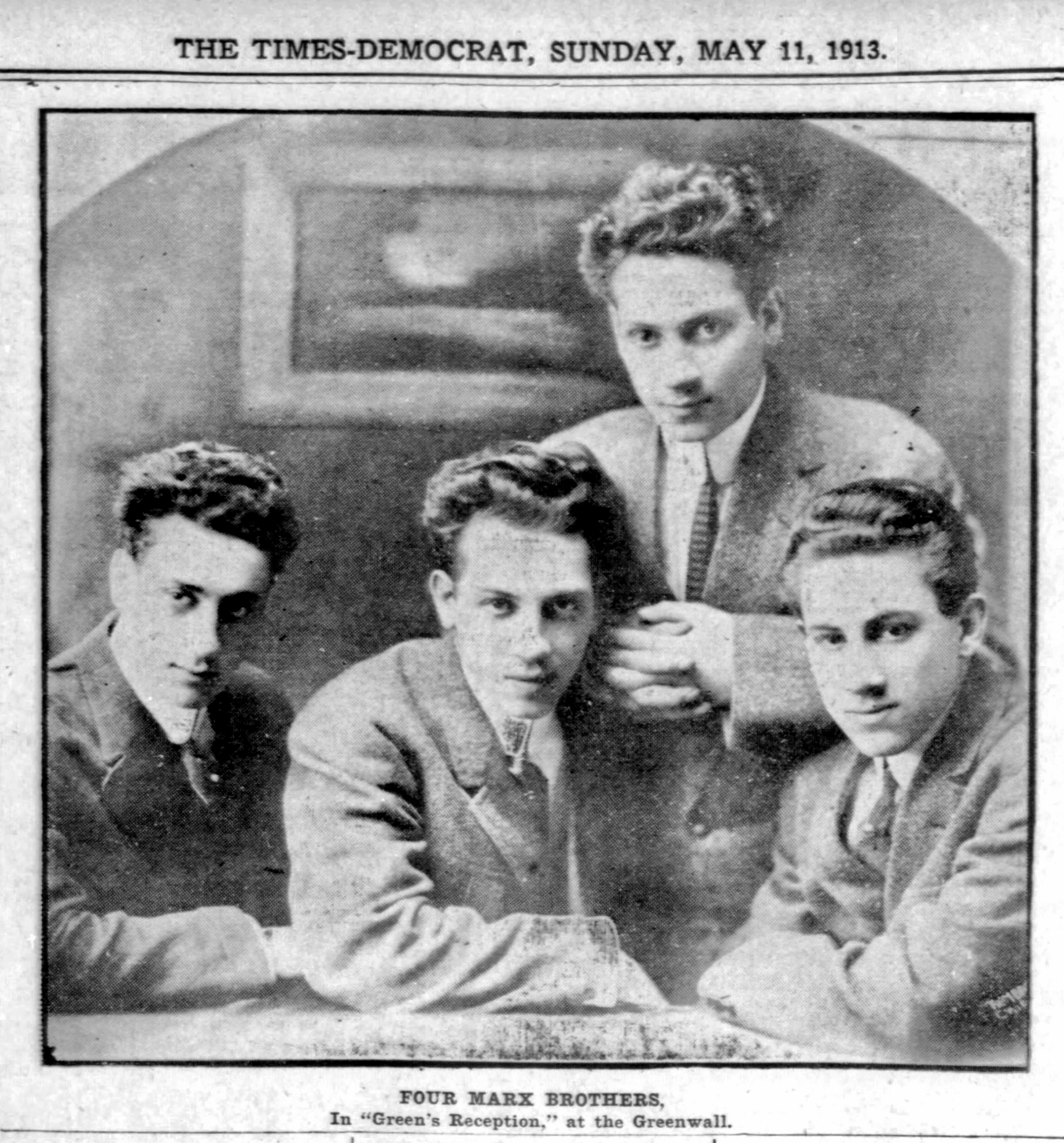
1913 advertisement for "Green's Reception" at the Greenwall. Left to right, Groucho, Chico, Harpo and Gummo.

Gummo was the first of his brothers to make his debut on stage, pretending to be a dummy in an act with his uncle Henry Shean (né Heinemann Schoenberg), the brother of Al Shean, in 1899. Milton was put into a costume with a papier-mâché head and pretended to be a dummy while Henry pretended to work him. The act may have only been performed once and was not helped by Shean's deafness or Milton's stammer.

Gummo, who in an interview said he never liked being on stage, left the group and joined the military during World War I. He was not sent overseas because the armistice was signed shortly afterward. Gummo's younger brother Zeppo took his place in the group. After his Army career, Gummo went into the raincoat business. He later joined with Zeppo and operated a theatrical agency. After that collaboration ended, Gummo represented his brother Groucho and worked on the television show The Life of Riley, which he helped develop.

Gummo represented other on-screen talent and a number of writers, and was well-respected as a businessman. He rarely required contracts, believing that if the people he represented liked his work, they would stay with him. Around the time he left his brothers' Vaudeville act, Marx applied for a patent for a clothes-packing rack. On October 28, 1919, Marx was granted patent US1320335A.

Gummo may have received his nickname because he had a tendency to sneak around backstage, creeping up on others like a "gumshoe" private detective. Another explanation cited by biographers and family members is that Milton, the sickliest of the brothers, often wore rubber overshoes, also called "gumshoes", to protect himself in inclement weather. According to Zeppo in a much later BBC TV interview, Gummo may have received his nickname because he was usually chewing gum.

== Personal life and death ==
Marx married Helen von Tilzer née Theaman (who had a two-year-old daughter, Karlyn "Kay" von Tilzer, from her previous marriage), on May 3, 1929; they remained married until her death in January 1976. Their son, Robert Stuart, was born on August 19, 1930. Gummo's grandson Gregg Marx is an actor.

Crypt of Gummo Marx

Gummo died on April 21, 1977, at his home in Palm Springs, California, aged 84, from a cerebral hemorrhage. His death was never reported to Groucho, who by that time had become so ill and weak that it was thought the news would be a further detriment to his health. Groucho died four months later on August 19, at age 86.

Gummo and his wife Helen are interred next to each other in the Freedom Mausoleum at the Forest Lawn Memorial Park in Glendale, California. Gummo's brother Chico is in a crypt across the hall from them. Gummo's only biological child, Robert, served in the United States Coast Guard for two years and later worked as an architect. He died on May 21, 2023, aged 92.
