= Minnie Marx =

Mother and manager of the Marx Brothers (1864-1929)

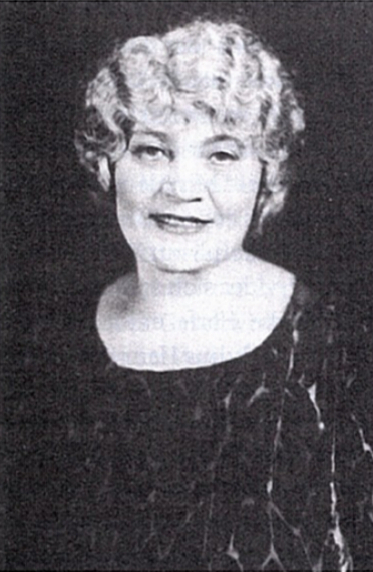
- Born: Miene Schönberg; 9 November 1864; Dornum, East Frisia, Kingdom of Hanover
- Died: 13 September 1929 (aged 64); New York City, U.S.
- Other name: Minnie Palmer
- Spouse: Sam "Frenchie" Marx (m. 1884)
- Children: Manfred Marx (1885–1886); Leonard "Chico" Marx; Adolph "Harpo" Marx; Julius "Groucho" Marx; Milton "Gummo" Marx; Herbert "Zeppo" Marx
- Relatives: Al Shean (brother)

Minnie Marx (born Miene Schönberg, Yiddish: מיענע שענבערג מארקס; 9 November 1864 – 13 September 1929) was the mother and manager of the Marx Brothers, a family of top-billed vaudevillians, top Broadway stars and, finally, film stars. She was also the sister of comedian and vaudeville star Al Shean.

== Early life ==
Marx was born Miene Schönberg in Dornum, Kingdom of Hanover. Her parents Fanny née Salomons (Yiddish: פאַני סאַלאָמאָן שאָנבערג; 1829–April 10,1901) and Levy "Lafe" Schönberg (Yiddish: לעווי שאָנבערג; 1823–1919) were members of the local Jewish community. Her mother was a yodeling harpist, her father a ventriloquist. Her younger brother, Abraham Elieser Adolf, the future "Al Shean," was born in 1868.

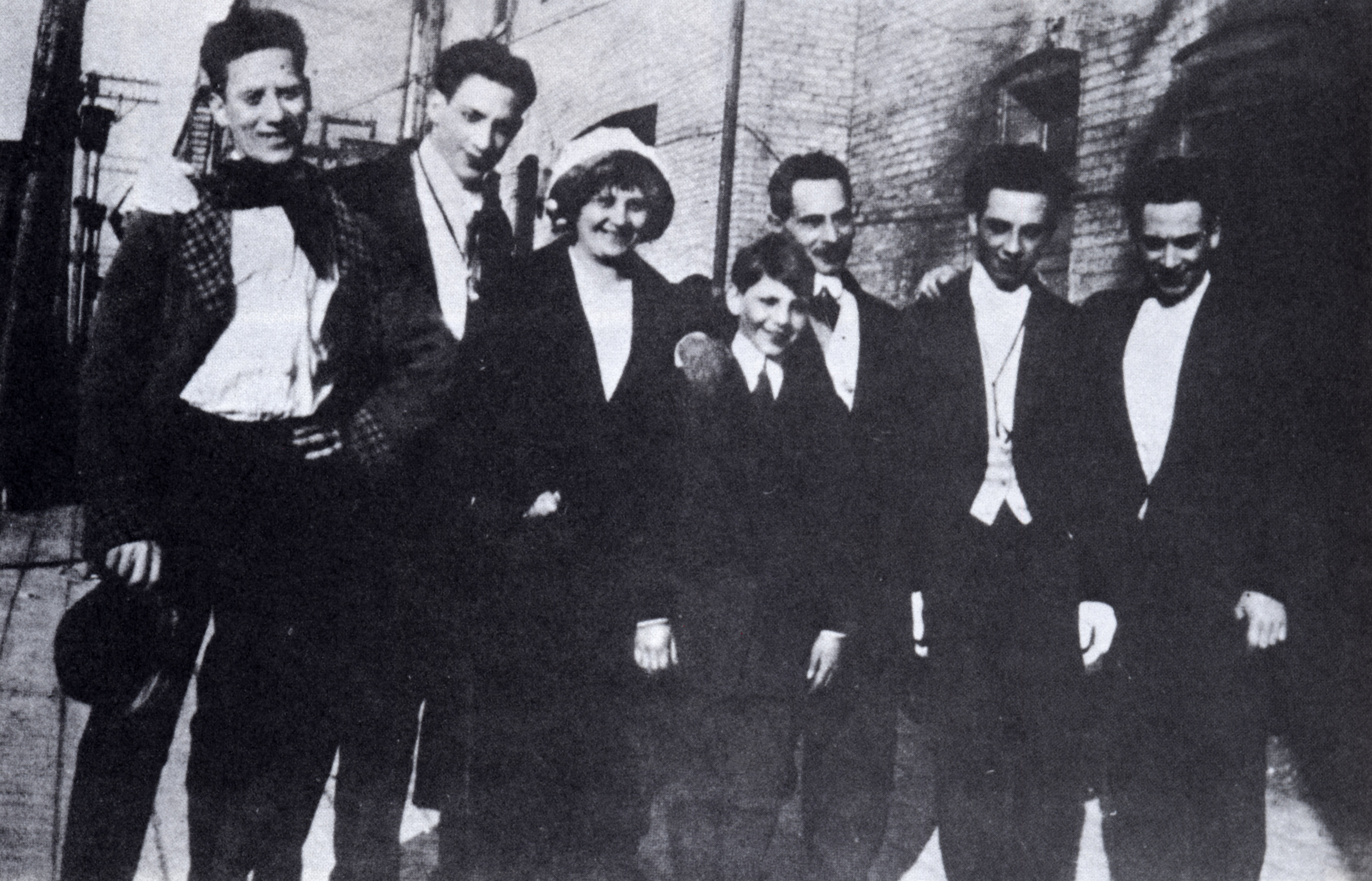
Minnie with her husband Sam and their sons Chico, Harpo, Groucho, Gummo and Zeppo in 1915

About 1880 the family emigrated to New York City, where Minnie married Samuel "Frenchie" Marx in 1884.

Her son Manfred died in infancy in 1886. Her other children were Leonard Joseph (born 1887), Adolph (1888), Julius (1890), Milton (1892) and Herbert (1901), who would grow up to perform as the Marx Brothers.

== Career ==
While managing the Marx Brothers, she went under the name of Minnie Palmer, so that booking agents would not know that the agent representing the Marx Brothers was their mother. She played the harp.

As a tribute to her, all the brothers' daughters were given names that began with 'M': Chico with Maxine; Harpo with Minnie; and Groucho with Miriam and Melinda. Gummo and Zeppo had no daughters.

Minnie lived long enough to see her sons' 1929 film debut in The Cocoanuts, but died later that year of a stroke.

== Death ==
Marx died from a stroke on September 13, 1929, aged 64. She was buried at Mount Carmel Cemetery in Glendale, Queens. When her husband died four years later, he was buried next to her.

== In popular culture ==
Marx and some of her sons appear briefly as characters in Glen David Gold's novel Carter Beats the Devil; the narrative identifies her as Minnie Palmer, and only gradually offers clues that the struggling vaudeville act traveling with her are the later-famous Marx Brothers. Marx (played by Shelley Winters) was also the main character in the stage musical Minnie's Boys.
