= Sam Marx =

American vaudevillian (1859-1933)

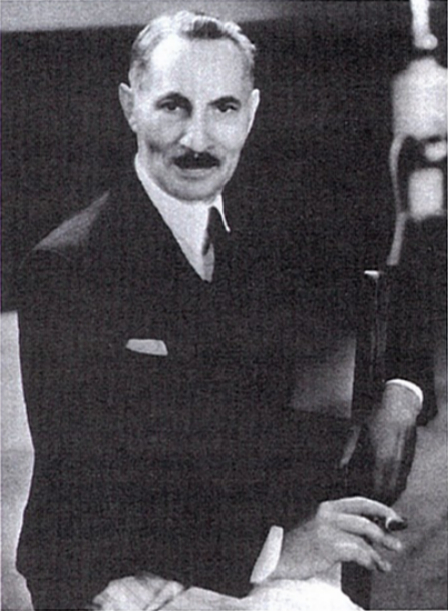
- Marx in 1923
- Born: Simon Marx; October 23, 1859; Mertzwiller, Alsace, France
- Died: May 10, 1933 (aged 73); Los Angeles, California, U.S.
- Other name: Frenchie
- Occupation: Tailor (made cameo appearance in sons' film Monkey Business)
- Years active: 1880–1933
- Spouse: Minnie Schönberg (m. 1884; died 1929)
- Children: Manfred Marx (1885–1886); Leonard Joseph "Chico" Marx (1887–1961); Adolph Arthur "Harpo" Marx (1888–1964); Julius Henry "Groucho" Marx (1890–1977); Milton "Gummo" Marx (1893–1977); Herbert Manfred "Zeppo" Marx (1901–1979)

Samuel Simon Marx (born Simon Marx; October 23, 1859 – May 10, 1933) was the father of the American entertainers known as the Marx Brothers, stars of vaudeville, Broadway and film, and the husband of Minnie Marx, who served as the group's manager.

== Life and family ==
According to his birth certificate, Marx was born as Simon Marx in Alsace, in France. Due to his place of birth, he was known as "Frenchie". His parents were Simon Marx and Johanna Haennchen Isaak. He came to the U.S. from France in 1880. He met Minnie in New York where he was working as a dance teacher. They married in 1884 and had six sons. Their first son, Manfred, born in 1885, died in infancy. The other children were Leonard (Chico), born in 1887, Adolph (Harpo) in 1888, Julius (Groucho) in 1890, Milton (Gummo) in 1892, and Herbert (Zeppo) in 1901. Marx was an excellent pinochle player and taught the game to his two eldest sons.

== Career ==
Marx made his living as a tailor, albeit reportedly one who was not very successful or competent in the trade. According to Groucho, his real talents lay in the culinary arts, often convincing the landlord to delay their rent pay time with a good meal. In his show An Evening With Groucho, Groucho said:

"My father was a tailor, and a very bad one, and Chico was always short of money, and he used to hock my father's shears, so whenever my father made a suit, of course it didn't fit, and the shears would be hanging up in the pawnshop on Ninety-first Street."

In his last interview, Zeppo joked that his late father "was a very bad tailor but he found some people who were so stupid that they would buy his clothes, and so he'd make a few dollars that way for food".

== Cameo appearance with his sons ==
Marx made a cameo appearance in his four sons' film Monkey Business (1931), sitting on top of luggage behind the brothers on the pier as they wave to the First Officer, having slipped off the ship without being arrested as stowaways. (In some interviews, this scene has been mistakenly attributed to A Night at the Opera.)

== Death ==
Marx died in Hollywood, California, on May 10, 1933, from complications due to kidney failure, aged 73.

He was survived by his brother-in-law Al Shean, sons Chico, Harpo, Groucho, Gummo and Zeppo Marx and grandchildren Maxine, Arthur, Miriam and Robert "Bob" Marx. He was interred at Mount Carmel Cemetery in Glendale, Queens next to his late wife Minnie (who predeceased him in September 1929).
