= Humor Risk =

1921 film by Richard Smith

- The Marx Brothers in 1921. Pictured left to right: Zeppo, Groucho, Harpo, and Chico
- Directed by: Dick Smith
- Written by: Jo Swerling
- Produced by: The Marx Brothers; Al Posen; Max Lippman; Jo Swerling
- Starring: Chico Marx; Groucho Marx; Harpo Marx; Zeppo Marx; Jobyna Ralston
- Cinematography: A. H. Vallet
- Distributed by: Caravel Comedies
- Running time: 2 reels
- Country: United States
- Languages: Silent film English intertitles

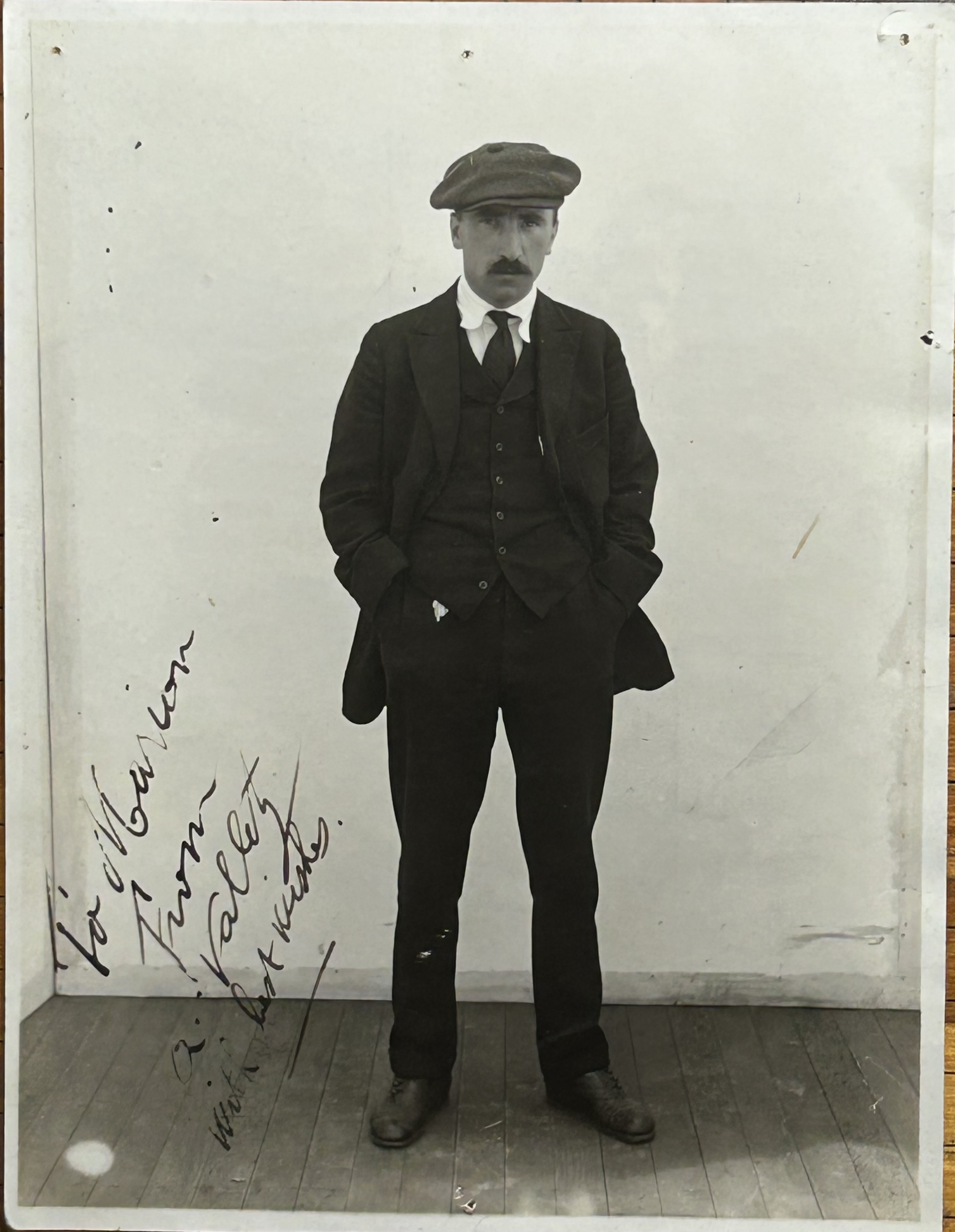
Abel H. Vallet (1916)

Humor Risk, also known as Humorisk, is a lost unreleased 1921 silent comedy short film. It is the first film to star the Marx Brothers, and was the only Marx Brothers movie until the release of their 1929 musical comedy The Cocoanuts. The title parodies the popular 1920 film Humoresque.

== Plot ==
Information about the plot of Humor Risk is sparse. According to Kyle Crichton's 1951 biography of the Brothers, Harpo played Watson, the hero and romantic lead who "made his entrance in a high hat, sliding down a coal chute into the basement." Groucho played the villain, who in the finale was shown "in ball and chain, trudging slowly off into the gloaming." In his book Monkey Business, Simon Louvish claims Harpo's character was a detective.

== Cast ==
Four of the five Marx Brothers are known to have appeared in this short film: Chico, Groucho, Harpo, and Zeppo all starred, leaving Gummo the only Brother with no known appearance.

=== Leading lady ===
Jobyna Ralston is most often credited as the female lead of Humor Risk, due in part to her face resembling that of the lead actress in the film's single surviving production still. However, some sources claim that Mildred Davis (star and later wife of Harold Lloyd) was also in the film, although other researchers have suggested that Groucho Marx simply misremembered when writing about the film in his biography decades later. The websites Marxology and SilentEra both state that the leading lady may also have been one of two other actresses, Esther Ralston or Helen Kane. Ralston never mentioned working with the Marx Brothers, however, and the Brothers themselves never seem to have named Kane as a collaborator.

One account of the production claims that Dick Smith's mother visited the studio and sat down at a table during shooting, but consequently had to return the next three consecutive days for continuity's sake.

== Production ==
Jo Swerling played a key role in funding the project, raising $6000. Additional funding was provided by the Marxes, cartoonist (and producer, in some sources) Alvah "Al" Posen, Nathan Sachs, and Max Lippman. Nathan Sachs had previously partnered with Max Lippman at a law firm. Sachs made his fortune in the oil business and was a patron of the Marxes both during and long after Humor Risk.

Information on Humor Risk's filming location is contradictory. Author Allan Eyles has stated that the film was shot in Fort Lee, New Jersey. Groucho Marx wrote in his autobiography that it was "shot on the west side of New York," recalling that the Brothers were working at the Palace Theater and had to run across town to Weehawken to do a scene. Over time, researchers and fans have pointed to numerous studios in New Jersey and New York as potential film shoot locations for Humor Risk. Author Charlotte Chandler wryly described the movie as "shot in New Jersey, lost in New York." Matthew Coniam has claimed, on his website Marxology, that the film was shot at "Victor Studios", a name that originally referred to a lot in Fort Lee which Universal Studios purchased in 1917. The "new Victor studio" was opened in 1915 at 643 West 43rd Street in New York City. Dubbed "the cheapest studio in New York to work in," this second Victor location seems the most likely choice for the Brothers and their relatively low-budget crew, per Coniam.

== Release ==
The film was first shown to the public, potentially in an incomplete form, at a children's matinee in early December 1921. The earliest mention of Humor Risk in an industry newspaper came in Wid's Daily (later The Film Daily) on April 8, 1921, ahead of the film's release. That press statement claims that the Marxes had just signed onto a comedy film series with Caravel Comedies – Caravel was in fact created by the Marxes themselves for the purpose of aiding in their film debuts, and never consisted of much more than a post office box.

=== Surviving copies ===
Kyle Crichton has claimed the film was destroyed except for one rogue print, which was used by friends of the brothers for "jovial blackmail". Marx Brothers researcher Hector Arce has disputed this account, claiming instead that the only film print was burned (by Groucho) and the negatives were kept in Posen's closet. Matthew Coniam provided another version of events, writing that Reelcraft reportedly picked it up and filed it under another name, writing, "where could it be? That was the only film the brothers made that year." Max Lippman may also have owned a copy, as his estate (which was locked in a bidding war through much of the 1930s) contained some dull, unmarked canisters.

Reelcraft sold nearly 200 negatives in its possession at an auction in 1922, some of which may have contained portions of Humor Risk.

=== Sequels ===
Silent short films of this era were often sold to distributors as part of a larger set, and Humor Risk was billed in the press as the first of a series titled "Comedies Without Custard". According to a Film Daily headline from April 11, 1921, Humor Risk would have been followed by two sequel comedies: Hick, Hick, Hooray and Hot Dog. However, there is no known evidence that the planned follow-up films were ever actually created.

== See also ==
- List of United States comedy films
- List of lost films
