= Lewis J. Stadlen =

American actor

- Born: March 7, 1947 (age 79); Brooklyn, New York, U.S.
- Occupation: Actor
- Years active: 1966–present
- Spouse: Mary MacLeod (ex)
- Children: Diana Stadlen Taylor, Peter Stadlen

Lewis J. Stadlen (born March 7, 1947) is an American stage and screen character actor. He is best known for playing Ira Fried in The Sopranos.

== Career ==
=== Stage ===
Born in Brooklyn, New York, to voice actor Allen Swift, Stadlen studied acting with Sanford Meisner and Stella Adler. He made his Broadway debut as Groucho Marx in the musical comedy Minnie's Boys in 1970. Other noted Broadway roles include Senex in A Funny Thing Happened on the Way to the Forum, Banjo in a revival of The Man Who Came to Dinner, Milt in Laughter on the 23rd Floor, and Voltaire/Dr. Pangloss in the 1974 Broadway production of Candide. He has been nominated for two Tony Awards during his career.

The Time of Your Life was revived on March 17, 1972, at the Huntington Hartford Theater in Los Angeles, with Stadlen, Henry Fonda, Richard Dreyfuss, Ron Thompson, Strother Martin, Gloria Grahame, Jane Alexander, Richard X. Slattery and Pepper Martin among the cast and Edwin Sherin directing.

=== Film ===
Stadlen's film credits include Portnoy's Complaint (1972), Serpico (1973), The Verdict (1982), To Be or Not to Be 1983), Windy City (1984), and In & Out (1997).

=== Television ===
In 1966, Stadlen made his debut in a single appearance on The Edge of Night, playing a newsboy. His television credits in the 1970s were limited to guest appearances until 1979, when he was cast as a series regular in the first season of Benson as John Taylor, Governor Gatling's chief of staff.

Stadlen found this role to be dissatisfying, frequently clashing with producers over the scripts and the direction of his character. He asked to be released from his contract, leaving him to be replaced in the second season by René Auberjonois, who assumed the role of Clayton Endicott. He also has appeared in Law & Order and The Sopranos.

His autobiography, Acting Foolish, was published by Bear Manor in 2009.

== Awards and nominations ==
Year	Award	Category	Work	Result
1970	Drama Desk Award	Outstanding Performance	Minnie's Boys	Won
1970	Theatre World Award		Minnie's Boys	Won
1974	Tony Award	Best Actor in a Musical	Candide	Nominated
1996	Tony Award	Best Featured Actor in a Musical	A Funny Thing Happened on the Way to the Forum	Nominated
2001	Drama Desk Award	Outstanding Featured Actor in a Play	The Man Who Came to Dinner	Nominated

== Credits ==
=== Film ===
Year	Title	Role	Notes
1972	Portnoy's Complaint	Mandel	
1972	Savages	Julian Branch, a Song Writer	
1972	Parades	Potofski	
1973	Serpico	Jerry Berman	
1977	Between the Lines	Stanley	
1982	Soup for One	Allan's Father	
1982	The Verdict	Dr. Gruber	
1983	To Be or Not to Be	Lupinsky	
1984	Windy City	Marty	
1990	Funny About Love	Avi	
1994	I.Q.	Moderator	
1995	The Real Shlemiel	Lekish / Zeinvel / The Peddler	Voice
1997	In & Out	Ed Kenrow	
1998	The Impostors	Bandleader	

=== Television ===
Year	Title	Role	Notes
1966	The Edge of Night	Newsboy	1 episode
1970	George M!	The Stage Manager	TV movie
1975	Three to Get Ready	Dr. Carl Smeltz	TV movie
1975	Judge Horton and the Scottsboro Boys	Sam Liebowitz	TV movie
1979-1980	Benson	John Taylor	23 episodes
1980	Omnibus	Groucho Marx	1 episode
1987	Murder by the Book	Norman Wagstaff	TV movie, uncredited
1988	Monsters	Jay Blake	1 episode
1986	The Equalizer	Mr. Cooper	Episode: "A Community of Civilized Men"
1989	The Equalizer	Danny	Episode: "The Caper"
1991	Law & Order	Eli Schwab	1 episode
1995	New York News		1 episode
2000	The Man Who Came to Dinner	Banjo	TV movie, recording of stage production
2004	Curb Your Enthusiasm	Himself	1 episode
2000-2007	The Sopranos	Dr. Ira Fried	5 episodes
2010	Damages	Dr. Maurice Samuels	1 episode
2012	Smash	Ralph Masius	3 episodes
2014	Live from Lincoln Center	Efram	1 episode, Recording of stage production of The Nance

=== Theatre ===
Year	Title	Role	Notes
1967	Fiddler on the Roof	Mendel	National Tour
1970	Minnie's Boys	Julius "Groucho" Marx	Broadway
1970	The Happiness Cage	Reese	Joseph Papp Public Theater
1972	The Sunshine Boys	Ben Silverman	Broadway
1974	Candide	Dr. Pangloss/Governor/Host/Sage/Voltaire	Broadway
1985	The Odd Couple	Manalo Costazuelo	Broadway
1986	Olympus on My Mind	Sosia	Lamb's Theater
1987	One Two Three Four Five		New York City Center, Stage II
1989	S.J. Perelman in Person	S.J. Perelman	Cherry Lane Theatre
1991	The My House Play	Ernie Battaglia	WPA Theatre
1992	Guys and Dolls	Nathan Detroit	National Tour
1993	Laughter on the 23rd Floor	Milt	Broadway
1996	A Funny Thing Happened on the Way to the Forum	Senex	Broadway
1997	The American Clock	Moe/Sherriff	Peter Norton Space
1998	Mizlansky/Zilinsky or "Schmucks"	Sam Zilinsky	New York City Center, Stage I
1999	Epic Proportions	D.W. Dewitt	
1999	Do Re Mi	Brains Berman	New York City Center, Encores!
2000	The Man Who Came to Dinner	Banjo	
2000	Wonderful Town	Appopolous	New York City Center, Encores!
2001	45 Seconds From Broadway	Mickey Fox	
2003	The Producers	Max Bialystock	National Tour and Broadway
2006	Of Thee I Sing	Louis Lippman	New York City Center, Encores!
2007	Hello, Dolly!	Horace Vandergelder	St. Louis MUNY
2011	The People in the Picture	Avram Krinsky	Broadway
2012	Fiddler on the Roof	Tevye	Pittsburgh Civic Light Opera
2012	Checkers	Murray Chotiner	Vineyard Theatre
2013	The Nance	Efram	Broadway
2014	Little Me	Bennie Buchsbaum	New York City Center, Encores!
2015	Fish in the Dark	Stewie Drexel	Broadway
2016	The Front Page	Endicott	Broadway
2018	Hello, Dolly!	Horace Vandergelder	National Tour
2019	Let 'em Eat Cake	Louis Lippman	Carnegie Hall Concert
2022	Death of a Salesman	Willy Loman	Flint Reperatory Theatre
