= Al Shean =

German-American comedian (1868-1949)

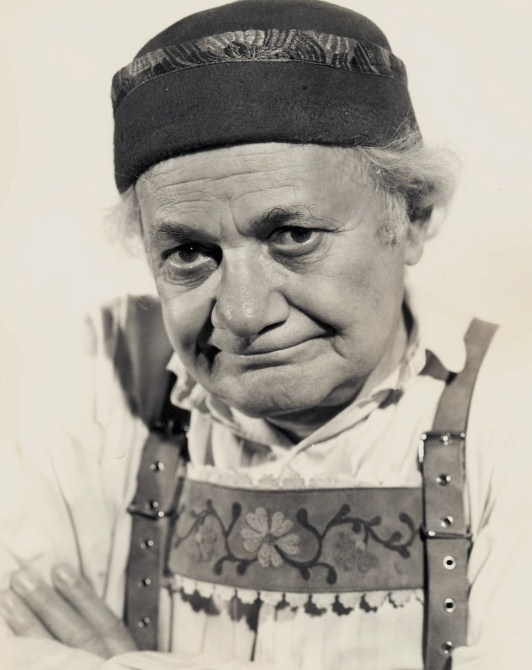
- Shean in The Blue Bird (1940 film)
- Born: Abraham Elieser Adolph Schönberg; May 12, 1868; Dornum, Province of Hanover, Kingdom of Prussia, North German Confederation
- Died: August 12, 1949 (aged 81); New York City, U.S.
- Other names: Adolf Schönberg; Alfred Schönberg; Albert Schönberg
- Occupations: Comedian, vaudevillian
- Years active: 1912–1944
- Spouse: Johanna Davidson
- Children: 1
- Relatives: Minnie Schönberg (sister); Marx Brothers (nephews)

Abraham Elieser Adolph Schönberg (May 12, 1868 – August 12, 1949), known as Al Shean, was a German-born American comedian and vaudeville performer. Other sources give his birth name variously as Adolf Schönberg, Albert Schönberg, or Alfred Schönberg. He is most remembered for being half of the vaudeville team Gallagher and Shean, and as the uncle of the Marx Brothers (Leonard Joseph "Chico" Marx, Adolph (Arthur) "Harpo" Marx, Julius Henry "Groucho" Marx, Milton "Gummo" Marx and Herbert Manfred "Zeppo" Marx).

== Biography ==
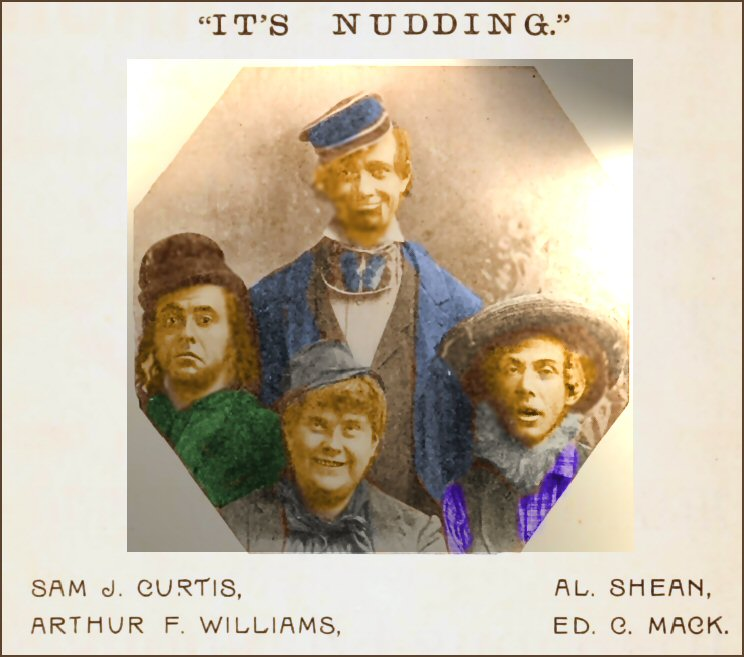
Al Shean, Sam J. Curtis, Arthur F. Williams, Ed C. Mack – The Original Manhattan Comedy Four in "It's Nudding", 1898–99

Shean was born in Dornum, Kingdom of Prussia, on May 12, 1868, the son of Fanny and Levi or Louis Schoenberg. His father was a magician. His sister, Minnie, married Sam "Frenchie" Marx; their sons would become known as the Marx Brothers.

After making a name for himself in vaudeville, Shean teamed up with Edward Gallagher to create the act Gallagher and Shean. While their act became very successful, the two men reportedly came to dislike each other. After their act's final performance in 1925, Shean went on to perform solo in eight Broadway shows, even playing the title character in Father Malachy's Miracle.

Shean also made some film appearances: as the piano player, known as "The Professor" in San Francisco (1936), as grandfather in The Blue Bird (1940), as a priest in Hitler's Madman (1943), and in some three dozen other films. He and Gallagher also made an early sound film at the Theodore Case studio in Auburn, New York, in 1925. Just a few fragments of the duo's only screen appearance together are known to exist.

Shean died on August 12, 1949.

== Legacy ==
Shean's son, also named Al Shean, worked on The Rocky and Bullwinkle Show.

Shean is reputed to have written the Marx Brothers' first (moderately) successful vaudeville sketch on butcher paper at Minnie and Frenchie's kitchen table one night while he was visiting.

== Filmography ==
Year	Title	Role	Notes
1934	Music in the Air	Dr. Walter Lessing	Film debut
1935	Traveling Saleslady	Schmidt	
1935	Page Miss Glory	Mr. Hamburgher	
1935	Sweet Music	Sigmund Selzer	
1936	The King Steps Out	Ballet Master	Uncredited
1936	San Francisco	The Professor	
1937	The Road Back	Markheim	
1937	Live, Love and Learn	Professor Fraum	
1937	52nd Street	Klauber	
1937	The Prisoner of Zenda	Orchestra Leader	Uncredited
1937	Rosalie	Herman Schmidt	Uncredited
1938	Too Hot to Handle	Gumpert	Uncredited
1938	The Great Waltz	Cellist	Uncredited
1939	Broadway Serenade	Herman	
1940	The Blue Bird	Grandpa Tyl	
1941	Ziegfeld Girl	Al	
1943	Hitler's Madman	Father Cemlanek	
1943	Crime Doctor	Dave - Convict	Uncredited
1944	Atlantic City	Himself	Final film

== See also ==
- Gallagher and Shean
