= Arthur Marx =

American writer (1921–2011)

- Publicity Photo of Arthur Marx
- Born: Arthur Julius Marx; July 21, 1921; New York City, U.S.
- Died: April 14, 2011 (aged 89); Los Angeles, California, U.S.
- Occupations: Writer, tennis player
- Spouses: Irene Kahn (1943–1960) Lois Gilbert (m. 1963)
- Children: 2
- Parent(s): Groucho Marx; Ruth Johnson
- Relatives: Miriam Marx (sister); Melinda Marx (half-sister)

Arthur Julius Marx (July 21, 1921 – April 14, 2011) was an American writer, the son of entertainer Groucho Marx and his first wife, Ruth Johnson.

== Early life ==
He was named after Groucho's brother who went by the alternative stage name Harpo.

Marx spent his early years accompanying his father around vaudeville circuits in the United States and abroad. When he was 10, the family moved to Southern California, where the Marx Brothers continued their film careers.

== Tennis ==
Marx was a nationally ranked tennis player before he was 18. While he was attending the University of Southern California, he won the National Freshman Intercollegiate Tennis title at Montclair, New Jersey.

At the Cincinnati Open, Marx made two appearances, amassed a 8-2 singles record, and reached the singles final in 1940 before falling to Bobby Riggs. To reach the final, Marx knocked off future International Tennis Hall of Fame member John Doeg in the round of 16, Frank Froehling Jr. in the quarterfinals, and Gardner Larned in the semifinals. Riggs had blown through his competition to reach the final, and Marx gave him his toughest test of the tournament, stretching the future Hall of Famer to five sets before falling, 11–9, 6–2, 4–6, 6–8, 6–1.

== War service ==
Marx spent four years in the United States Coast Guard during World War II serving in the South Pacific. He was assigned to the Coast Guard–crewed Army Marine Ship Repair Ship Duluth, which embarked an Army Marine Ship Repair Company for the repair work. Marx, a Yeoman, was aboard when the ship departed San Francisco on August 21, 1944, for Finschhafen, arriving September 24, and then arriving at Hollandia in New Guinea in early October to await departure for the invasion of the Philippines. After a very slow convoy, the ship arrived October 23, three days after the landing at Leyte. Marx was hospitalized at Tacloban for malaria; and, when discharged, was assigned to form and be master of ceremonies of an amateur show providing entertainment for those in rear areas passed over by U.S.O. shows. Marx wrote about this experience in his book Son of Groucho.

== Literary, radio, and TV career ==
After the war he worked as an advertising copywriter, a radio gag man for Milton Berle, and a writer of Hollywood movies (including four for Bob Hope), Broadway plays and TV scripts for such hit shows as My Three Sons, All in the Family, and Alice. He and his collaborator, Robert Fisher, were head writers for Alice and wrote 40 episodes of that show. They also wrote for the short-lived situation comedy The Good Guys, and they wrote nine episodes of The Paul Lynde Show and four episodes of the short-lived Life with Lucy. Marx was also co-creator of the TV series Mickey starring Mickey Rooney.

Marx wrote both fiction (often humorous) and non-fiction (often show-business related) pieces for magazines throughout his career. Along with Fisher, he co-authored the play The Impossible Years, which ran for three seasons on Broadway and starred Alan King, and Minnie's Boys, a musical about the Marx Brothers' vaudeville years that starred Shelley Winters. They also wrote My Daughter's Rated X, which won the Straw Hat award for best new comedy on the summer stock circuit, and Groucho: A Life in Revue, which was nominated for a New York Outer Critics Circle award for best play and London's Laurence Olivier Award for Comedy Production of the Year. Other plays included The Chic Life and Hello, My Name Is... Marx was planning a revival of Minnie's Boys to be co-authored by Michael R. Crider shortly before Marx's death in 2011.

Marx also wrote over a dozen books, including The Ordeal of Willie Brown (1951) a humorous fictionalization of his tennis years, and Not as a Crocodile (1958) a collection of family oriented humor essays. His books also included Goldwyn: A Biography of the Man Behind the Myth (1976), Red Skelton: An Unauthorized Biography (1979), The Nine Lives of Mickey Rooney (1986), The Secret Life of Bob Hope: An Unauthorized Biography (1993) and the tennis-themed murder mystery Set to Kill (both 1993). His next novel, Tulip (2004) was a thriller-mystery and it was followed in 2008 by Lust for Death, a roman à clef about a Bob Hope-like character named Jack Faith. His 1974 book on Dean Martin and Jerry Lewis entitled Everybody Loves Somebody Sometime (Especially Himself) was adapted into the 2002 made-for-television movie Martin and Lewis.

Marx also wrote several books featuring different takes on his relationship with his father, including Life with Groucho (1954), Son of Groucho (1973), a reworking and update of the 1954 volume renamed My Life With Groucho: A Son's Eye View (1992), and Arthur Marx’s Groucho: A Photographic Journey (2001). Marx wrote the foreword to Michael R. Crider's 2007 tome, The Guy's Guide to Dating, Getting Hitched and the First Year of Marriage, a humorous look at relationships.

== Personal life ==
Marx wrote in Son of Groucho that while he himself was married to his first wife Irene, he had an affair with her sister-in-law Lois Kahn (then married to Irene's brother Donald), whom he later married after divorcing Irene.
