= Bill Marx (pianist) =

American pianist, arranger, and composer (born 1937)

- Born: William Woollcott Marx; January 8, 1937 (age 89)
- Occupations: pianist, arranger, and composer

William Woollcott Marx (born January 8, 1937) is an American pianist, arranger, and composer. He is the adopted son of actors Harpo Marx and Susan Fleming.

== Early years ==
Marx was placed in the Children's Home Society in Los Angeles by his birth parents when he was eight months old, and four months later he was adopted by Harpo Marx and his wife, Susan Fleming. He attended the Juilliard School, where he studied composition. He studied with composer Mario Castelnuovo-Tedesco. He began working in entertainment when he was 12 years old, when he was put in charge of his father's props for shows, including his harp. At 16, he became the arranger and musical conductor for his father.

== Composing and arranging ==
Marx's compositions include concertos for alto saxophone, flute, harp, piano, and violin. He also composed symphonies and scores for films, including the score for the film Weekend Pass (1984).

Marx transcribed music that his father composed, because the elder Marx did not read music. The two worked together on two albums that Harpo recorded in the early 1960s. He also composed and arranged for recording artists in both jazz and popular music.

In 1961, Marx signed with Vee-Jay Records. His projects there included arranging cover versions of music for four albums by the Castaway Strings. In 1967, he began writing music for commercials.

In the 1970s, he composed for several low-budget horror movies, including Scream Blacula Scream, Terror at Red Wolf Inn, and Count Yorga, Vampire. For these projects, he often collaborated with lyricist Marilyn Lovell. He continued his work on films outside the horror genre throughout the 1980s, such as arranging music for John Cassavetes' Big Trouble.

== Performing and recording ==
As a performer, Marx has played in jazz clubs, lounges, and theaters. In the late 1980s, Marx and harpist Carrol McLaughlin toured the United States, giving performances and promoting Harpo Speaks, his father's autobiography. Their concerts featured "exact renditions of songs that Harpo played" and included a segment in which they dressed as Harpo and Chico Marx. They also recorded an album, From Harpo With Love. The duo's schedule for one spring included 42 venues in 21 states over a seven-week span.

== Recognition ==
In the early 1990s, Los Angeles magazine named Marx the most popular lounge pianist in that city. In 2002, he received a star at 265 S. Palm Canyon Drive on the Palm Springs Walk of Stars. As of December 2019, Marx was still playing as a lounge pianist in and around Palm Springs and Rancho Mirage.

== Works ==
- Son of Harpo Speaks!. Milwaukee, WI: Applause Theatre & Cinema Books. 2011. ISBN 978-1-55783-790-5. OCLC 1280769875 – via Internet Archive.
