= Miriam Marx =

Daughter of Groucho Marx (1927–2017)

- Born: May 19, 1927; New York City, U.S.
- Died: June 29, 2017 (aged 90); Capistrano Beach, California, U.S.
- Other name: Miriam Allen
- Occupations: Writer, memoirist
- Parent(s): Groucho Marx; Ruth Johnson
- Relatives: Arthur Marx (brother); Melinda Marx (paternal half-sister)

Miriam Marx Allen (May 19, 1927 – June 29, 2017) was the daughter of Groucho Marx and his first wife, Ruth Johnson.

== Biography ==
Marx was born in Manhattan on May 19, 1927. She studied for a time at Bennington College in Vermont. But after being expelled for alcohol-related infractions three months before graduating, she worked as a writer at Mademoiselle Magazine. She later worked on her father's quiz show, You Bet Your Life. She also appeared in several Marx Brothers documentaries.

In her 1992 book, Love Groucho: Letters from Groucho Marx to His Daughter Miriam, she detailed her difficult relationship with Groucho, her battle against addictive substances, and her eventual reconciliation with her father. She died June 29, 2017, in Capistrano Beach, California, at the age of 90. Her elder brother, Arthur Marx, died in 2011. Her marriage to Gorden Allen, whom she met at Menninger Clinic while undergoing treatment for alcoholism, ended in divorce.

== Bibliography ==
- Marx, Miriam. Love Groucho: Letters from Groucho Marx to His Daughter Miriam. Faber & Faber, 1992; ISBN 0-571-12915-3.
