= James Porteous =

Scottish-American inventor

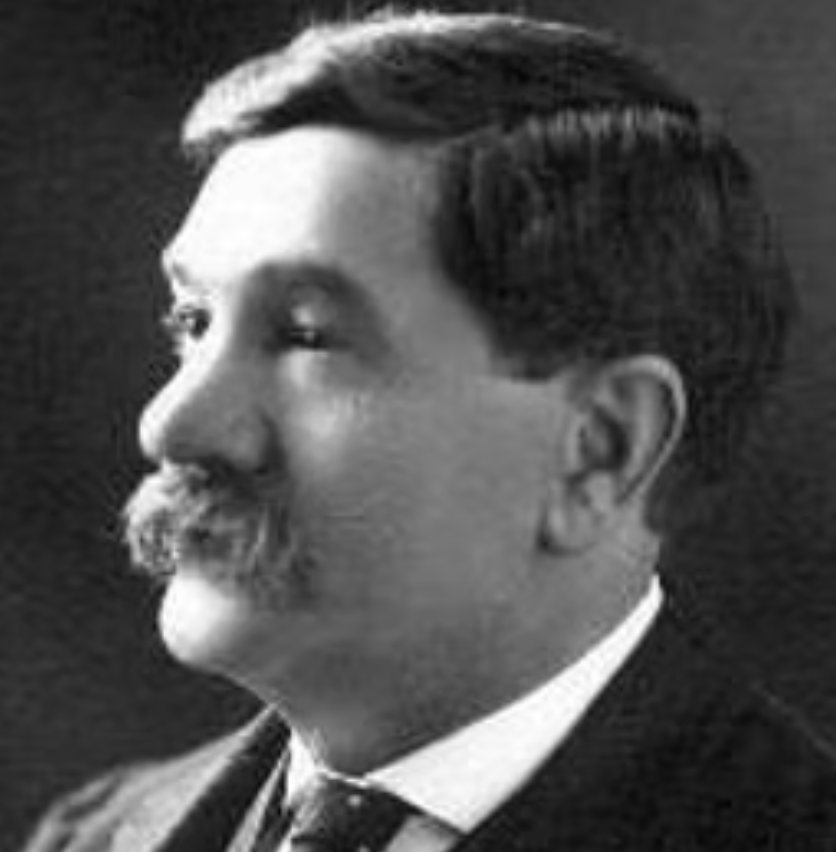
- Portrait of Porteous, c. 1900
- Born: 1848; Haddington, Scotland
- Died: 1922 (aged 73–74); Fresno, California, U.S.
- Occupations: Inventor; wainwright
- Known for: Fresno scraper

James Porteous (1848 – 1922) was a Scottish-American inventor and wainwright, renowned for devising the Fresno scraper.

== Biography ==
James Porteous was born in Haddington, East Lothian, Scotland. His father, William Porteous, had been a wheelwright and blacksmith who built and repaired carriages, wagons and farm equipment. After learning his basic skills, James Porteous emigrated to the United States in 1873, at the age of 25, and settled in Santa Barbara, California. In 1877, he moved to Fresno and established a wagon shop, where he prospered, manufacturing carriages and heavy wagons.

Having worked with farmers, Porteous recognised the dependence of the San Joaquin Valley on irrigation and the requirement for a more efficient means of constructing canals and ditches in the sandy soil, and he went about the task of devising an earth moving scraper for that purpose.

Porteous invented an improvement on the simple buckboard, a horse-drawn earth scraper, and refined his Buck Scraper, as he first called it, through several design improvements. His ideas, combined with those of fellow-inventors William Deidrick, Frank Dusy, and Abijah McCall, all of Selma, California led to the Fresno scraper (1883). Porteous purchased patents held by Deidrick and jointly by partners Dusy and McCall as he perfected his machine. The basic design forms the basis of most modern earth moving scrapers, having the ability to not only scrape and move a quantity of soil, but also to discharge it at a controlled depth, thus quadrupling the volume which could be handled manually.

The blade scooped up the soil, instead of merely pushing it along, and ran along a C-shaped bowl which could be adjusted in order to alter the angle of the bucket to the ground, so that the dirt could be deposited in low spots. This design was so revolutionary and economical that it has influenced the design of modern bulldozer blades and earth-movers to this day.

Porteous formed the Fresno Agricultural Works, which between 1884 and 1910 produced thousands of Fresno scrapers. The machines were used in agriculture and land leveling, as well as road and railroad grading and the general construction industry. They played a vital role in the construction of the Panama Canal and later served the US Army in World War I.

It was one of the most important agricultural and civil engineering machines ever made. In 1991 the Fresno scraper was designated as an International Historic Engineering Landmark by the American Society of Mechanical Engineers. It was featured prominently in the Fresno Metropolitan Museum.
