= Benighted (disambiguation) =

Benighted is a somewhat old-fashioned English word that means turned into night, or into darkness or evil.

Benighted may also refer to:

- Benighted, a French death metal band
- Benighted (album), an album by the French band
- Benighted (novel), by J. B. Priestley, adapted into the 1932 film The Old Dark House
- "Benighted", a song from heavy metal band Opeth's album Still Life
