= The Old Dark House (1963 film) =

1963 British-American film by William Castle

- US film poster
- Directed by: William Castle
- Screenplay by: Robert Dillon
- Based on: Benighted; 1928 novel by J. B. Priestley
- Produced by: Anthony Hinds
- Starring: Tom Poston; Robert Morley; Janette Scott; Joyce Grenfell
- Cinematography: Arthur Grant
- Edited by: James Needs
- Music by: Benjamin Frankel
- Production companies: William Castle Productions; Hammer Film Productions
- Distributed by: BLC (UK); Columbia Pictures (US)
- Release dates: 31 October 1963 (U.S.); July 1966 (UK)
- Running time: 86 minutes (US); 77 minutes (UK)
- Countries: United Kingdom; United States
- Language: English

The Old Dark House is a 1963 comedy horror film directed by William Castle for Hammer Films. A remake of Universal's 1932 film of the same name directed by James Whale, the film is based on the 1927 novel by J. B. Priestley originally published under the name Benighted, and the new screenplay was written by Robert Dillon. The film was made in 1962, but was only distributed in the U.S. in 1963. It was not distributed in England until 1966. The opening title art was drawn by legendary macabre cartoonist Charles Addams, whose signature is painted by a hairy hand.

The film is set in Dartmoor, Devon. A London salesman plans to visit his roommate and his roommate's family at an old mansion, but arrives shortly after the roommate's death. He is invited to spend the night with the family, but the family members are then killed one by one. They were all heirs to the family estate, and one family member wants to be the sole surviving heir. They resort to familicide to get their inheritance.

== Plot ==
Tom Penderel, an American car salesman in London, delivers a car to an old mansion on Dartmoor for his eccentric roommate Casper Femm. The car is damaged by a falling statue in a raging storm. Tom enters the house, and finds that his roommate Casper is dead. Tom is invited to stay at the house by members of Casper's family, including his twin brother Jasper, his cousins, the demure young Cecily and the seductive Morgana, and his Uncle Potiphar, who has been building an ark in anticipation of another great flood.

Each of the relatives is required to return to the dilapidated mansion before midnight each evening or forfeit his share of the family fortune. During the night, one of the Femm family dies every hour. First Agatha Femm, Casper's mother, is discovered with her knitting needles stuck in her neck. Casper's twin brother, Jasper, is the next victim, followed by Roderick, the head of the family.

Tom stumbles upon the fact that the killer is a woman, and he suspects Morgana, but discovers that Cecily is guilty just before she confesses, explaining that she wanted the entire family estate. Cecily runs from the house, and Tom discovers that she has placed time bombs in all of the clocks in the house. Racing against time, he frantically defuses each of the bombs. With moments to spare, he hurls the last bomb out of the window, and it explodes at Cecily's feet.

== Cast ==
- Tom Poston as Tom Penderel
- Robert Morley as Roderick Femm
- Janette Scott as Cecily Femm
- Joyce Grenfell as Agatha Femm
- Mervyn Johns as Potiphar Femm
- Fenella Fielding as Morgana Femm
- Peter Bull as Caspar/Jasper Femm
- Danny Green as Morgan Femm
- John Harvey as Club Receptionist
- Amy Dalby as Gambler (uncredited)

== Reception ==
The remake has not been as well received by modern critics as the original film. Craig Butler of the film database Allmovie wrote of the 1963 film, that "When compared with the James Whale original upon which it is based, this remake of The Old Dark House is pretty sorry stuff." Halliwell's Film and Video Guide 2000 describes this film as "a travesty which has nothing to do with the 1932 film and possesses no merit of its own. The cast is left floundering". The Hammer Story: The Authorised History of Hammer Films called it "one of the oddest pictures [Hammer Film Productions] ever made", but "strangely endearing".

== Home media ==
In the US, the film was originally released by Sony Pictures on an anamorphic 1.85 aspect ratio DVD, with the only extra being the original theatrical trailer. It was later paired on disc with Mr. Sardonicus and included in two separate William Castle box sets. The original disc was later reissued as a DVD-R burn-on demand release from Sony Pictures Choice Collection. The film has also been released on DVD in Spain, retitled La vieja casa oscura, both separately and as part of a William Castle box set.

== See also ==
- List of American films of 1963
