= Frank Dusy =

Frank Dusy (December 17, 1837 – November 9, 1898) was a Canadian-born American rancher, early business leader of Selma, California, and a co-inventor of the Fresno Scraper, the basis of most modern earth-moving machinery.

On June 16, 1885, Dusy and his partner Abijah McCall were issued U.S. Patent 320,055, for their improvement on the Buck Scraper, invented by James Porteous of Fresno, California. Porteous, originally a wagon builder, purchased their patent and one held by William Deidrick as he perfected his machine. Dusy was also among the original investors in the Fresno Republican newspaper, which was eventually acquired by and combined with the Fresno Bee.

He is the namesake of the Dusy Basin, a high alpine basin located in Kings Canyon National Park; and Dusy Branch Meadow, a middle fork of Kings River north of the Palisades.
