= What Happened to Harkness? =

1934 film by Milton Rosmer

- Directed by: Milton Rosmer
- Written by: Rowland Brown; Brock Williams
- Produced by: Irving Asher
- Starring: Robert Hale; James Finlayson; Brember Wills
- Cinematography: Basil Emmott
- Production company: Warner Brothers
- Distributed by: First National Film Distributors
- Release date: 17 August 1934
- Running time: 53 minutes
- Country: United Kingdom
- Language: English

What Happened to Harkness? is a 1934 British comedy film directed by Milton Rosmer and starring Robert Hale, James Finlayson and Brember Wills. It was made at Teddington Studios.

== Premise ==
The murder of a miser is investigated by a village policeman.

== Cast ==
- Robert Hale as Sergeant McCabe
- James Finlayson as Police Constable Gallun
- Brember Wills as Bernard Harkness
- John Turnbull as Inspector Marlow
- Clare Harris as Mrs. Millett
- Wally Patch as Bullett
- Morland Graham as Billy
- Veronica Brady as Mrs. Bullett
- Aubrey Mallalieu as Dr. Powin
- Kathleen Kelly as Pat

== Bibliography ==
- Low, Rachael. Filmmaking in 1930s Britain. George Allen & Unwin, 1985.
- Wood, Linda. British Films, 1927-1939. British Film Institute, 1986.
