= Arthur Sheekman =

American screenwriter

- Born: February 5, 1901; Chicago, Illinois, U.S.
- Died: January 12, 1978 (aged 76); Santa Monica, California, U.S.
- Occupation: Writer
- Spouse: Gloria Stuart (m. 1934)
- Children: Sylvia Vaughn Thompson

Arthur Sheekman (February 5, 1901 – January 12, 1978) was an American theater and movie critic, columnist, playwright, and editor—but best known for his writing for the screen. His specialty was light comedy. Groucho Marx called him "The Fastest Wit in the West."

== Early life (1901–1926) ==
Arthur Sheekman was born February 5, 1901, in Chicago, Illinois. His parents, Nettie Green Sheekman and Charles Grover Sheekman, were Jewish immigrants from Rostov-on-Don, Russia. Sheekman was the middle child of three, coming between Edith (who became a teacher) and Harvey (an engineer). In Sheekman's early years, the family lived in St. Paul, Minnesota, where their father owned a bar. As Charlie Sheekman wasn't much of a provider, the children had to scramble to help support their family. Sheekman got his first job at twelve, working after school and on weekends at the St. Paul Public Library stacking books. He worked at the library until he got a job as a cub reporter on the St. Paul Daily News—a letter of recommendation from Librarian William Dawson Johnston to the Daily News City Editor gave him the entrée. Sheekman rose to become the paper's theater and movie critic, writing his column, "The Voice Off-Stage". Wanting to go to college, Sheekman enrolled at the University of Minnesota but found he could not manage both his job and his course work and had to withdraw.

In 1926, Sheekman is rumored to have filled in for a colleague's place on a journalist's trip to the Sesquicentennial International Exposition in Philadelphia. On a sight-seeing tour with fellow newspapermen, the guide was pointing out a replica of the Liberty Bell...a replica of Betsy Ross's flag...a replica of the elm tree where William Penn stood...a replica of—when Sheekman interrupted, "Say, could you show us a replica of a men's room?" When the editor of the Chicago Journal stopped laughing, he offered Sheekman three times the salary he was getting at the Daily News. That was how Sheekman got back to his native Chicago.

On the Chicago Journal, Sheekman continued writing about the movies and Hollywood in his column, "Short Shot and Close-Up". Then he was awarded the noteworthy space, "A Little About Everything," a column previously occupied by humorists Bert Leston Taylor, Finley Peter Dunne, and Franklin P. Adams. In a Journal handout promoting the column, Florenz Ziegfeld is quoted as wiring from New York, "Please send me back numbers of Chicago Daily Journal containing Arthur Sheekman's column, which I find vastly entertaining." "A leading merchant of Chicago...remarked, "I like his column because he is a cynic without scorn, and a wit without malice." Finally, Sheekman moved to Chicago's Daily Times where his column "Ahead of the Times" was a "A Daily Potpourri of Wit and Verse.".

== Groucho Marx (1926–1977) ==
Groucho Marx played a major role in Sheekman's life. The two men met in the fall of 1926 when The Marx Brothers came to Chicago on tour in their musical play, The Cocoanuts. When Sheekman interviewed them for his column, the brothers told him that Groucho, Harpo and Chico were going "... to produce a film called The Marx Brothers at Yale." Sheekman commented, "It was inevitable of course that Mrs. Marx's boys should be sought after as film comedians; for there are few stage buffoons who come within blocks of their talents for comedic pantomime ..." (Rather than The Marx Brothers at Yale that turned Mrs. Marx's boys into legendary film comedians, it was The Cocoanuts, released in August 1929.) Then again after the Broadway run of their musical play, Animal Crackers (October 1928 – April 1929), the brothers again came to Chicago on tour. Sheekman gave Groucho his column's space, advising his readers: "On Tuesday, Mr. Groucho Marx, the comedian, will be guest conductor of this column at no increase in prices. Mr. Marx is the man who said (and is still saying in Animal Crackers): 'It would be a happier world for children if parents ate the spinach themselves.'"

The following year, the movie version of Animal Crackers was released. Groucho wanted Sheekman to come to Hollywood and write for The Boys (as they called themselves). Instead, with Sheekman in Chicago and The Boys in Los Angeles, Sheekman did write for one of them. In 1929, a book titled Beds was serialized in the magazine, College Humor, then the following year was published in book form. Beds bore Groucho Marx's name as author but it was Arthur Sheekman who wrote it.

Early in 1931, Sheekman accepted Groucho's invitation and moved west to work on Monkey Business—his credit on that first picture was "Dialog by Arthur Sheekman." Next he worked on Horse Feathers but just with Groucho (and was uncredited). Sheekman makes an unscripted appearance in the movie as a sports writer in the press box.

At this point in his career, Sheekman began a collaboration (and lasting friendship) with Nat Perrin. Perrin was also new at writing comedy for the screen, but their chemistry clicked. In the next five years, Sheekman and Perrin came up with two original stories (Kid Millions, Pigskin Parade), wrote four screenplays—two for Shirley Temple, one for Eddie Cantor, (Kid Millions, Rose of the Rancho, Dimples, Stowaway) and contributed additional dialog/material to movies for The Marx Brothers and Eddie Cantor (Duck Soup, Roman Scandals). They also worked on the Groucho-Chico radio series Flywheel, Shyster and Flywheel. In 1937, Sheekman and Perrin amicably agreed it was time to move on.

Through the years, Groucho and Sheekman were closest friends. The two men had much in common. They had the same wry fly irreverent sense of humor, grew up struggling to support their families, were non-religious Jews with a liberal bent (Marx was a founding member of the Screen Actors Guild and Sheekman was a founding member of the Screen Writers Guild), loved to read and appreciated beautiful women. When Groucho was asked to put together a collection of his letters for Simon & Schuster, he asked Sheekman to do it for him. The Groucho Letters: Letters to and from Groucho Marx was published in 1967. Sheekman wrote a Preface to the book but requested his name not be noted as editor.

== Non-Marxian works (1933–1961) ==
Sheekman met his wife, actress Gloria Stuart, when visiting the set of the Eddie Cantor musical he was working on, Roman Scandals. Stuart was one of the stars. They married in August the following year and their daughter, Sylvia, was born in June 1935.

In 1939, when both their contracts with studios were up, the Sheekmans took a trip around the world. When they landed in New York, they decided to stay. Stuart hoped to work in the theater and Sheekman hoped to write a hit play. In the next three-and-a-half years, Sheekman collaborated on two plays. Mr. Big he wrote with Margaret Shane and Franklin Street he wrote with Ruth and Augustus Goetz. The reviews of Mr. Big were brutal and it closed after seven performances. Franklin Street never made it out of Boston. And although Stuart was in demand for roles in summer stock, she could not get a part on Broadway. In 1943, the Sheekmans returned to Hollywood.

In the next seventeen years, Sheekman added seventeen credits to his name. He developed a reputation for writing skillful adaptations of plays and novels. Most notable are Dear Ruth, Dream Girl, Mr. Music, Call Me Madam and Some Came Running. Call Me Madam was a particular success. Under a headline, "'Madam' Even Better on Screen," Alton Cook wrote, "Scenarist Arthur Sheekman has achieved his good result with small and sly changes along the way, making the humor flow more steadily and giving some of it a sharper edge." The Screen Writers' Guild nominated Call Me Madam as the best written Musical of 1953.

In the 1950s, Sheekman wrote a third play, The Joker, but it failed, too.

Still, in his 28 films, Arthur Sheekman wrote for some of Hollywood's most enduring stars. In addition to The Marx Brothers and Shirley Temple, he created characters for Bing Crosby, Fred Astaire, Judy Garland, Frank Sinatra, Susan Hayward, William Holden, Shirley MacLaine, Alan Ladd, Betty Hutton, Danny Kaye, Anne Baxter, Ray Milland, Ethel Merman, Dean Martin, Eddie Cantor, Debbie Reynolds, and Gloria Stuart.

== Decline and loss (1970–1978) ==
Sheekman suffered a heart attack in the spring of 1960 and his health became a concern. In 1970, his confusion and disorientation were diagnosed as pre-senile dementia. Sheekman had to be cared for in a nursing facility. During the next seven years, Groucho regularly came to see his friend. Gloria Stuart wrote in her 1999 memoir, "The only tender thing I ever heard Groucho say was to my husband on a visit... Leaning down over Arthur's wheelchair he said, "Don't go before I go, Sheek." Sheekman died five months after Groucho on January 12, 1978.

== Filmography ==
- Monkey Business (1931)
- Horse Feathers (1932)
- Duck Soup (1933)
- Roman Scandals (1933)
- Kid Millions (1934)
- Rose of the Rancho (1936)
- Dimples (1936)
- Pigskin Parade (1936)
- Stowaway (1936)
- The King and the Chorus Girl (dialogue and treatment, uncredited, 1937)
- The Gladiator (1938)
- Wonder Man (1945)
- Blue Skies (1946)
- Blaze of Noon (1947)
- Dear Ruth (1947)
- Welcome Stranger (1947)
- The Trouble with Women (1947)
- Saigon (1948)
- Hazard (1948)
- Dream Girl (1948)
- Dear Wife (1949)
- Mr. Music (1950)
- Here Comes the Groom (Uncredited) (1951)
- Young Man With Ideas (1952)
- Call Me Madam (1953)
- Bundle of Joy (1956)
- |Les Girls (Treatment, uncredited) (1957)
- Some Came Running (1958)
- Ada (1961)
- My Three Sons: "Robbie's Honey" (1971)
