= William Deidrick =

American inventor (??–1899)

- Died: 1899; San Francisco, California, U.S.
- Occupations: Inventor; farmer
- Spouse: Alice Vaughan
- Relatives: Gloria Stuart (granddaughter); Frank Finch (grandson); Sylvia Vaughn Thompson (great-granddaughter)

William Thomas Deidrick (died 1899) was an American inventor from Selma, California. He was a co-inventor of the Fresno Scraper, the machine that became the basis of most modern earth-moving equipment. On April 17, 1883, Deidrick received U.S. Patent 275,893 for his horse-drawn scraper, which was a variation on the Buck Scraper, invented by James Porteous of Fresno, California. Porteous, originally a manufacturer of wagons, purchased Deidrick's patent, and also one held jointly by Frank Dusy and Abijah McCall as he perfected the machine, an important tool in the building of the Panama Canal, among many other uses. Deidrick is the maternal grandfather of actress and visual artist Gloria Stuart, known for her roles in pre-code films, in addition to her portrayal of "Old Rose" in James Cameron's 1997 epic romance Titanic.

He died in 1899 in San Francisco, reportedly on the same night as his ex-wife, Alice Vaughan.
