= Sylvia Vaughn Thompson =

American writer (born 1935)

- Born: Sylvia Vaughn Sheekman; June 19, 1935 (age 91); Santa Monica, California, U.S.
- Education: University of California, Berkeley; Sorbonne University
- Spouses: Gene Thompson (m. 1955; died 2001); William Park (m. 2011)
- Parents: Arthur Sheekman; Gloria Stuart
- Relatives: Frank Finch (maternal uncle); William Deidrick (maternal great-grandfather)
- Website: https://www.sylviathompsonsblog.com/

Sylvia Vaughn Thompson (born Sylvia Vaughn Sheekman; June 19, 1935) is an American writer, principally about cuisine, the garden, and life in her eighties and nineties. Thompson has written several cookbooks, including Feasts and Friends: Recipes from a Lifetime (1988)—with a foreword by M. F. K. Fisher—and The Kitchen Garden Cookbook (1995).

== Early life and education ==
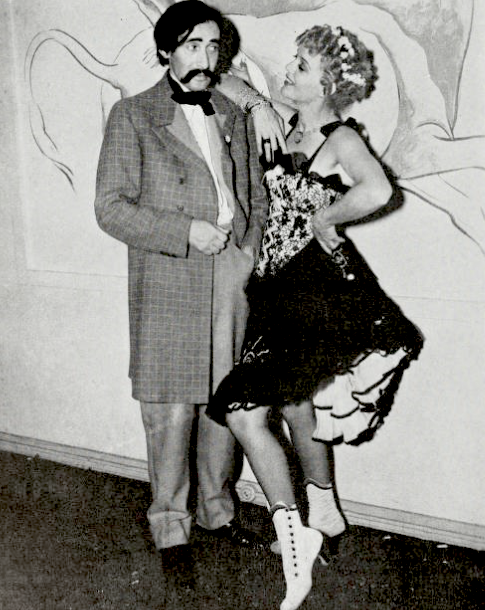
Thompson's parents, Gloria and Arthur, in 1937

The only child of actress and artist Gloria Stuart and screenwriter Arthur Sheekman, Thompson grew up in a nurturing milieu of writers, actors, directors, producers, and artists. For four years (1943–1946), the Sheekmans lived at the legendary Garden of Allah, where Sylvia was the rare child in residence. She was named after Stuart's character Princess Sylvia in Roman Scandals.

Gloria Stuart was widely regarded as brilliantly creative in all she did, and at the age of eight, Sylvia became her mother’s sous-chef for her parents' celebrated dinner parties.

Sylvia Sheekman attended the University of California, Berkeley, and in her sophomore year, the Sorbonne in Paris—after which a summer with her parents in San Michele di Pagana, Italy, continued her lessons in superb cooking.

== Career ==
Marrying in the 1950s, Thompson moved to New York. She wrote food articles for Vogue magazine. In 1963 she published her first cookbook, Economy Gastronomy. The Budget Gourmet followed in 1974. The Washington Post stated that Thompson's early cookbooks "made cooking with next to nothing seem a great, swaggering adventure." However, her 1977 book Woman’s Day Crockery Cuisine was recalled by the publisher because one of the recipes recommended heating an unopened food tin in a manner that in one case caused it to explode.

Thompson is credited as a co-writer of her mother's memoirs, I Just Kept Hoping (1999).

Thompson's Feasts and Friends is part memoir, part cookbook. Thompson recounts food experiences at each stage in her life, offering recipes that reflect the various cultures that contributed to her upbringing, including San Joaquin Valley and Russian. The book was well received; a reviewer wrote that "few food writers can so casually capture the flavor of place — and few are as lucky in the places that have come their way to capture: from a Hollywood childhood to Europe on a shoestring to the good life along the California coast."

== Personal life ==
In 1955, the last day of her junior year at Berkeley, Sylvia married thirty-year-old Gene Thompson — while in Berkeley — who was pursuing a doctorate in English Literature. From age sixteen to eighteen, under the pseudonym Alan Kent, wunderkind Thompson collaborated on popular radio shows for Groucho Marx, Eddie Cantor, and Duffy’s Tavern. For a time the young man lived with Groucho’s family. Marx happened to be Sylvia’s father’s best friend, but Sylvia did not yet meet her future husband until university. The Thompson children — David Oxley Thompson, Dinah Vaughan Sapia, Benjamin Stuart Thompson, and Amanda Greenleaf Whelan — have given Sylvia twelve grandchildren and ten great-grandchildren, several artists and writers among them.

Gene Thompson died in 2001. The next nine years Sylvia, while continuing to write, kept close to her aging widowed mother (Arthur Sheekman died in 1978). Soon after her mother's death in September 2010, she married William Park — a writer and retired professor.
