= The Old Dark House =

1932 comedy horror film by James Whale

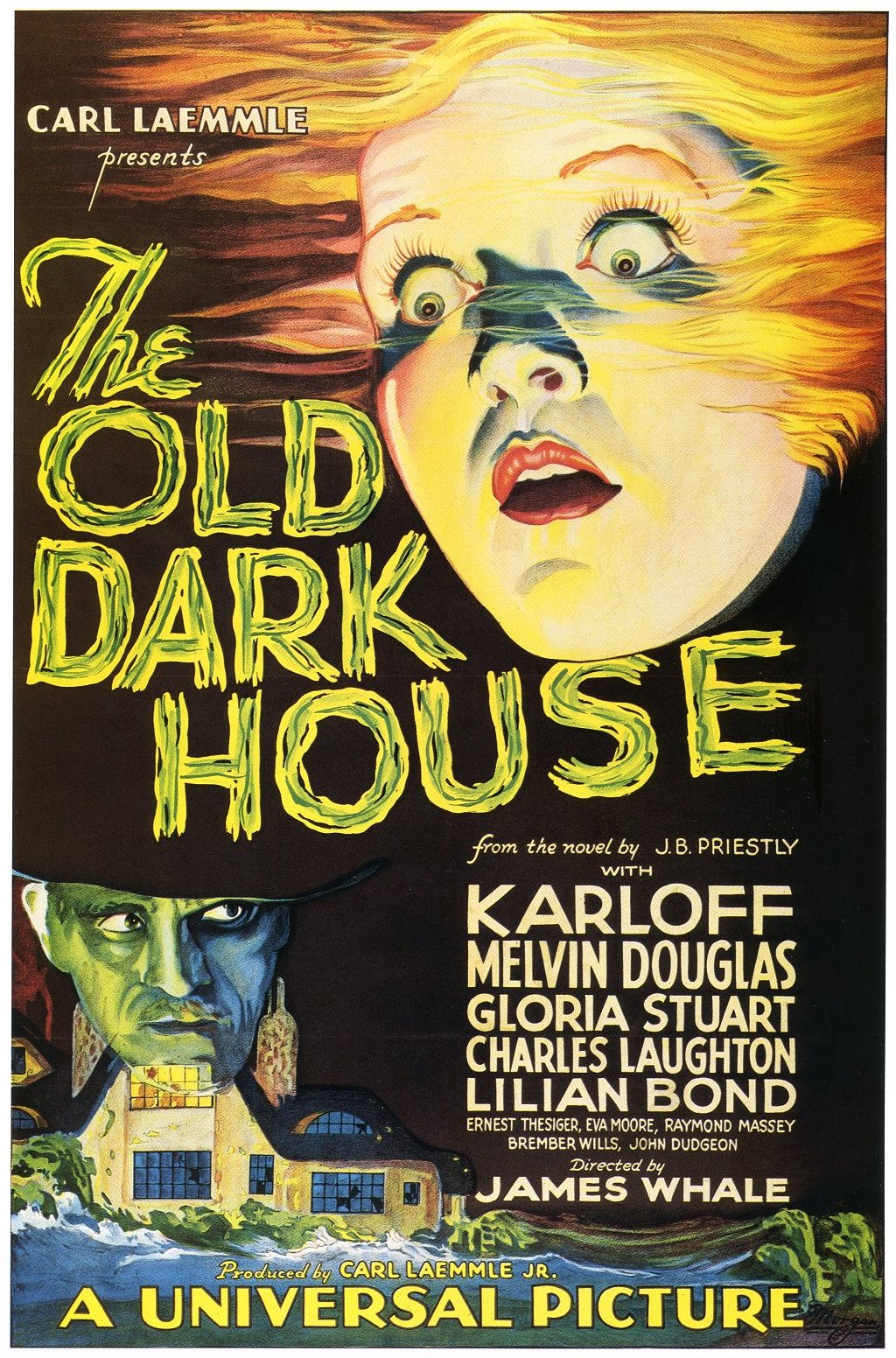
- Theatrical release poster by Karoly Grosz
- Directed by: James Whale
- Written by: Benn W. Levy; R. C. Sherriff (uncredited)
- Based on: Benighted; 1927 novel by J. B. Priestley
- Produced by: Carl Laemmle Jr.
- Starring: Boris Karloff; Melvyn Douglas; Gloria Stuart; Charles Laughton; Lilian Bond; Ernest Thesiger; Eva Moore; Raymond Massey; Brember Wills; Elspeth Dudgeon
- Cinematography: Arthur Edeson
- Edited by: Clarence Kolster
- Music by: David Broekman
- Production company: Universal Pictures
- Distributed by: Universal Pictures
- Release date: October 20, 1932
- Running time: 72 minutes
- Country: United States
- Language: English
- Budget: $250,000

The Old Dark House is a 1932 American pre-Code horror film directed by James Whale. Based on the 1927 novel Benighted by J.B. Priestley, the film features an ensemble cast that includes Boris Karloff, Melvyn Douglas, Gloria Stuart, Charles Laughton, Lilian Bond, Ernest Thesiger, Raymond Massey and Eva Moore. Set in interwar Wales, the film follows five travellers who seek shelter from a violent storm in the decaying country house of the eccentric Femm family.

The adaptation rights to Priestley's novel, a social commentary on contemporary British class structures, were acquired by Universal Pictures at Whale's insistence following the completion of Frankenstein (1931) and during development on The Invisible Man (1933). The screenplay was written by Benn W. Levy, who had previously scripted Waterloo Bridge (1931) for Whale and Universal, with uncredited contributions by The Invisible Man's R. C. Sheriff, and serves as a largely faithful adaptation of the story. Whale was entrusted with selecting the film's largely British cast, several of whose members were theatre colleagues of his with minimal film experience, and would appear in several of his later films.

The Old Dark House failed to match the contemporary critical and commercial success of Whale's other films, and was withdrawn from circulation after Universal lost the rights to Priestley's novel, which was adapted for film again in 1963 by William Castle for Columbia Pictures and Hammer Film Productions. Initially deemed a lost film, Whale's colleague Curtis Harrington eventually succeeded in recovering most of its original elements, which were restored by the George Eastman House. With the re-evaluation of Whale's filmography, The Old Dark House has garnered widespread critical acclaim, and is recognized as both a cult classic and one of the director's most significant works. It was placed at number 71 on a Time Out poll of the best horror films.

== Plot ==
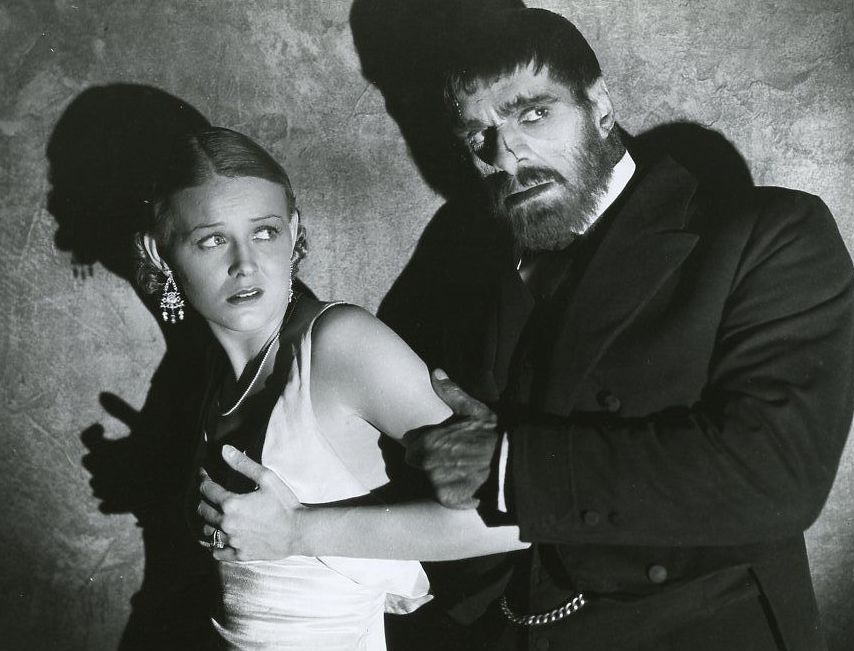
Gloria Stuart and Boris Karloff in the film

Philip Waverton, his wife Margaret and their friend Roger Penderel are lost while driving at night in a heavy storm. They come upon an old house in the Welsh countryside where they receive shelter from Horace Femm and his sister Rebecca. Horace fears that the storm will trap the guests inside. He also warns them that their mute butler Morgan is a dangerous, heavy drinker. As Rebecca escorts Margaret to a bedroom to change clothes, she tells her about the Femm family, which Rebecca says was sinful and godless. She accuses Margaret of being sinful as well. Rebecca reveals that her 102-year-old father, Sir Roderick Femm, still lives in the house.

During dinner, the group are joined by Sir William Porterhouse and a chorus girl with the stage name Gladys DuCane, who also seek refuge from the storm. As the group chats by the fireplace, Gladys reveals her real last name is Perkins. Roger and Gladys go to retrieve some whiskey from his car. The electric lights go out and Rebecca tells Horace to get a lamp from an upstairs landing. Horace is afraid to go upstairs, so Philip goes instead. As he fetches the lamp, he notices a locked room and hears a voice coming from another room. William goes to help Rebecca close a window, leaving Margaret alone. Morgan, now drunk, attacks her and chases her up the stairs to Philip, who is coming down with the lamp. Philip throws the lamp at Morgan, knocking him down the stairs.

Roger and Gladys begin flirting while they drink and smoke. Gladys says her relationship with William is platonic, and suggests she should live with Roger instead. They go back to the house, where they wake up William and tell him about their new romance. Meanwhile, Philip and Margaret go into the room where he heard the voice; they find Roderick Femm there. He warns them about his eldest son, Saul, a crazed pyromaniac kept in the locked room. Philip and Margaret discover that Morgan has let Saul out; they go downstairs to warn the other guests. Morgan comes downstairs and charges at Margaret. Philip and William drag Morgan into the kitchen while Rebecca flees to her bedroom. Roger tells Margaret and Gladys to hide in a closet. Saul comes downstairs and knocks Roger out. Saul steals a burning branch from the fireplace and sets fire to a curtain before Roger awakes. They fight and fall off a landing; Saul is killed and Roger injured. Morgan breaks out of the kitchen and returns to the main room. He frees Margaret and Gladys from the closet before taking Saul's body upstairs.

By morning, the storm has subsided. Saul's attempt at burning the house has caused little damage. Philip and Margaret leave to get an ambulance, while Gladys and William stay behind to tend to Roger's injuries. Upon awakening, Roger asks Gladys to marry him, and she happily kisses him in response.

== Cast ==
- Boris Karloff as Morgan
- Melvyn Douglas as Roger Penderel
- Raymond Massey as Philip Waverton
- Gloria Stuart as Margaret Waverton
- Charles Laughton as Sir William Porterhouse
- Lilian Bond as Gladys DuCane/Perkins
- Ernest Thesiger as Horace Femm
- Eva Moore as Rebecca Femm
- Brember Wills as Saul Femm
- Elspeth Dudgeon as Sir Roderick Femm (credited as "John Dudgeon")

== Production ==
=== Development ===
Universal Studios producer Carl Laemmle Jr. invited screenwriter Benn Levy from England to Universal City after being impressed with Levy's screenplay for Waterloo Bridge (1931), which was also directed by James Whale. Levy was loaned to Paramount Pictures, where he worked on the screenplay for Devil and the Deep (1932). When Levy finished work on the film, he returned to Universal to start work on The Old Dark House. The film is based on the novel Benighted (1927) by J. B. Priestley, about post-World War I disillusionment. It was published in the United States under the same title as the film. Adapted for the screen by R. C. Sherriff and Benn Levy, the motion picture follows the original plot of the book, while adding levels of comedy to the story.

=== Casting ===
Boris Karloff was attached to appear in The Old Dark House as early as January 1932. Gloria Stuart was cast in the film after a negotiation between Universal Pictures and Paramount Pictures, who each wanted to hire the actress for a project; the two studios reportedly agreed to settle the matter with a coin toss conducted by Stuart herself, which resulted in her signing with Universal to play Margaret Waverton in The Old Dark House.

Walter Byron was offered the role of Philip Waverton, but he declined due to scheduling conflicts with the Alan Mowbray production Dinner Is Served; the role was instead given to Raymond Massey.

=== Filming ===
The Old Dark House was shot on a budget of $250,000. Filming began in late April 1932 and was completed by late May, all on the Universal Studios lots in Los Angeles.

=== Producer's note ===
A "producer's note" was placed at the beginning of the film that reads:

Karloff, the mad butler in this production, is the same Karloff who created the part of the mechanical monster in Frankenstein. We explain this to settle all disputes in advance, even though such disputes are a tribute to his great versatility.

== Release ==
The Old Dark House was previewed in early July 1932, with a wide theatrical release beginning on October 20, 1932. It premiered at the Rialto Theatre in New York City on October 27, 1932.

=== Rediscovery ===
In 1957, Universal Studios lost the rights to the original story, and a remake was released in 1963, directed by William Castle and co-produced with Hammer Film Productions. For many years, the original version was considered a lost film and gained a tremendous reputation as one of the pre-eminent gothic horror films. Director Curtis Harrington, a friend of Whale, helped to rediscover The Old Dark House, having repeatedly asked Universal Studios to locate the film negative. Harrington eventually discovered a print of the film in the vaults of Universal in 1968. He persuaded the George Eastman House film archive to finance a new duplicate negative of the poorly kept first reel, and restore the rest of the film.

=== Home media ===
The Old Dark House was released on DVD for the first time by Kino Lorber in 1999.

The Cohen Media Group issued The Old Dark House on Blu-ray in the United States in October 2017, after which Eureka Entertainment released a Blu-ray and DVD set as part of their Masters of Cinema line in 2018. In February 2025, Eureka reissued the film in 4K UHD Blu-ray; this release reinstated the "producer's note" at the beginning of the film, which did not appear on previous Blu-ray releases.

== Reception ==
=== Box office ===
The Old Dark House did good business at the box-office, grossing $24,500 in its first week at the Rialto Theatre, but later suffered through negative word of mouth. It was booked for three weeks at the Rialto, but the audience turn-out dropped to less than half in its second week and the film was pulled after ten days. The film performed better in the United Kingdom, where it broke house records at the Capitol Theatre in London. It was re-issued into theaters in 1939.

=== Critical response ===
In the United States, Variety and The Hollywood Filmograph gave the film negative reviews, with Variety calling it a "somewhat inane picture". All nine of the New York City dailies gave the film positive reviews.

Mordaunt Hall of The New York Times praised the film, stating, "there is a wealth of talent in this production...like Frankenstein, [it] had the advantage of being directed by James Whale, who again proves his ability." The Brooklyn Eagle's Martin Dickstein wrote that the film "offers nothing that is strikingly original" in terms of its premise and horror elements, but commended the cast, Whale's direction, and the film's climax.

=== Modern assessment ===
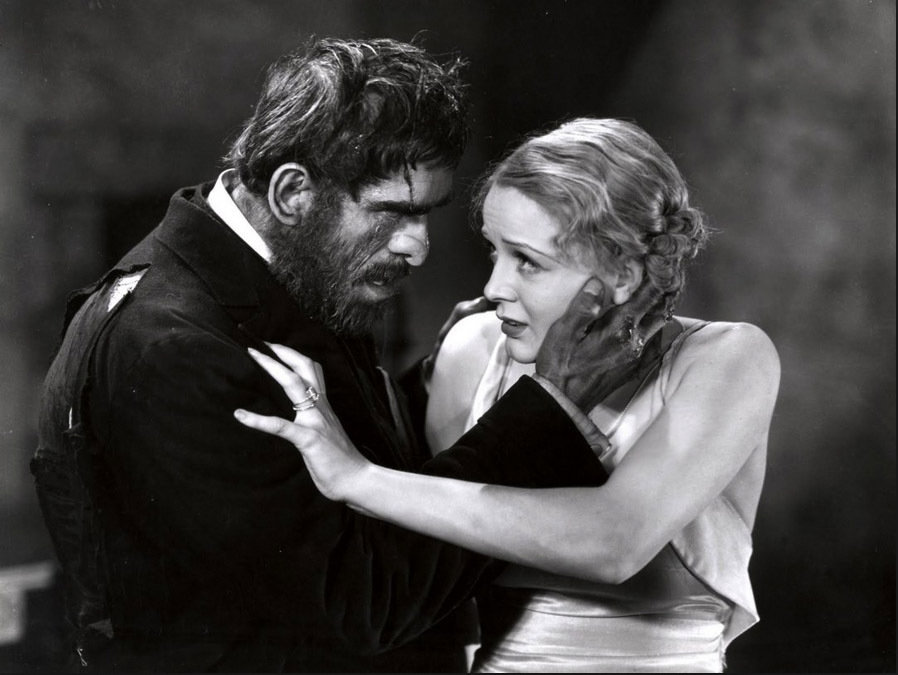
Boris Karloff and Gloria Stuart in the film

Modern reception has been much more favorable than reviews from the time of the film's original release. On the review aggregator website Rotten Tomatoes, 97% of 30 critics' reviews are positive. The website's consensus reads: "A deft blend of well-chosen ingredients, The Old Dark House is a delightfully scary horror comedy that benefits from James Whale's suspenseful direction." Time Out London praised the film; "Whale manages to parody the conventions of the dark house horror genre as he creates them, in which respect the film remains entirely modern." Karl Williams of the film database Allmovie wrote, "by the 1960s [the film had] attained a grail-like status among fans of director James Whale...The Old Dark House came to be reconsidered a cult gem, part of the renewal of interest in Whale's talents many years after his creative peak." Writing for Film Comment in 2017, Michael Sragow deemed the film Whale's "least-seen masterpiece."

In the early 2010s, Time Out conducted a poll of several authors, directors, actors and critics who had worked within the horror genre to determine their top horror films. The Old Dark House placed at number 71 on their top 100 list.

The film also served as an inspiration for The Rocky Horror Picture Show and Thundercrack!.

== See also ==
- List of American films of 1932
- Boris Karloff performances
- List of Gloria Stuart performances
- List of rediscovered films

== Bibliography ==
- Hallenbeck, Bruce G. (2009). Comedy-Horror Films: A Chronological History, 1914–2008. Jefferson, North Carolina: McFarland. ISBN 978-0-7864-1112-2.
- Jacobs, Stephen (2011). Boris Karloff: More Than a Monster. Sheffield, England: Tomahawk Press. ISBN 978-0-955-76704-3.
- Mank, Gregory William (2001). Hollywood Cauldron. Jefferson, North Carolina: McFarland. ISBN 0-7864-3332-9.
- Nollen, Scott Allen (1991). Boris Karloff. Jefferson, North Carolina: McFarland. ISBN 0-89950-580-5.
- Nourmand, Tony; Marsh, Graham, eds. (2004). Horror Poster Art. London, England: Aurum Press Limited. ISBN 1-84513-010-3.
