= Selma, California =

City in California, United States

- City
- City of Selma
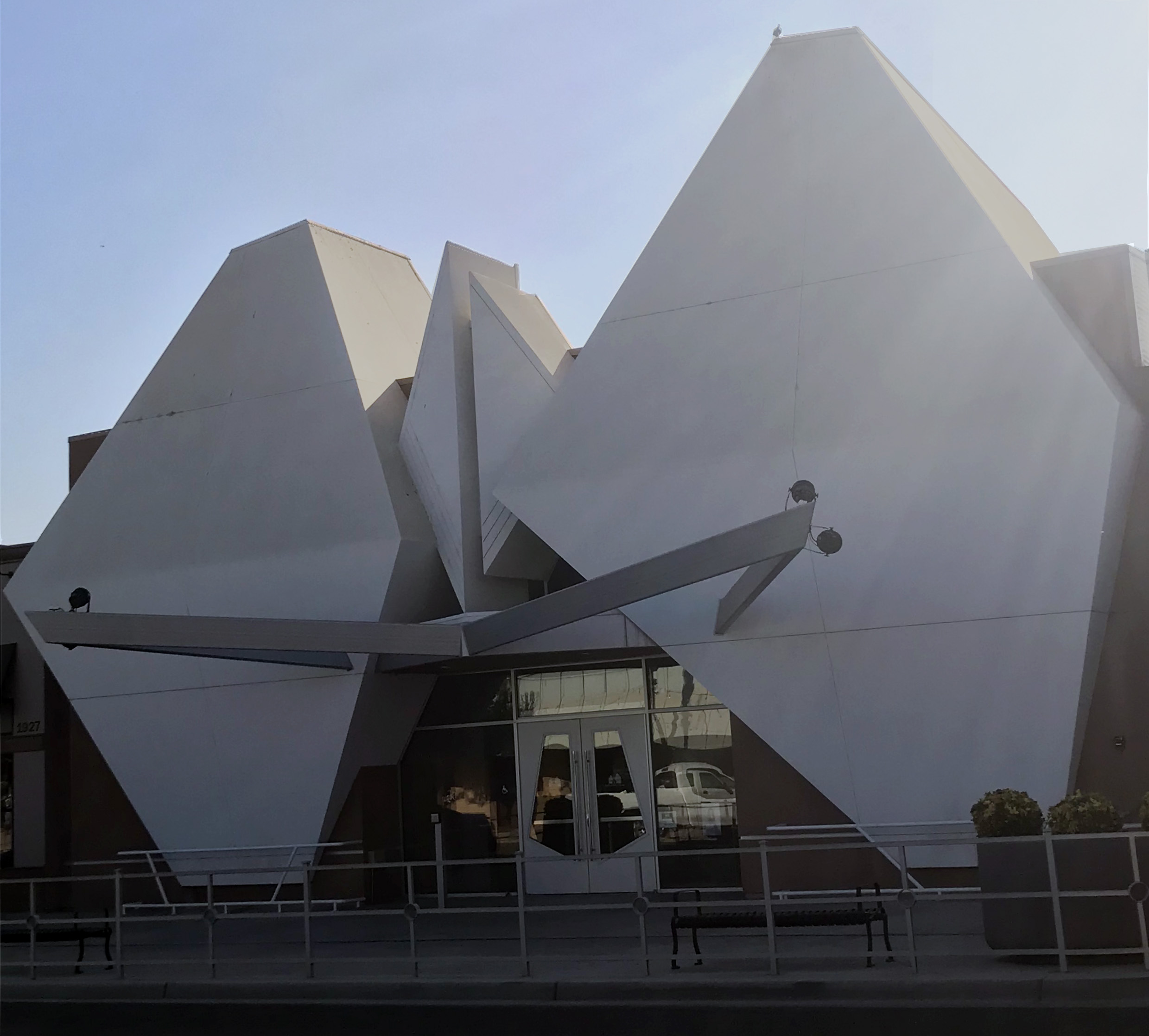
- Selma Arts Center

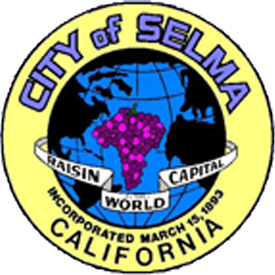
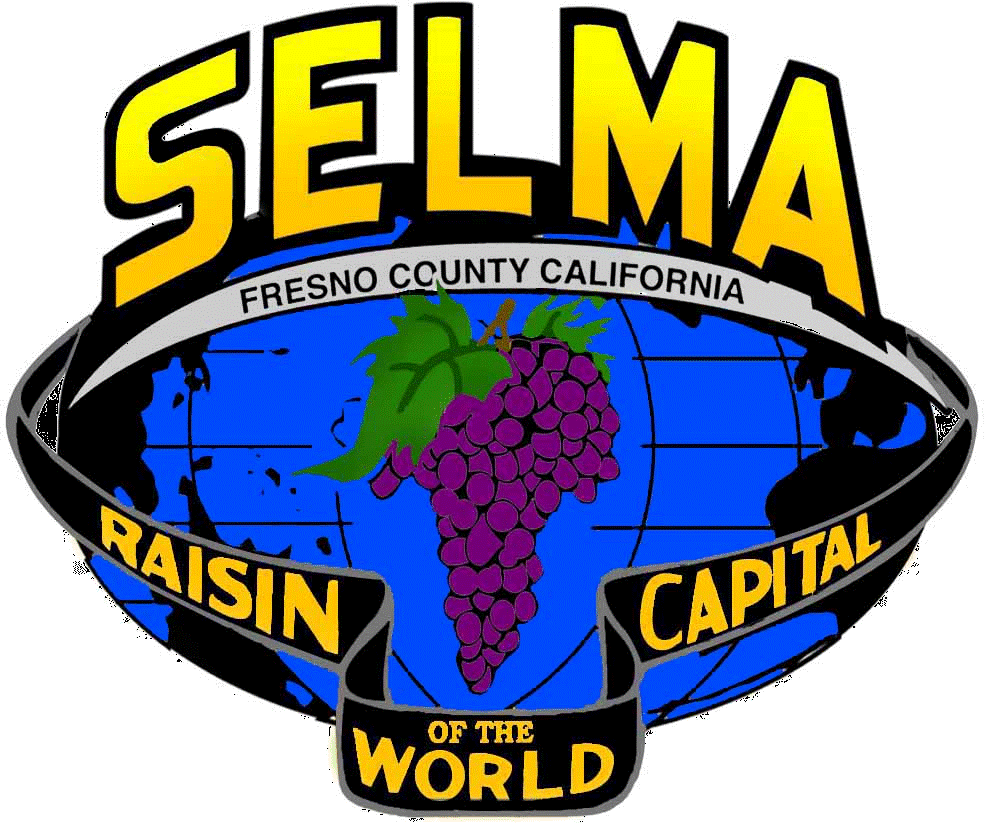
- Seal Coat of arms
- Motto: "Raisin Capital Of The World"
- Interactive map of Selma, California
- Location in the United States
- Coordinates: 36°34′15″N 119°36′43″W
- Country: United States
- State: California
- County: Fresno
- Incorporated: March 15, 1893

Government
  - Mayor: Scott Robertson
  - Mayor Pro Tem: Sarah Guerra
  - State Senator: Anna Caballero (D)
  - State Assembly: Joaquin Arambula (D)
  - U. S. Congress: Jim Costa (D)

Area
  - Total: 5.81 sq mi (15.04 km^{2})
  - Land: 5.81 sq mi (15.04 km^{2})
  - Water: 0 sq mi (0.00 km^{2}) 0%
- Elevation: 308 ft (94 m)

Population (2020)
  - Total: 24,674
  - Density: 4,249/sq mi (1,641/km^{2})
- Time zone: UTC-8 (PST)
  - Summer (DST): UTC-7 (PDT)
- ZIP code: 93662
- Area code: 559
- FIPS code: 06-70882
- GNIS feature IDs: 1659624, 2411863
- Website: www.cityofselma.com

Selma is a city in Fresno County, California, United States. The population was 24,674 at the 2020 census, up from 23,319 at the 2010 census and 19,240 at the 2000 census. Selma is located 16 miles (26 km) southeast of Fresno, at an elevation of 308 feet (94 m).

== Geography ==
According to the United States Census Bureau, the city covers an area of 5.808 square miles (15.04 km^{2}), all land.

== Demographics ==
Historical population
| Census | Pop. | Note | %± |
|---|---|---|---|
| 1890 | 1,150 | | — |
| 1900 | 1,083 | | −5.8% |
| 1910 | 1,750 | | 61.6% |
| 1920 | 3,158 | | 80.5% |
| 1930 | 3,047 | | −3.5% |
| 1940 | 3,667 | | 20.3% |
| 1950 | 5,964 | | 62.6% |
| 1960 | 6,934 | | 16.3% |
| 1970 | 7,459 | | 7.6% |
| 1980 | 10,942 | | 46.7% |
| 1990 | 14,757 | | 34.9% |
| 2000 | 19,444 | | 31.8% |
| 2010 | 23,219 | | 19.4% |
| 2020 | 24,674 | | 6.3% |
| 2024 (est.) | 24,505 | ▼ | −0.7% |
U.S. Decennial Census

=== 2020 census ===
As of the 2020 census, Selma had a population of 24,674 and a population density of 4,248.3 inhabitants per square mile (1,640.3/km^{2}). The median age was 31.9 years. The age distribution was 29.2% under the age of 18, 10.8% aged 18 to 24, 26.9% aged 25 to 44, 20.7% aged 45 to 64, and 12.3% who were 65 years of age or older. For every 100 females, there were 97.5 males, and for every 100 females age 18 and over, there were 96.3 males age 18 and over.

The census reported that 99.5% of the population lived in households, 0.1% lived in non-institutionalized group quarters, and 0.3% were institutionalized. In total, 99.7% of residents lived in urban areas, while 0.3% lived in rural areas.

There were 7,004 households in Selma, of which 49.1% had children under the age of 18 living in them. Of all households, 50.3% were married-couple households, 7.8% were cohabiting-couple households, 16.0% were households with a male householder and no spouse or partner present, and 25.9% were households with a female householder and no spouse or partner present. About 13.8% of households were one person, and 7.7% had someone living alone who was 65 years of age or older. The average household size was 3.51. There were 5,689 families (81.2% of all households).

There were 7,224 housing units at an average density of 1,243.8 units per square mile (480.2 units/km^{2}), of which 7,004 (97.0%) were occupied. Of occupied housing units, 55.7% were owner-occupied and 44.3% were occupied by renters. The homeowner vacancy rate was 1.2% and the rental vacancy rate was 1.4%.

Racial composition as of the 2020 census
| Race | Number | Percent |
|---|---|---|
| White | 6,854 | 27.8% |
| Black or African American | 211 | 0.9% |
| American Indian and Alaska Native | 601 | 2.4% |
| Asian | 1,134 | 4.6% |
| Native Hawaiian and Other Pacific Islander | 18 | 0.1% |
| Some other race | 11,082 | 44.9% |
| Two or more races | 4,774 | 19.3% |
| Hispanic or Latino (of any race) | 20,041 | 81.2% |

=== 2023 ACS 5-year estimates ===
In 2023, the US Census Bureau estimated that the median household income was $55,839, and the per capita income was $22,457. About 14.9% of families and 19.8% of the population were below the poverty line.

=== 2010 census ===
At the 2010 census Selma had a population of 23,219. The population density was 4,520.6 inhabitants per square mile (1,745.4/km^{2}). The racial makeup of Selma was 12,869 (55.4%) White, 284 (1.2%) African American, 479 (2.1%) Native American, 1,057 (4.6%) Asian, 9 (0.0%) Pacific Islander, 7,630 (32.9%) from other races, and 891 (3.8%) from two or more races. There were 18,014 Hispanic or Latino residents of any race (77.6%).

The census reported that 23,054 people (99.3% of the population) lived in households, 50 (0.2%) lived in non-institutionalized group quarters, and 115 (0.5%) were institutionalized.

There were 6,416 households, 3,411 (53.2%) had children under the age of 18 living in them, 3,553 (55.4%) were opposite-sex married couples living together, 1,158 (18.0%) had a female householder with no husband present, 560 (8.7%) had a male householder with no wife present. There were 516 (8.0%) unmarried opposite-sex partnerships, and 27 (0.4%) same-sex married couples or partnerships. 939 households (14.6%) were one person and 481 (7.5%) had someone living alone who was 65 or older. The average household size was 3.59. There were 5,271 families (82.2% of households); the average family size was 3.89.

The age distribution was 7,442 people (32.1%) under the age of 18, 2,677 people (11.5%) aged 18 to 24, 6,321 people (27.2%) aged 25 to 44, 4,483 people (19.3%) aged 45 to 64, and 2,296 people (9.9%) who were 65 or older. The median age was 29.5 years. For every 100 females, there were 100.3 males. For every 100 females age 18 and over, there were 99.8 males.

There were 6,813 housing units at an average density of 1,326.4 per square mile (512.1/km^{2}), of which 6,416 were occupied, 3,825 (59.6%) by the owners and 2,591 (40.4%) by renters. The homeowner vacancy rate was 2.4%; the rental vacancy rate was 5.5%. 13,229 people (57.0% of the population) lived in owner-occupied housing units and 9,825 people (42.3%) lived in rental housing units.

== History ==
Selma owes its beginnings as the second city in Fresno County to farming and to the Southern Pacific Railroad, which began in the 1870s as a branch line of the Central Pacific Railroad. The route of the Southern Pacific through California's Central Valley gave rise to a string of small towns between Sacramento and Bakersfield. Selma was among them.

In 1880, residents of the rural community that would become Selma established the Valley View School District. The first post office opened in 1880. A decade later, four farmers – Jacob E. Whitson, Egbert H. Tucker, George Otis and Monroe Snyder – formed a partnership and developed a townsite along the railroad. They began auctioning lots and just three years later the city of Selma was formally incorporated.

A persistent local legend is that Selma was named after Selma Gruenberg Lewis (c. 1867–1944) by Governor Leland Stanford, who was shown her picture by her father. As Lewis first told the story in 1925, Stanford, also a Director of the Central Pacific Railroad, was so taken that he ordered that the next town on the line be named for her. Lewis often repeated the story with further romantic embellishments, and it came to be accepted as fact despite a lack of documentary evidence. Lewis is buried in Floral Memorial Park in Selma, and her marker repeats the story.

The most probable namesake is actually Selma Michelsen Kingsbury (1853–1910). The name "Selma" was submitted by her husband, railroad employee Sanford Kingsbury, for inclusion in a list of candidate names prepared by his supervisor. George Otis, in consultation with other local businessmen, selected the name from this list. Selma remarried after her husband's death and is buried in Shiloh Cemetery in Windsor, California.

Along with Fowler to its immediate north and Kingsburg to its south, Selma was a railroad stop where agricultural goods could be loaded for shipping. As in the rest of the United States, the railroad played a lesser role as the 20th century progressed. What was once a handsome passenger terminal in Selma's downtown became the city's police station.

In the late 19th century, the town also boasted a water-driven mill for grinding wheat to flour. The mill was powered by the C&K Canal, a seasonal irrigation channel that was known in Selma as the Mill Ditch. Groundwater Irrigation Beginnings had its start in Selma. It was here where the San Joaquin Valley's groundwater reservoir was first tapped with a pumping plant. William De La Grange of Selma was tired of irrigationists draining Kings River water from the canal he used so he drilled an open bottom well. With the plant attracting attention, groundwater irrigation was common and pumps were powered by electricity.

=== Shifting business center ===
Like many other American cities, Selma suffered a decline in its old downtown in the late decades of the 20th century and into the 21st century. Post–World War II development spread the growing city to the north and east, away from its business center. U.S. Highway 99, once a main road running north–south through town, parallel to the railroad, was rebuilt as a freeway (now SR 99) in the 1960s. Several blocks to the west of the old road (now Whitson Street and Golden State Boulevard), the freeway bisects the oldest residential neighborhood in Selma. Freeway travel made the new shopping malls of Fresno more accessible. The freeway also made Selma more attractive as a place to live for Fresno workers, who contributed to ever-faster residential growth into the 21st century.

The downtown experienced one of its biggest changes when Walmart built a large retail store at the intersection of East Floral Avenue and the freeway—at the northwest edge of town. As the 21st century began, this area became the de facto commercial center of the city providing great economic benefits. The old downtown, despite vacant storefronts, remained a struggling but viable district of city offices and small businesses.

== Agribusiness ==
Wheat growing was Selma's first economic engine but was replaced by orchards and vineyards when farmers realized how well peaches, plums, and grapes grew in the sandy soil, irrigated with snow-melt water imported through canals from the nearby Sierra Nevada mountain range.

Although raisins soon became the major crop, Selma called itself the "Home of the Peach" and was also known as "A Peach of a City." Through the 1960s, the local peach cannery, where Libby's-brand fruit was packed, was a major seasonal employer. Peaches and other tree fruit are still grown in abundance.

With 90 percent of U.S. raisins produced within eight miles (13 km) of Selma, the city adopted the slogan "Raisin Capital of the World" in 1963. Area vineyards also produce table grapes. A decline in family farming, the national trend in U.S. agriculture after World War II, and depressed prices for raisins and table grapes, especially in the last decades of the twentieth century, were drains on the Selma-area agribusiness economy. Harris Ranch is based in Selma.

== Media ==
The weekly newspaper is the Selma Enterprise. Residents are also served by the daily Fresno Bee and by Fresno-based television and radio stations.

== Police department ==
The Selma Police Department was formed in 1893. The current police chief, Rudy Alcaraz, was appointed to the position in 2022.

== Public schools ==
The Selma Unified School District has eight neighborhood elementary schools. Students from all of these schools are channeled to Abraham Lincoln Middle School and continue on to Selma High School or two alternative high schools. Selma High School fields a range of sports teams, nicknamed the Bears. School colors are orange and black. The yearbook is the Magnet.

== Notable people ==
Well-known people who have lived in and around Selma include:

- Frank Dusy, Abijah McCall and William Deidrick, co-inventors of the Fresno scraper
- William Everson, (also known as Brother Antoninus, 1912–94), American poet
- Larry Levis (1946–96), American poet
- William R. Shockley (1918–1945), recipient of the Congressional Medal of Honor in World War II
- Victor Davis Hanson (1953– ), author–historian
- Bobby Cox (1941– ), manager of the Atlanta Braves baseball team
- Clarence Berry (1867–1930), mining engineer and businessman in the Klondike Gold Rush of 1897
- Beatrice Kozera (1920–2013), "The Mexican Girl" in On the Road by Jack Kerouac
- Frankie A. Rodriguez (1996– ), an actor from the Disney franchise High School Musical: The Musical: The Series
- Matt Garza (1983– ), MLB pitcher from 2006 to 2017, threw the only no-hitter for the Tampa Bay Rays
