= List of Gloria Stuart performances =

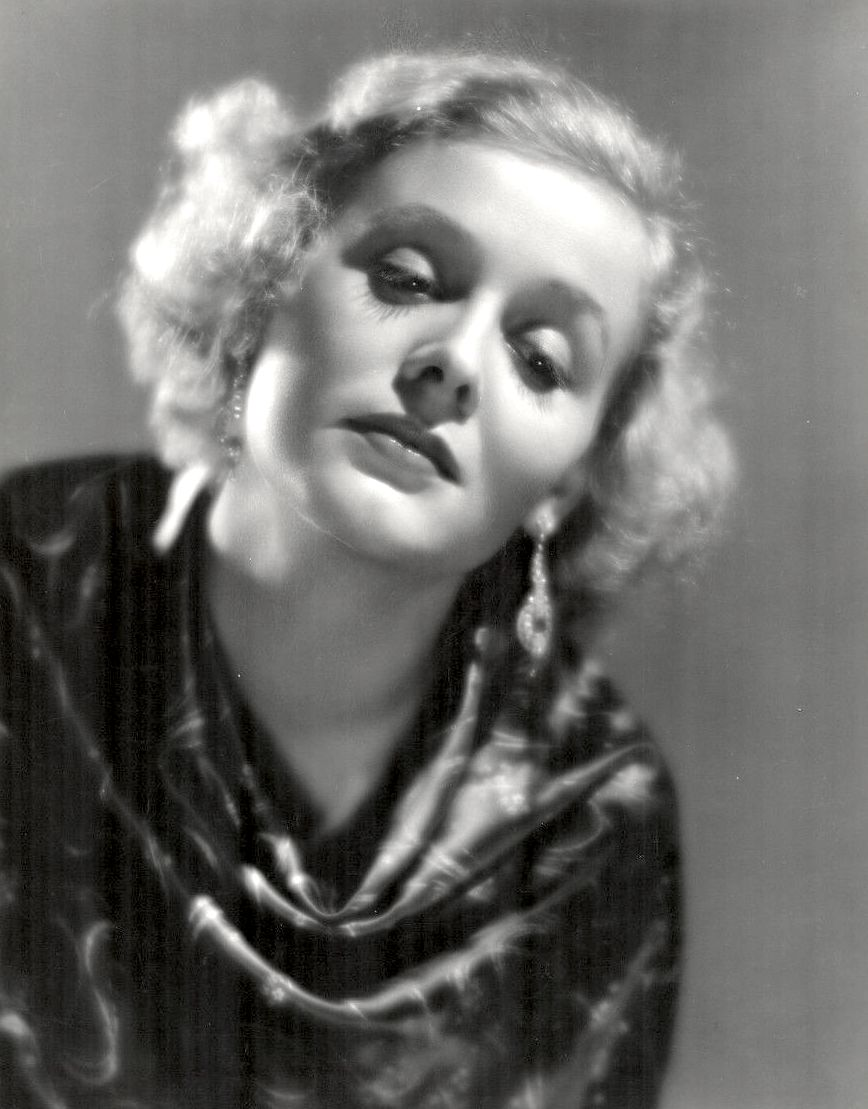
Stuart in 1932

Gloria Stuart (July 4, 1910 – September 26, 2010) was an American film actress whose career spanned over 70 years. She made her feature film debut in Street of Women (1932), before signing a contract with Universal Pictures. She appeared in numerous Pre-code era films for the studio, including the horror comedy The Old Dark House (1932), and the drama Laughter in Hell (1933). She starred as Flora Cranley in The Invisible Man (1933), which garnered her widespread fame, and later starred in two films opposite Shirley Temple: Poor Little Rich Girl (1936), and Rebecca of Sunnybrook Farm (1938), both for 20th Century Fox. She subsequently co-starred in The Three Musketeers (1939) opposite Don Ameche.

Dissatisfied with her career in film, Stuart shifted her focus to stage acting. Between 1940 and 1942, Stuart appeared in numerous summer stock plays in New England, including a 1940 production of Our Town in which she starred alongside its playwright and director, Thornton Wilder. By the mid-1940s, Stuart was dedicating her time to the pursuit of various visual arts, including painting, printmaking, serigraphy, Bonsai, and découpage. She gradually returned to acting in the 1970s after a decades-long career as an artist, appearing in minor roles in such films as Richard Benjamin's My Favorite Year (1982) and Wildcats (1986).

Stuart was cast as 101-year-old Rose Calvert in James Cameron's drama Titanic (1997), which earned her international notoriety, as well as numerous accolades, including an Academy Award nomination for Best Supporting Actress; which as of 2021, she remains the oldest nominee for the category. Her final film performance was a minor part in Wim Wenders' Land of Plenty (2004), before her death in 2010 at age 100.

== Film ==
- Note: Some sources include Back Street (1932) in Stuart's filmography in an uncredited performance; since Stuart does not mention the film in her book, and because she is not listed in Back Street, this film is not included below.

Year	Title	Role	Notes	Ref.
1932	Street of Women	Doris "Dodo" Baldwin		
1932	The All American	Ellen Steffens		
1932	The Old Dark House	Margaret Waverton		
1932	Air Mail	Ruth Barnes		
1933	Laughter in Hell	Lorraine		
1933	Private Jones	Mary Gregg		
1933	Sweepings	Phoebe		
1933	The Kiss Before the Mirror	Lucy Bernsdorf		
1933	The Girl in 419	Mary Dolan		
1933	It's Great to Be Alive	Dorothy Wilton		
1933	The Secret of the Blue Room	Irene von Helldorf		
1933	The Invisible Man	Flora Cranley		
1933	Roman Scandals	Princess Sylvia		
1934	Beloved	Lucy Tarrant Hausmann		
1934	I Like It That Way	Anne Rogers / Dolly Lavern		
1934	I'll Tell the World	Jane Hamilton		
1934	The Love Captive	Alice Trask		
1934	Here Comes the Navy	Dorothy "Dot" Martin		
1934	Gift of Gab	Barbara Kelton		
1935	Maybe It's Love	Bobby Halevy		
1935	Gold Diggers of 1935	Ann Prentiss		
1935	Laddie	Pamela Pryor		
1935	Professional Soldier	Countess Sonia		
1936	The Prisoner of Shark Island	Mrs. Peggy Mudd		
1936	The Crime of Dr. Forbes	Ellen Godfrey		
1936	36 Hours to Kill	Anne Marvis		
1936	Poor Little Rich Girl	Margaret Allen		
1936	The Girl on the Front Page	Joan Langford		
1936	Wanted! Jane Turner	Doris Martin		
1937	Girl Overboard	Mary Chesbrooke		
1937	The Lady Escapes	Linda Ryan		
1937	Life Begins in College	Janet O'Hara		
1938	Change of Heart	Carol Murdock		
1938	Rebecca of Sunnybrook Farm	Gwen Warren		
1938	Island in the Sky	Julie Hayes		
1938	Keep Smiling	Carol Walters		
1938	Time Out for Murder	Margie Ross		
1938	The Lady Objects	Ann Adams Hayward		
1939	The Three Musketeers	Queen Anne		
1939	Winner Take All	Julie Harrison		
1939	It Could Happen to You	Doris Winslow		
1943	Here Comes Elmer	Glenda Forbes		
1944	The Whistler	Alice Walker		
1944	Enemy of Women	Bertha		
1946	She Wrote the Book	Phyllis Fowler		
1982	My Favorite Year	Mrs. Horn		
1984	Mass Appeal	Mrs. Curry		
1986	Wildcats	Mrs. Connoly		
1997	Titanic	Rose Dawson Calvert	Nominated–Academy Award for Best Supporting Actress	
1999	The Love Letter	Eleanor		
1999	The Titanic Chronicles	Helen Bishop	Voice role	
2000	The Million Dollar Hotel	Jessica		
2004	Land of Plenty	Old lady	Final film role	

=== Television films ===
Year	Title	Role	Ref.
1975	The Legend of Lizzie Borden	Store customer	
1975	Adventures of the Queen	Female passenger	
1976	Flood!	Mrs. Parker	
1977	In the Glitter Palace	Mrs. Bowman	
1979	The Incredible Journey of Doctor Meg Laurel	Rose Hooper	
1979	The Best Place to Be		
1979	The Two Worlds of Jennie Logan	Roberta	
1980	Fun and Games	Terri	
1981	The Violation of Sarah McDavid	Mrs. Fowler	
1981	Merlene of the Movies	Evangeline Eaton	
1985	There Were Times, Dear		
1988	Shootdown	Gertrude	
1989	She Knows Too Much	Kiki Watwood	
2000	My Mother, the Spy	Grandma	
2001	Murder, She Wrote: The Last Free Man	Eliza Hoops	

== Television ==
Year	Title	Role	Notes	Ref.
1975	The Waltons	Saleswoman	1 episode	
1980	Enos	Lilly	1 episode	
1983	Manimal	Bag Lady	1 episode	
1987	Murder, She Wrote	Edna Jarvis	Episode: "The Days Dwindle Down"	
2001	The Invisible Man	Madeline Fawkes	1 episode	
2001	Touched by an Angel	Grams	1 episode	
2002–2003	General Hospital	Catherine	2 episodes	
2003	Miracles	Rosanna Wye	1 episode	

== Music videos ==
Year	Title	Performer	Notes	Ref.
1998	"River"	Hanson	Reprised role as a parody of her character in Titanic	

== Stage ==
Year	Title	Role	Venue	Ref.
1931	The Seagull	Masha	The Playbox, Pasadena, California	
1940	Accent on Youth	Linda Brown	Guilford Theatre, Pittsburgh, Pennsylvania	
1940	The Animal Kingdom	Daisy Sage	Town Hall Playhouse, Westborough, Massachusetts	
1940	Our Town	Emily Webb	University of Massachusetts Amherst	
1940–1942	Night of January 16th	Karen Andre	Regional New England tour	
1941	Arms and the Man	Raina Petkoff	Drama Festival, Ann Arbor, Michigan	
1941	Mr. and Mrs. North	Pamela North	County Theater, Suffern, New York	
1942	The Dark Tower	Patsy Dowling	Cambridge Summer Theatre, Cambridge, Massachusetts	
1942	Sailor Beware!	Billie Jackson	Flatbush Theater, Brooklyn, New York City	

== Sources ==
- Deal, Dave (2011). Television Fright Films of the 1970s. Jefferson, North Carolina: McFarland. ISBN 978-0-786-45514-0.
- Gardner, Gerald; Bellows, Jim (2007). 80: From Ben Bradlee to Lena Horne to Carl Reiner, Our Most Famous Eighty Year Olds, Reveal Why They Never Felt So Young. Sourcebooks. ISBN 978-1-40220-840-9.
- Lentz, Harris M. III (2011). Obituaries in the Performing Arts, 2010. Jefferson, North Carolina: McFarland. ISBN 978-0-786-44175-4.
- Mank, Gregory William (2005). Women in Horror Films, 1930s. Jefferson, North Carolina: McFarland. ISBN 978-0-78642-334-7.
- Stuart, Gloria; Thompson, Sylvia (1999). Gloria Stuart: I Just Kept Hoping. Boston: Little, Brown, and Company. ISBN 0-316-81571-3.
