= Frank Finch =

American sportswriter

- Born: Frank Stewart Jr. July 28, 1911; Santa Monica, California, U.S.
- Died: August 7, 1992 (aged 81); Arcadia, California, U.S.
- Education: University of California, Berkeley (B.A.)
- Occupations: Sportswriter, Author
- Employer: Los Angeles Times (retired 1976)
- Spouse: Marjorie Corley (m. 1930)
- Children: 1
- Relatives: Gloria Stuart (sister); Sylvia Thompson (niece); William Deidrick (maternal grandfather)

Frank Stewart Finch (born Frank Stewart Jr.; July 28, 1911 – August 7, 1992) was an American sportswriter for the Los Angeles Times where he worked for over four decades. He became the paper's first Major League Baseball beat reporter when the Los Angeles Dodgers moved to the West Coast in 1958.

== Early life ==
Finch was born Frank Stewart Jr. to Alice (née Deidrick) and Frank Stewart, an attorney. His mother was a third-generation Californian while his father was originally from The Dalles, Oregon. His older sister was actress Gloria Stuart (b. Gloria Stewart, 1910); Frank Jr. also had a younger brother Thomas (b. 1913) who died due to spinal meningitis at age three.

At eleven months old, Frank contracted infantile paralysis, which affected his right leg. According to his sister, the condition was misdiagnosed as a broken leg and put in a cast. The leg subsequently withered, causing him to wear a brace and walk with a limp for the rest of his life.

When Frank was eight years old, Frank Sr. died as the result of an infection from an injury sustained when an automobile grazed his leg. In order to support her children, his mother remarried soon afterwards, to local businessman Fred J. Finch with whom she had a daughter named Patricia (b. 1924). Soon after the marriage, Frank and his sister took their stepfather's surname.

Finch attended Santa Monica High School and graduated from the University of California, Berkeley.

== Career ==
Finch began his career as a sportswriter with Los Angeles Times in the 1930s, covering college football and boxing. He began to cover the Los Angeles Rams and the Los Angeles Dodgers when the teams moved to Los Angeles, in 1946 and 1958 respectively.

When it was rumored that the Brooklyn Dodgers would be moving the West Coast, Finch requested the Times' sports editor Paul Zimmerman to remove him from the Rams beat and assign him to the Los Angeles-based Pacific Coast League teams, the Los Angeles Angels and the Hollywood Stars, so he could learn to cover baseball. He subsequently became the Times' first Major League Baseball beat reporter.

He was known for his colorful phrases such as "two-bagger" for a double and a "can of succotash" for an easy fly ball.

Finch finished his career as an editor on the Times' sports copy desk. When he retired in 1976, Dodgers owner Walter O'Malley gave him a lifetime pass to the press box at Dodger Stadium.

In 1978, Finch wrote a book called The Los Angeles Dodgers: The First 20 Years.

== Personal life ==
In 1930, Frank married Marjorie Corley with whom he had one child, a daughter named Deborah. They were married for 62 years, till his death in 1992, and resided in Temple City, California.

After retiring from the Times, Finch worked at a deposition firm until he was diagnosed with leukemia. After learning that he had leukemia, Finch embarked on a 2,500-mile automobile trip through the western United States.

Finch died in Arcadia, California on August 7, 1992, 10 days after his 81st birthday. He was survived by his wife, daughter, granddaughter, and great-granddaughter, as well as by his sister Gloria and niece Sylvia.

== Book sources ==
- Stuart, Gloria; Thompson, Sylvia (1999). Gloria Stuart: I Just Kept Hoping. Little, Brown, and Company. ISBN 0-316-81571-3.
