= Abijah McCall =

Abijah McCall was a co-inventor of the Fresno Scraper, a horse-drawn (and later, tractor-drawn) earth-moving machine upon which modern road- and canal-building equipment is based. Along with his partner Frank Dusy, McCall devised an improvement on the Buck Scraper, invented by James Porteous. On June 15, 1885, McCall and Dusy received U.S. Patent 320,055 for their version of the scraper. Porteous purchased the patents held by Dusy and McCall and also a patent held by William Deidrick as he perfected the scraper, which Porteous also manufactured at his factory in Fresno, California. The scraper was widely used in the Western United States and also put into use by U.S. engineers building the Panama Canal. Deidrick, Dusy, and McCall were all early residents of Selma, California, where McCall Avenue is named for McCall. McCall reputedly used a Fresno Scraper in building the road which runs through Selma and north to Clovis, California.
