= Gloria Stuart =

American actress and painter (1910–2010)

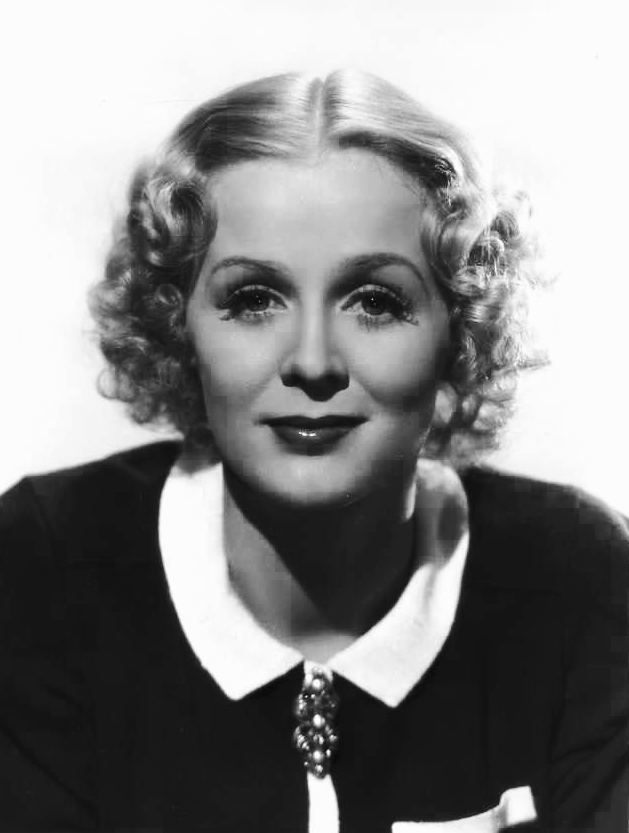
- Stuart in 1937
- Born: Gloria Stewart; July 4, 1910; Santa Monica, California, U.S.
- Died: September 26, 2010 (aged 100); Los Angeles, California, U.S.
- Other names: Gloria Finch; Gloria Frances Stuart
- Occupations: Actress; artist; fine printer
- Years active: 1927–2004
- Works: Filmography
- Political party: Democratic
- Spouses: Blair Gordon Newell (m. 1930; div. 1934); Arthur Sheekman (m. 1934; died 1978)
- Children: Sylvia Vaughn Thompson
- Relatives: Frank Finch (brother); William Deidrick (maternal grandfather)

Gloria Frances Stuart (born Gloria Stewart; July 4, 1910 – September 26, 2010) was an American actress, visual artist and activist. She was known for her roles in pre-code films, and garnered renewed fame late in life for her portrayal of Rose Dawson Calvert in James Cameron's epic romance Titanic (1997), one of the highest-grossing films of all time. Her performance in the film won her a Screen Actors Guild Award for Outstanding Performance by a Female Actor in a Supporting Role and earned her nominations for the Academy Award for Best Supporting Actress and the Golden Globe Award for Best Supporting Actress – Motion Picture.

A native of Santa Monica, California, Stuart began acting while in high school. After attending the University of California, Berkeley, she embarked on a career in theater, performing in local productions and summer stock in Los Angeles and New York City. She signed a film contract with Universal Pictures in 1932, and acted in numerous films for the studio, including the horror films The Old Dark House (1932) and The Invisible Man (1933), followed by roles in the Shirley Temple musicals Poor Little Rich Girl (1936) and Rebecca of Sunnybrook Farm (1938). She also starred as Queen Anne of Austria in the musical comedy The Three Musketeers (1939).

Beginning in 1940, Stuart slowed her film career, instead performing in regional theater in New England. In 1945, following a tenure as a contract player for Twentieth Century Fox, Stuart abandoned her acting career and shifted to a career as an artist, working as a fine printer and making paintings, serigraphy, miniature books, Bonsai, and découpage for the next three decades. She produced numerous pieces during this period, many of which are part of collections in the Los Angeles County Museum of Art and the Metropolitan Museum of Art.

Stuart gradually returned to acting in the late 1970s, appearing in several bit parts, including in Richard Benjamin's My Favorite Year (1982) and Wildcats (1986). She made a prominent return to mainstream cinema at age 86 when she was cast as the 100-year-old elder Rose Dawson Calvert in Titanic (1997), which earned her numerous accolades and renewed attention. Her final film performance was in Wim Wenders' Land of Plenty (2004).

In addition to her acting and art careers, Stuart was a lifelong environmental and political activist, who served as a co-founding member of the Screen Actors Guild and the Hollywood Anti-Nazi League.

== Biography ==
=== 1910–1929: Early life ===
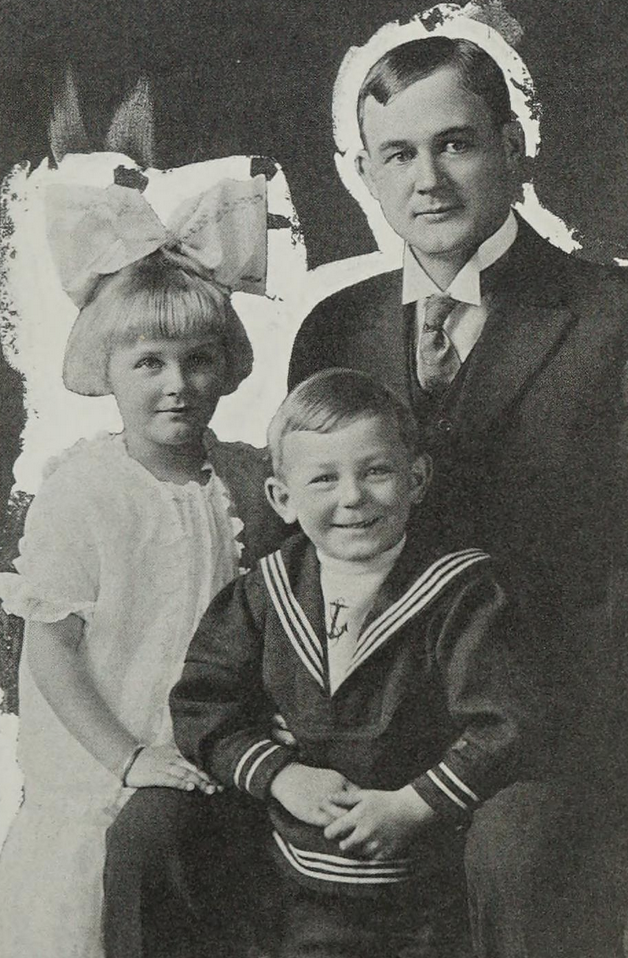
Stuart beside her brother, Frank Jr., and father, c. 1914

Stuart was born Gloria Stewart at 11:00 p.m. on the Fourth of July, 1910 on the family's kitchen table in Santa Monica, California, the first child of Alice (née Deidrick) and Frank Stewart. Through her mother, Stuart was a third-generation Californian; Stuart's maternal grandmother, Alice Vaughan, was born in 1854 in Angels Camp, gold country, two years after her own mother, Berilla (Stuart's great-grandmother), relocated to California from Missouri in a covered wagon. Her maternal grandfather, William Deidrick, was a farmer to whom the invention of the Deidrick Scraper is partially attributed. Stuart's father, a native of The Dalles, Oregon, was of Scottish descent, and studied law in San Francisco. At the time of her birth, he was an attorney representing The Six Companies. Stuart had one younger brother, Frank Jr., born eleven months later. (Note: Frank Jr. is better known as Frank Finch and grew up to be a well-respected sportswriter for the Los Angeles Times.) Another younger brother Thomas was born two years after Frank Jr.; however, he died due to spinal meningitis at age three.

As a child, Stuart attended a Church of Christ with her mother, and subsequently attended a Catholic school. Her father, originally a Presbyterian, converted to Christian Science during her childhood. When Stuart was nine years old, her father died as the result of an infection from an injury sustained when an automobile grazed his leg. She was also expelled from grade school after kicking her teacher ("to be honest, she deserved it", she recalled). Hard-pressed to support two small children, her mother soon accepted the proposal of local businessman Fred J. Finch. (Note: Half-sister Patricia Marie Finch was born in 1924.)

Stuart attended her schooling using the name Gloria Fae Finch. She had not been given a middle name by her parents and so adopted one, Frances, the feminine of Frank, her father's name.

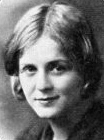
Stuart as high school senior, 1927

Stuart attended Santa Monica High School, where she was active in theater and performed the lead role in her senior class play, The Swan. She loved writing as much as acting and spent her last two summers in high school taking short story and poetry writing classes and working as a cub reporter for the Santa Monica Outlook.

While a teenager, she had a tumultuous relationship with her stepfather and sought to attend college in order to leave home. After high school, Stuart enrolled at the University of California at Berkeley, majoring in philosophy and drama. In college, she appeared in plays, worked on the Daily Californian, contributed to the campus literary journal, Occident, and posed as an artist's model. It was at Berkeley that she began signing her name Gloria Stuart. (Note: She recognized that the symmetry of the six letters of (Gloria) Stuart would look better on a marquee than the seven letters of Stewart.)

While a student at UC Berkeley, Stuart wanted to join the Young Communist League. She wrote, "I was told it was for the poor and the oppressed. That appealed to me. But membership wasn't open to anyone under eighteen, so I couldn't join." In Carmel, she notes that her friendship with muckraker Lincoln Steffens gave her "... much deeper insight into the abuses of laborers and blue-collar workers and made me ready to work for liberal causes when I got to Hollywood a few years later."

At the end of her junior year, in June 1930, Stuart married Blair Gordon Newell, a young sculptor who apprenticed with Ralph Stackpole on the facade of the San Francisco Stock Exchange building. The Newells moved to Carmel-by-the-Sea where there was a stimulating community of artists such as Ansel Adams, Edward Weston, Robinson Jeffers and Lincoln Steffens and his wife Ella Winter. In Carmel-by-the-Sea, Stuart performed in productions at the Theatre of the Golden Bough and worked as a staff member on The Carmelite newspaper. She meanwhile made hand-sewn aprons, patchwork pillows and tea linens, and created bouquets of dried flowers for a tea shop, in which she also worked as a waitress. Newell laid brick, chopped and stacked wood, taught sculpture and woodworking, and managed a miniature golf course. They lived in a shack in the middle of a wood yard as night watchmen. Stuart would later reflect on this period of her life as "wonderfully bohemian."

=== 1930–1934: Theatre and early films ===
Stuart's performance in the theatre in Carmel brought her to the attention of Gilmor Brown's private theater, The Playbox, in Pasadena. She was invited there to appear as Masha in Anton Chekhov's The Seagull. Opening night, casting directors from Paramount and Universal were in the audience. Both came backstage to arrange a screen test, both studios claimed her. Finally the studios flipped a coin and Universal won the toss. Stuart considered herself a serious actress in theater, but she and Newell "were stony broke, living hand to mouth" so she decided to sign the contract with Universal, which paid a bit more than Paramount.

According to Stuart, she began her film career by playing an ingénue confronting her father's mistress in the Warner Bros. film Street of Women, a Pre-Code fallen-women film for which she was loaned by Universal. Stuart's second film, again playing an ingénue, was in the football-hero film, The All-American.

In early December 1932, the Western Association of Motion Picture Advertisers announced that Gloria Stuart was one of fifteen new movie actresses "Most Likely to Succeed"—she was a WAMPAS Baby Star. Ginger Rogers, Mary Carlisle, Eleanor Holm were among the others. Stuart's career advanced when English director James Whale chose her for his film The Old Dark House (1932), playing the glamour role of a sentimental wife who winds up stranded among strangers at a spooky mansion, among the ensemble cast (Boris Karloff, Melvyn Douglas, Charles Laughton, Lilian Bond, Ernest Thesiger, Eva Moore and Raymond Massey). The film was critically praised, and The New York Times called Stuart's performance "clever and charming," with the movie later becoming a cult classic. Stuart's experience filming The Old Dark House also became integral to the formation of the Screen Actors Guild in 1933:

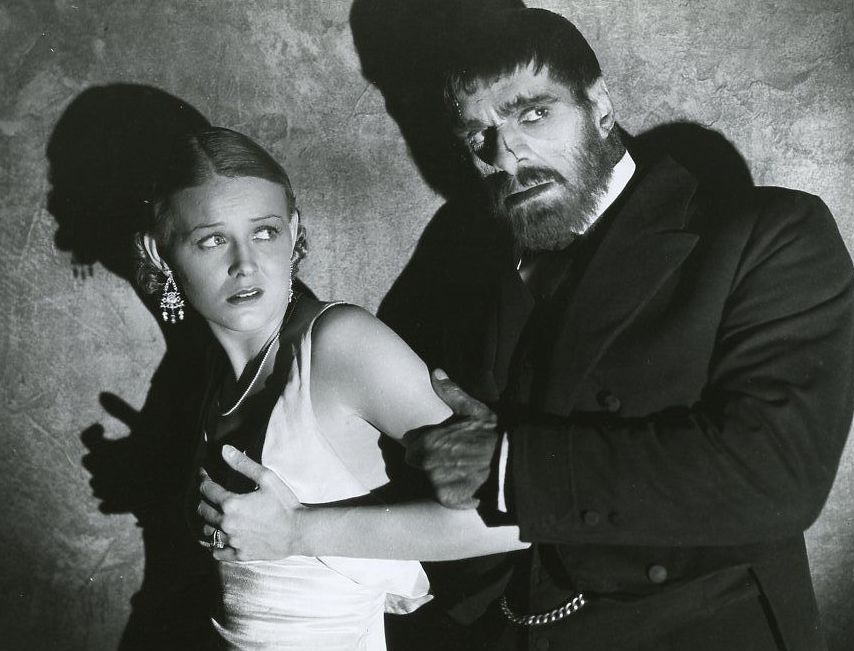
Stuart and Boris Karloff in The Old Dark House (1932)

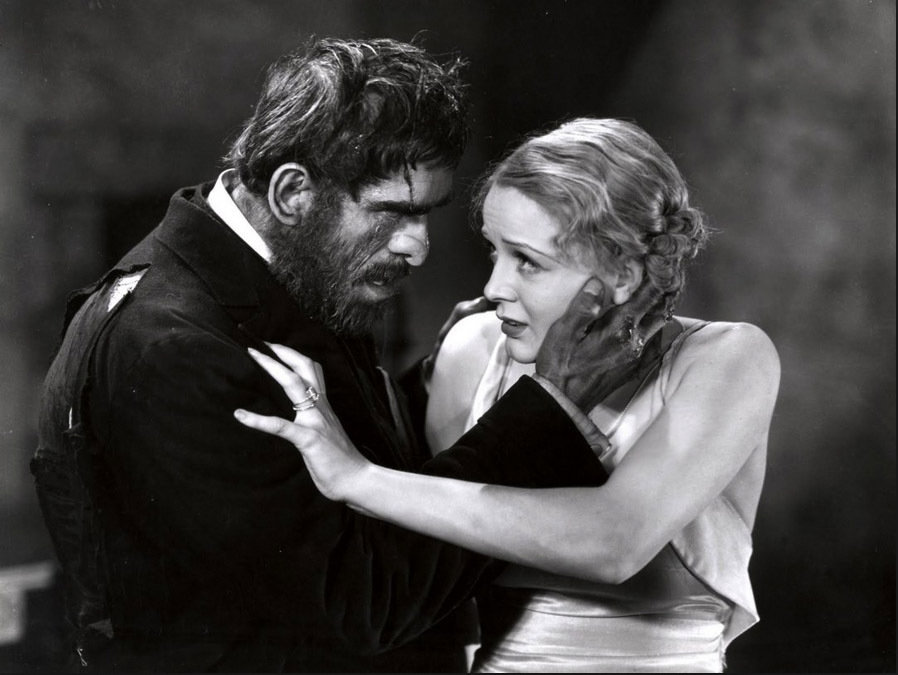
Boris Karloff and Stuart in The Old Dark House (1932)

James [Whale] joined all the English actors", Stuart recalled. "So on one side of the set they had their 'elevensies' and `foursies,' and Melvyn [Douglas] and I would be sitting together, not invited. One day, Melvyn said to me, `Are you interested in forming a union together?' I said, 'What's a union?' He said, 'Like in New York – Actor's Equity. The actors get together and work for better working conditions.' I said, 'Oh wonderful,' because I was getting up at five every morning; in makeup at seven, in hair at eight, wardrobe at quarter of nine, and then sometimes if production wanted you to, you worked until four or five the next morning. There was no overtime. They fed us when they felt like it, when it was convenient for production. It was really very, very hard work.

After filming completed, Stuart began canvassing for supporters; she became one of the union's first founding members. In June 1936, she helped Paul Muni, Franchot Tone, Ernst Lubitsch, and Oscar Hammerstein II form the Hollywood Anti-Nazi League. That same year she and writer Dorothy Parker helped create the League to Support the Spanish Civil War Orphans.

Stuart was given her first co-starring role by director John Ford in her next film, Air Mail, playing opposite Pat O'Brien and Ralph Bellamy. Of her performance in the movie, The New York Times' Mordaunt Hall wrote: "Gloria Stuart, who does so well in The Old Dark House, a picture now at the Rialto, makes the most of the part of the girl ..." That two Gloria Stuart movies were in theaters simultaneously became the rule rather than the exception in her early career. In 1932, her first year, Stuart had four films released, then nine in 1933, six in 1934. In 1935, Stuart was having a baby, so only four movies were released. Six movies followed in 1936. After Air Mail, Mordaunt Hall's notices for Gloria Stuart came down to a few words. Laughter in Hell: "Gloria Stuart appears as Lorraine ..."; Sweepings: "... played by the comely Gloria Stuart ..."; Private Jones: "Gloria Stuart is charming ..."

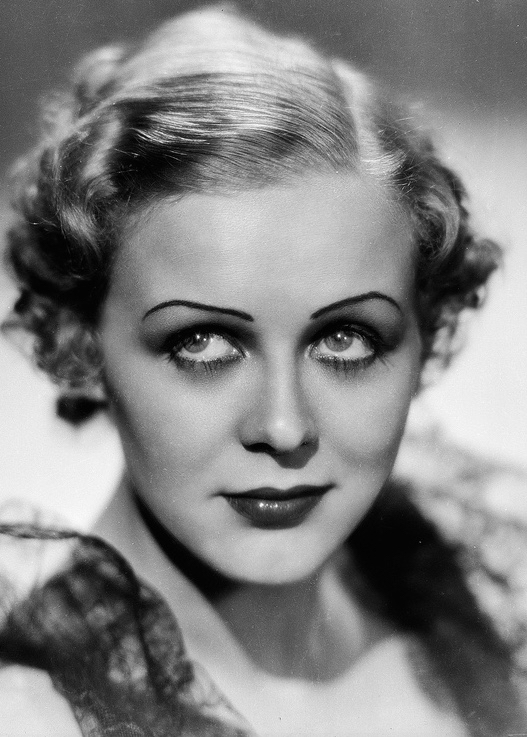
Stuart in 1933

James Whale called Stuart back for just one scene in The Kiss Before the Mirror, but the critic Hall wrote, "There are those who may think that it is too bad to introduce as one of the players the dainty Gloria Stuart and have her killed off in the first episode of the narrative. Perhaps it is, but a pretty girl was needed for the part and Mr. Whale obviously did not wish to weaken his production by casting an incompetent actress or an unattractive one for this minor role."

After good notices in The Girl in 419, (Mordaunt Hall mentions "... the pleasing acting of the attractive Gloria Stuart), and Secret of the Blue Room ("Miss Stuart gives a pleasing performance."), James Whale cast Stuart opposite Claude Rains in The Invisible Man (1933). Rains was a celebrated import from the London stage, and this was his first Hollywood film. (Mordaunt Hall's review of Stuart's work was a temperate, "Miss Stuart also does well by her role.") After having appeared in several of Whale's films, Stuart became friends with him and his partner, David Lewis.

Stuart's husband, Gordon Newell, was unhappy with Hollywood life. He and Stuart separated amicably and divorced. In 1933 (on the set of her film Roman Scandals, a comedy starring Eddie Cantor), Stuart met Arthur Sheekman, one of the movie's writers. They were "instantly attracted to each other". Stuart and Sheekman married in August 1934.

In 1934, Universal loaned Stuart to Warner Brothers for Here Comes the Navy. Stuart co-starred with James Cagney and Pat O'Brien, the first of nine films featuring this male team. Frank S. Nugent wrote in The New York Times, "Supporting Mr. Cagney--and doing very creditable jobs, too--are Pat O'Brien, Gloria Stuart ..."

=== 1935–1939: 20th Century Fox ===
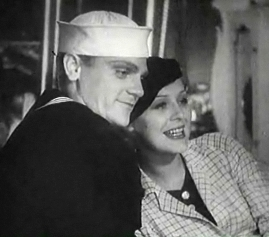
Stuart with James Cagney in Here Comes the Navy (1934)

In 1935, Stuart was cast as Dick Powell's love interest in Busby Berkeley's Gold Diggers of 1935. It was a musical. Stuart did not dance or sing due to being pregnant, and The New York Times critic commented: "Nor has Gloria Stuart anything of vast import to contribute in the position usually occupied by Ruby Keeler."

Stuart's daughter, Sylvia – named after Princess Sylvia, Stuart's character in Roman Scandals – was born in June 1935.

In that same year, Stuart left Universal and joined Twentieth Century-Fox. Her first assignment from studio head Darryl F. Zanuck was in Professional Soldier, supporting child star Freddie Bartholomew and Victor McLaglen (who, the year before, had won a Best Actor Oscar for his role in The Informer). Frank S. Nugent noted: "There is a minor romance along the way between Gloria Stuart, the king's noble governess, and Michael Whalen, the professional soldier's part-time assistant, but no one should take it seriously." In 1936, John Ford chose Stuart to co-star with Warner Baxter in The Prisoner of Shark Island. Playing the wife of the doctor who treated Lincoln's assassin, Stuart felt privileged to work again with Ford, although The New York Times' Frank S. Nugent wrote of Stuart's "... helpful performance ..." In Poor Little Rich Girl, Stuart again was asked to support a child star — this time Shirley Temple. Frank S. Nugent: "Listing [Temple's] supporting players hastily, then, before we forget them entirely, we might mention Miss Faye [and] Gloria Stuart ... as having been permitted a scene or two while Miss Temple was out freshening her costume."

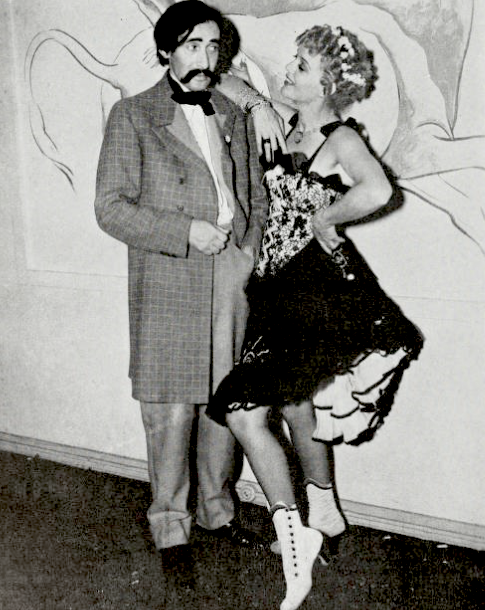
Stuart with her second husband, Arthur Sheekman, 1937

For the rest of 1936 and through 1937, Zanuck placed Stuart in movies such as The Girl on the Front Page—Frank S. Nugent's note: "Call it mediocre and extend your sympathies to the cast ..." Reviewing Girl Overboard, Nugent begins, "In the definitive words of the currently popular threnode featured by a frog-voiced radio singer, Universal's 'Girl Overboard' ... is 'nuthin' but a nuthin',' and a Class B nuthin' at that." In spite of the films' lukewarm reviews, Stuart had amassed a loyal following of fans by this time in her career, one of whom had her portrait tattooed across his chest. Stuart met with the fan and was photographed with him for a Life magazine profile in the fall of 1937.

Stuart later appeared in The Lady Escapes, Life Begins in College and Change of Heart, which did not merit space in The New York Times' movie pages. In 1938, Zanuck again insisted Stuart support Shirley Temple in Rebecca of Sunnybrook Farm (1938). In their review of the film, Variety wrote: "Shirley Temple proves she's a great little artist in this one. The rest of it is synthetic and disappointing ... More fitting title would be Rebecca of Radio City." In 1938, for the fourth time, Stuart was a supporting player to a child star: Jane Withers in Keep Smiling. Stuart but not her performance is noted in The New York Times review.

In Time Out for Murder, Stuart's reviewer said she was "... a pretty bill collector". Then in 1939, the last year in this phase of Stuart's career, in The Three Musketeers, Stuart's billing came after Don Ameche, The Ritz Brothers and Binnie Barnes and again Stuart's work was not reviewed. In Winner Take All, the Times critic wrote, "... the only thing worth seeing in the picture is Tony Martin trying to play a prizefighter. This is positively killing." It Could Happen to You, "a quasi-comedy" co-starring Stuart Erwin, finished the eight years. Again Stuart is not mentioned.

What did give the actress space in the movie pages the previous November was the story: "Gloria Stuart Quits Fox ... Gloria Stuart has terminated her contract with Fox ..." In fact, Darryl Zanuck did not renew Stuart's contract.

=== 1940–1944: Departure from Hollywood ===
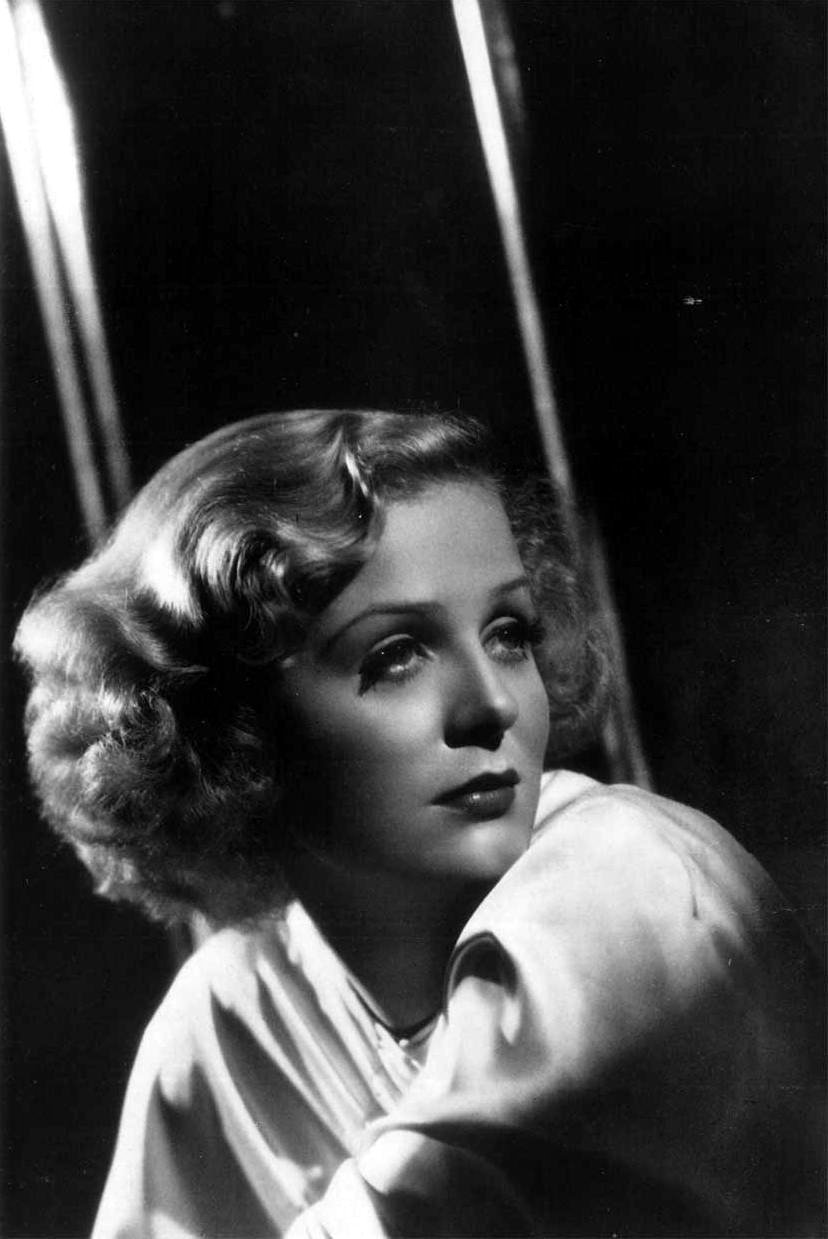
Publicity still of Stuart, c. 1937

Early in 1939, Stuart and then-husband Sheekman spent four months traveling in Asia, Egypt and Italy, then landed in France just as France and the United Kingdom declared war on Germany. They appealed to the American consul, asking to stay, Sheekman as a war correspondent, Stuart as a hospital volunteer. The consul refused help and told them they had to return to the United States. They caught the SS President Adams, the last American passenger ship to cross the Atlantic, and arrived in New York City in September.

In New York, Stuart sought to return to stage acting, hoping to star on Broadway. "I wanted to be a theater actress", she said, "but I thought it would be easier to get to New York and the theater if I had a name than if I just walked the streets as a little girl from California. When I went back to New York with somewhat of a name, they didn't want movie actresses." Stuart was, however, welcomed into summer stock theater on the east coast and performed in various productions between 1940 and 1942, including Man and Superman, The Animal Kingdom, The Night of January 16th, Accent on Youth, Mr. and Mrs. North, Arms and the Man, and Sailor Beware!. In August 1940, she starred as Emily Webb, opposite Thornton Wilder—under Wilder's own direction—in his play Our Town, which was staged at the University of Massachusetts Amherst.

To help with the war effort in the 1940s, Stuart took singing and dancing lessons; then the USO teamed her with actress Hillary Brooke. The two blonde actresses toured the country, visited hospitals, danced with servicemen in canteens, sold war bonds. Stuart "wanted terribly to volunteer for service overseas with the USO, but Arthur wouldn't hear of it."

On September 16, 1942, Stuart voiced one of the lead rôles, (Claire Winton), in the Suspense (radio drama), episode, 'The Kettler Method'.

Stuart asked her former agents to get her work. Her first movie in four years, Here Comes Elmer (1943), was a comedy with music starring Roy Rogers' wife, Dale Evans. In The Whistler (1944)—an early directing credit of the horror specialist, William Castle—Stuart co-starred with Richard Dix. In her following film, Enemy of Women (1944), a war-themed drama, Stuart was seventh in billing. Two years later, Stuart took one more role: she wore a redhead's wig in She Wrote the Book a comedy starring Joan Davis and Jack Oakie.

=== 1945–1974: Art career ===
An example of découpage by Stuart

After abandoning her acting career in 1945, Stuart went to New York with husband Sheekman—Paramount sent him to see the new play Dream Girl, wanting him to adapt it for to screen. A friend took Stuart to the studio of a découpage artist. Drawn to the art form, Stuart thought it could replace acting in her life. With Sheekman's encouragement, she opened a shop on Los Angeles's decorators' row, named it Décor, Ltd. Stuart created découpaged lamps, mirrors, tables, chests and other one of a kind objets d'art. Over the next four years, her work gained attention, and her pieces were carried by Lord & Taylor in New York, Neiman Marcus in Dallas, Bullock's in Pasadena and Gump's in San Francisco. But in time, labor involved in "the fine fine cutting, applying sixteen coats of lacquer" to every piece and other costs proved prohibitive, and Stuart closed her shop.

After living in rented spaces for ten years, Stuart and Sheekman bought an old craftsman-style house, where she redesigned the interior, supervised the remodeling, designed all the furniture and had it custom made. In the garden, she planned the landscaping, included a green house for orchids and lath house for grafting fruit trees, spent hours on her knees cultivating and planting. In Stuart's words, "I became a whirling dervish of creative renovation."

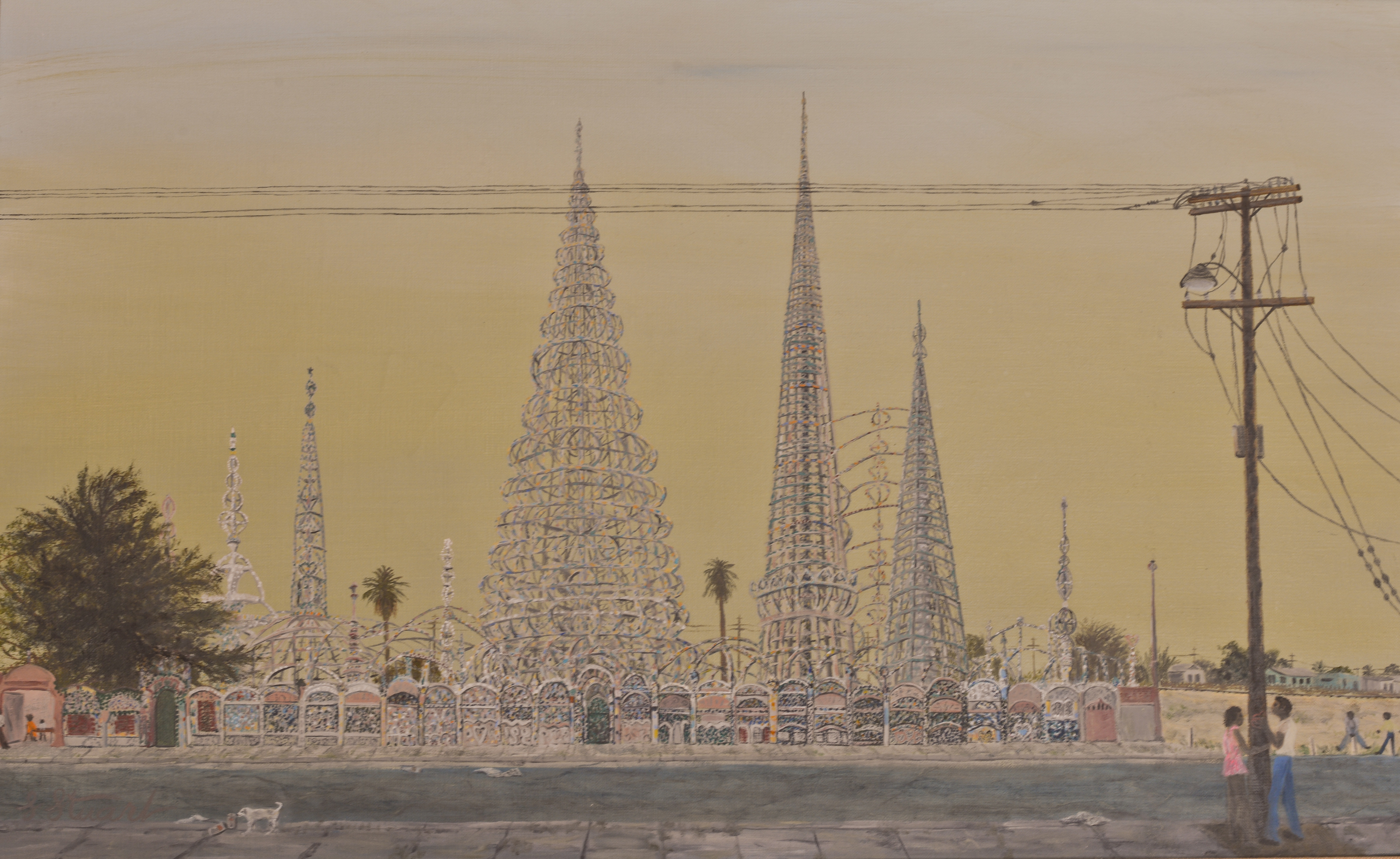
One of Stuart's Watts Towers prints (1972)

Early in 1954, visiting Paris, Stuart first saw the Impressionist paintings at the Jeu de Paume museum. As when she first saw découpage, Stuart wanted to do it, too. The Sheekmans were on their way to Italy. At the time, American artists living abroad for at least eighteen months paid no taxes on income earned during the residency. Sheekman was now very successful. In the eight years since returning from New York, he had been on fourteen movies, mostly writing the screenplays. He wanted to try another play. For the next eighteen months, Stuart painted and Sheekman worked on his play.

Sheekman's comedy about a sorrowful comic, The Joker, had Tommy Noonan for its star and was booked into The Playhouse Theater in New York to open April 5, 1957. On April 1, it was announced the play was terminating a pre-Broadway tour of three-and-one-half weeks in Washington, D.C., and was "taken off for repairs." Repairs were never made. Then after seven years of working at her easel every day, Stuart was ready to show her paintings. In September 1961, Victor Hammer gave Stuart a debut one-woman show at his Hammer Galleries in New York. Nearly all of her forty canvases sold. In the following years, Stuart exhibited her primitive-style paintings in many shows, including at the Bianchini Gallery in New York, the Simon Patrich Galleries and The Egg and the Eye in Los Angeles, the Galerie du Jonelle in Palm Springs and the Staircase Gallery in Beverly Hills. Stuart's paintings are in numerous private collections and the permanent collections of the Los Angeles County Museum of Art, the J. Paul Getty Museum, the Metropolitan Museum of Art, the Victoria and Albert Museum, the Museum of New Mexico (Santa Fe), the Desert Museum of Palm Springs and the Belhaven Museum (Jackson, Mississippi).

Stuart had been painting for nearly thirty years when, as she wrote, "... the challenges to me of painting as a primitive had been wearing a little thin, and I had become fascinated by the complex art form of serigraphy—silk screening." Stuart studied with serigrapher Evelyn Johnson, then created vivid serigraphs that are also in private collections.

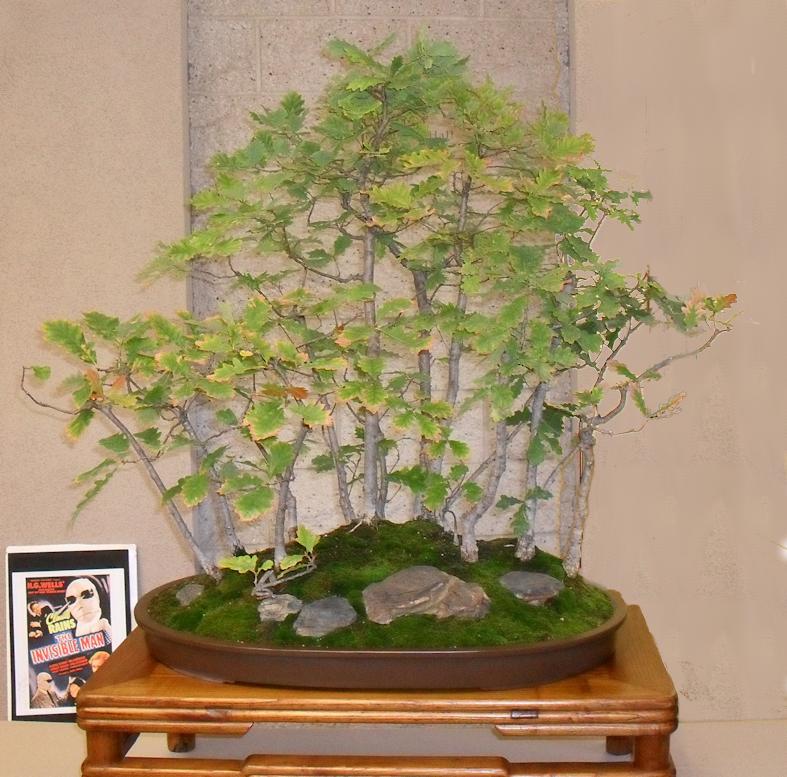
Bonsai called "French Black Oak Forest" was created by Stuart in 1982 after returning from France where she gathered the acorns in the royal forest at Fontainebleau

In the late 1960s, Stuart embraced another art form, the art of bonsai. She took classes from Frank Nagata, colleague of John Naka, a bonsai master in Los Angeles, joined Nagata's bonsai club, Baiko-En, and became one of the first Anglo members of the California Bonsai Society. Eventually Stuart's collection numbered over one hundred miniature trees.

=== 1975–1995: Return to acting; book design ===
In 1975, after nearly thirty years out of the business, Stuart decided to return to acting. She got an agent and was immediately cast in a small role as a customer in a store in the ABC television film The Legend of Lizzie Borden starring Elizabeth Montgomery. From there, through her agent, Stuart was able to get cast in bit parts, mostly in television— including guest appearances on series such as The Waltons and Murder, She Wrote. Her friend, director Nancy Malone, gave her a leading role in Merlene of the Movies, a quirky film for television, and other friends gave her parts in their shows. In 1982 came My Favorite Year. Although Stuart's scene lasted moments and she had no lines, she was dancing with Peter O'Toole. She wrote, "It was a great privilege to work with him." After that, Stuart was in Jack Lemmon's drama Mass Appeal and Goldie Hawn's comedy Wildcats, then more bits and pieces in television. A vintage publicity photo of her was also used for the image of 'Peg', the sister of butler Alfred Pennyworth, in the 1997 film Batman & Robin.

Stuart's husband Arthur Sheekman died in January 1978. Five years later, Ward Ritchie, a close friend of Stuart's first husband, Gordon Newell, sent Stuart one of his books. Ritchie had become a celebrated printer, book designer and printing historian. With his commercial Ward Ritchie Press and private Laguna Verde Imprenta press, Ritchie produced distinguished books on the arts, poetry, cookery and the American West. Stuart invited him to dinner, and they fell in love. Ritchie was seventy-eight and Stuart seventy-two. When Stuart first followed Ritchie into his studio and watched him pull a printed page from his 1839 English iron Albion hand press, she wanted to do it, too. After studying typesetting at the Women's Workshop in Los Angeles, Stuart bought her own hand press, a Vandercook SP15 and established her own private press, Imprenta Glorias. In 1984, Stuart was diagnosed with breast cancer, but successfully treated the disease with a lumpectomy followed by radiation.

In the late-1980s, Stuart began experimenting with making Artist's books. She designed several, wrote the text (often poetry), set the type—carefully selecting the style of type to match the subject—printed the pages, then decorated the pages with water colors, silk screen, découpage or all three. She created large artist's books and books in miniature. Several of her books took her years to complete. One of them, completed in 1996 with artist Don Bachardy, is owned by the Metropolitan Museum of Art.

Through Ritchie, Stuart was introduced to prestigious librarians and bibliophiles from San Francisco to Paris. Imprenta Glorias books can be found in the Bibliothèque nationale de France, the Huntington Library, J. Paul Getty Museum, the Library of Congress, the Los Angeles Public Library, the Metropolitan Museum of Art, the Morgan Library & Museum, the New York Public Library, the Occidental College Library, the Princeton University library, the UCLA Clark Library, the Victoria and Albert Museum as well as private collections. Stuart and Ritchie were together for thirteen years until his death from pancreatic cancer in 1996.

=== 1996–1998: Titanic; career resurgence ===
In May 1996, Stuart received a message about a film role: "A female voice said she was calling from Lightstorm Entertainment ... about a movie to be shot on location, maybe Poland ... about the Titanic, directed by James Cameron ..." The next afternoon, Cameron's casting director, Mali Finn, came to Stuart's house "... with her assistant, Emily Schweber, who was carrying a video camera ... Mali and I talked while Emily filmed us." The next morning, Finn brought over James Cameron and his video camera. Stuart wrote, "I was not the least bit nervous. I knew I would read Old Rose with the sympathy and tenderness that Cameron had intended ..." Five days after Stuart's eighty-sixth birthday, Finn phoned again and asked, "Gloria, how would you like to be Old Rose?"

Most of Stuart's filming was completed in Halifax, Nova Scotia, over about three weeks in early summer of 1996. Stuart also filmed and made recordings for several documentaries, did more looping and dubbing for Cameron, and received offers for additional films. Stuart wrote: "On April 7, 1997, the publicity blitz for Titanic kicked off... From that point on, the deluge of publicity never stopped." On December 17, 1997, Stuart was nominated for a Golden Globe Award for Best Supporting Actress for her performance in the film. She was also nominated for an Academy Award for Best Supporting Actress. She was one of the few Golden Age stars to attend the ceremony, with contemporaries Fay Wray, Bob Hope, and Milton Berle also attending. As of 2022, she remains the oldest nominee in the category. Stuart later parodied her role in a music video for the Hanson song "River" alongside "Weird Al" Yankovic who also directed the video.

On March 8, 1998, the Screen Actors Guild awarded Stuart its Founders Award, and also won the award for Best Performance by an Actress in a Supporting Role, tying with Kim Basinger (L.A. Confidential). For both awards, Stuart received a standing ovation from her peers.

The following May, People magazine included Stuart on their list of "The 50 most beautiful people in the World in 1998." Also in May, Stuart was guest of honor at the Great Steamboat Race between the Belle of Louisville and the Delta Queen and then was Grand Marshal of the 1998 Kentucky Derby Festival's Pegasus Parade.

Next, Stuart signed a contract with Little, Brown and Company to write her autobiography, I Just Kept Hoping. Stuart made her debut at The Hollywood Bowl on July 19, 1998, reading the poem, Standing Stone, Paul McCartney's oratorio for orchestra and chorus.

=== 1999–2010: Final years and accolades ===
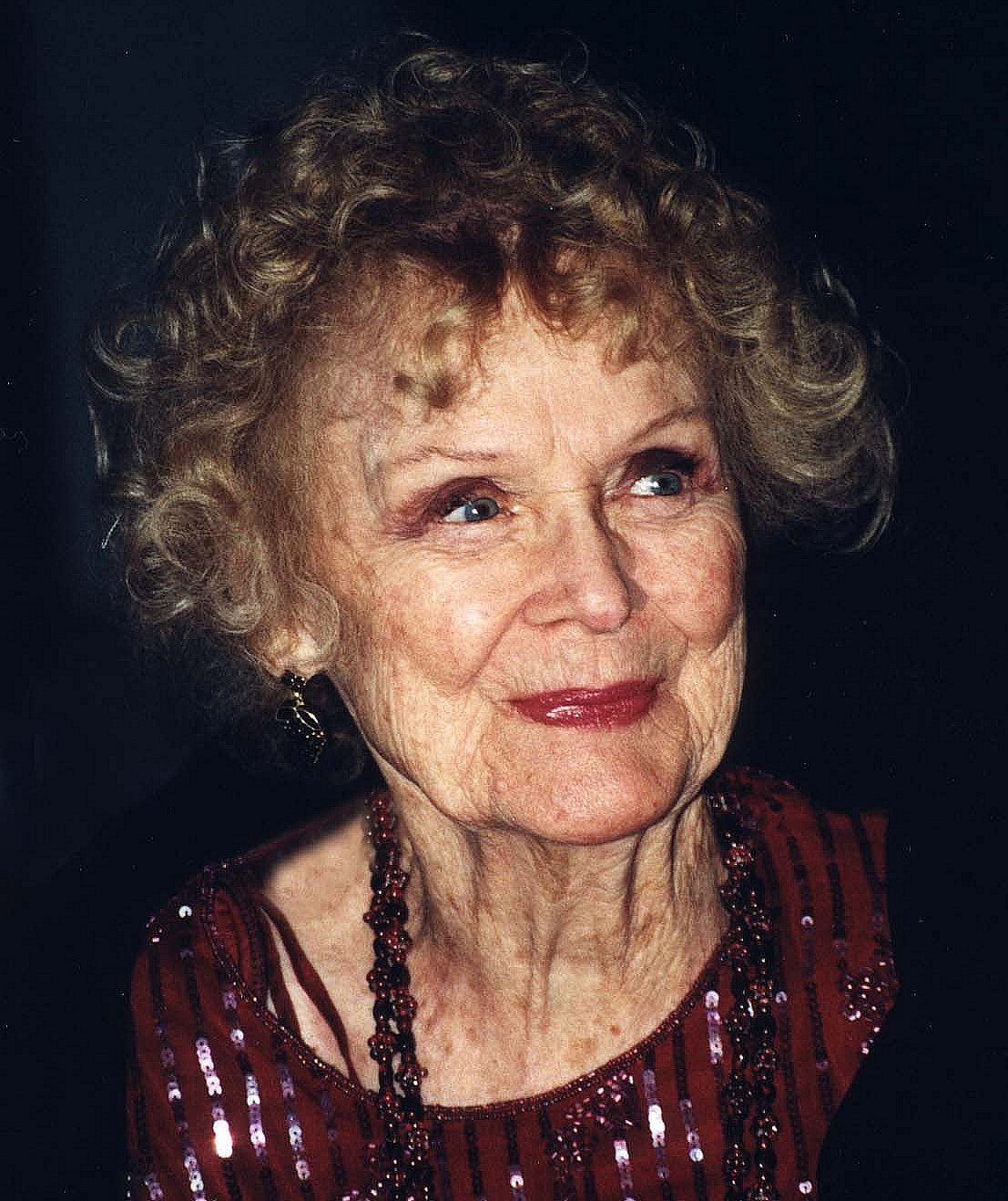
Stuart in 2000

Stuart was asked by the producer and star, Kate Capshaw, to join her cast of The Love Letter (1999), which she filmed in Rockport, Massachusetts. In October 1999, Stuart's native Santa Monica issued a Commendation signed by the mayor recognizing Gloria Stuart "... for many contributions world-wide and her inspirational message to always keep hoping. Dated this 16th day of October, 1999. Pam O'Connor, Mayor." In September 2000, Stuart unveiled her star on the Hollywood Walk of Fame, in front of the Pig 'n Whistle café that had opened its doors in 1927 when Stuart was still in high school. She also made guest appearances on several television series, including the 2000 science fiction series The Invisible Man; Touched by an Angel, and General Hospital. Although she was once again reduced to minor roles, Stuart's last two movies were for director Wim Wenders. In 1999, she worked on The Million Dollar Hotel in downtown Los Angeles. In 2004, she appeared in Wenders' Land of Plenty, her final film.

In 2006, Stuart donated her screen printing equipment to Mills College, where an exhibition of her work was held. On June 19, 2010, despite her illness, Stuart appeared in person to be honored by the Screen Actors Guild for her years of service. At a luncheon, she was presented the Ralph Morgan Award by Titanic co-star Frances Fisher. James Cameron and Shirley MacLaine were among the luncheon attendees. On July 22, 2010, The Academy of Motion Picture Arts and Sciences honored Stuart's career with a program featuring film clips and conversations between Stuart and film historian Leonard Maltin, portrait artist Don Bachardy and David S. Zeidberg, the Avery Director of the Huntington Library. One thousand people filled the Samuel Goldwyn Theater.

From the time Stuart was announced in the Titanic cast, she appeared before the camera for interviews on subjects as diverse as Groucho Marx, Shirley Temple, James Whale, horror movies and friends Christopher Isherwood and Don Bachardy.

Stuart was diagnosed with lung cancer at the age of 94, many decades after she had quit smoking. Until that point, she had enjoyed remarkably good health for her advanced age aside from taking cortisone shots for knee pain. She underwent radiation treatment, but in time the cancer returned and she underwent a shorter course of radiation. The malignancy continued to spread, but slowly due to her age. She died six years after her initial diagnosis and reached her centenary.

Stuart celebrated her 100th birthday on July 4, 2010, hosted by James Cameron and Suzy Amis as well as family and friends at the ACE Gallery in Beverly Hills. There Stuart saw many of her paintings and serigraphs, artist's books, samples of her découpage and trees from her bonsai collection exhibited in the gallery.

== Culinary interest ==
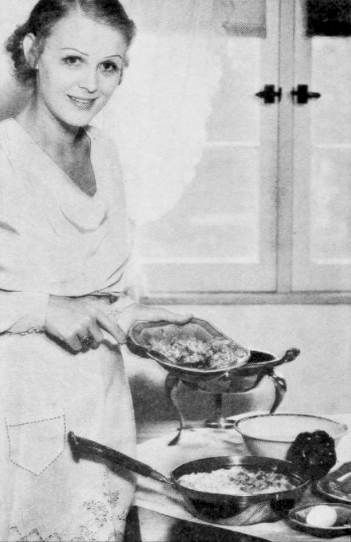
Stuart shown cooking in Photoplay, January 1933

Stuart was a skilled amateur chef and hosted frequent dinner parties in Hollywood. She was close friends with the American food writer M.F.K. Fisher, who was godmother to Stuart's daughter Sylvia Vaughn Thompson. Thompson later wrote about Stuart's cooking style: "My mother has never made Just Roast Beef in her life. It wouldn't interest her. Her style is based on the intricacies of composition. It borders on the baroque. Everyone adores it."

After tasting Stuart's goose in Kirschwasser aspic, the writer Samuel Hoffenstein composed a poem, which he comically said was inspired by "hearing the wings of all the poets brush thro' Gloria's kitchen."

Stuart's mother Alice was also an avid cook, producing specialties from the San Joaquin Valley, where Stuart's mother's family lived for generations.

== Activism and politics ==
Stuart was a lifelong Democrat. She was a co-founding member of the Hollywood Anti-Nazi League, which formed in 1936. In 1938, as a member of the Hollywood Democratic Committee, Stuart was on the executive board of the California State Democratic Committee. She was also an avid environmentalist. "I belong to every organization that has to do with saving the environment", said Stuart. "I'm fed up with venal and avaricious forestry people, mining people, oil people, gas people. I think the abuse of the environment is sinful."

== Death and legacy ==
Stuart died from respiratory failure at her home in Los Angeles on September 26, 2010, at age 100. Her body was cremated. At the time of her death, she had four grandchildren and twelve great-grandchildren.

Stuart's great-granddaughter, Deborah B. Thompson, produced an e-book, Butterfly Summers: A Memoir of Gloria Stuart's Apprentice.

For her contributions to the film industry, Stuart has a star on the Hollywood Walk of Fame. It is located on the 6700 block of Hollywood Boulevard.

== Accolades ==
Year	Awards	Category	Nominated work	Result	Ref.
1998	Academy Awards	Best Supporting Actress	Titanic	Nominated	
1998	Awards Circuit Community Awards	Best Supporting Actress	Titanic	Nominated	
1998	Golden Globe Awards	Best Supporting Actress	Titanic	Nominated	
1998	Kansas City Film Critics Circle Awards	Best Supporting Actress	Titanic	Won	
1998	Los Angeles Film Critics Association Awards	Best Supporting Actress	Titanic	2nd place	
1998	Online Film Critics Society Awards	Best Supporting Actress	Titanic	Won	
1998	Saturn Awards	Best Supporting Actress	Titanic	Won	
1998	Screen Actors Guild Awards	Outstanding Performance by a Cast in a Motion Picture	Titanic	Nominated	
1998	Screen Actors Guild Awards	Outstanding Performance by a Female Actor in a Supporting Role	Titanic	Won (Note: Tied with Kim Basinger for L.A. Confidential)	
2000	Eyegore Awards	Eyegore Award	—N/a	Honored	
2000	Walk of Fame	Motion Picture	—N/a	Honored	
2002	Long Beach International Film Festival	Lifetime Achievement Award	—N/a	Honored	
2010	Screen Actors Guild Awards	Ralph Morgan Award	—N/a	Honored	

== Selected artwork ==
=== Paintings ===
Year	Title	Medium	Notes	Ref.
1932	Still Life	Acrylic on canvas	Formerly owned by estate of Harpo Marx; auctioned in 2014	
1950s	Flossie and the Tiger	Oil on canvas	Owned by Papillion Gallery (Los Angeles)	
1954	House in Rapallo	Oil on canvas	Owned by Papillion Gallery	
1960s	Idiot's Bouquet – Melange	Oil on canvas	Owned by Papillion Gallery	
1960s	Two Nudes	Oil on canvas	Owned by Papillion Gallery	
1960s	Watts Towers	Oil on canvas	Owned by Los Angeles County Museum of Art	
1960s	Watts Towers with Kite	Oil on canvas	Owned by Los Angeles County Museum of Art	
1961	Girl in the Armoire	Oil on canvas	Owned by Papillion Gallery	
1961	Idiot's Bouquet – Hand	Oil on canvas	Owned by Papillion Gallery; exhibited at Hammer Gallery, New York in 1961	
1963	Idiot's Bouquet – with Wreath	Oil on canvas	Owned by Papillion Gallery	
1965	Adam and Eve	Oil on canvas	Owned by Papillion Gallery	
1970	Ladies in the Grass	Oil on canvas	Owned by Papillion Gallery	
1970s	Naming of the Animals	Oil on canvas	Owned by Papillion Gallery	

=== Screen prints ===
Year	Title	Medium	Notes	Ref.
—N/a	Le the Dasant	Silk screen	Signed along bottom in pencil; auctioned in 2012	

=== Artist's books ===
Year	Title	Medium	Notes	Ref.
1985	March fifteenth, Nineteen eighty-three	Letterpress, silkscreen, collage, and watercolor	Owned by William Andrews Clark Memorial Library	
1991	Eve-Venus	Letterpress, silkscreen, collage, and watercolor	Owned by the Metropolitan Museum of Art	
1993	Christopher Isherwood's Commonplace Book	Letterpress, silkscreen, collage, and watercolor	Owned by William Andrews Clark Memorial Library	
1993	Boating with Bogart	Letterpress, silkscreen	Owned by William Andrews Clark Memorial Library	
1996	The Portrait	Letterpress, silkscreen, collage, and watercolor	Collaboration with Don Bachardy; owned by the Metropolitan Museum of Art	
1997	The best motion picture of 1997: Titanic, by its author, director & producer James Cameron	Letterpress	Owned by William Andrews Clark Memorial Library	
2001	A Slight Diversion	Letterpress, silkscreen	Owned by William Andrews Clark Memorial Library	
