= Brember Wills =

English actor (1883–1948)

- Born: 15 March 1883; Reading, Berkshire, England
- Died: 29 September 1948 (aged 65); Los Angeles, California, United States
- Occupation: Actor
- Years active: 1905–?

Brember Wills (1883–1948) was an early 20th Century English theatre and film actor.

== Early life ==
Willis was born in Reading, in the County of Berkshire, England on 15 March 1883.

== Career ==
He made his acting debut on the stage in 1905.

His acting career was interrupted in 1914 by the outbreak of World War I, when he volunteered with the British Army's Royal Army Medical Corps as Private #600, and saw active service.

In July/August 1926 he performed in Henrik Ibsen's Pillars of Society at the Everyman Theatre in Hampstead, and at the Royalty Theatre in London. In March 1927 he performed with Charles Laughton and Sybil Thorndike in the play Angela, at the Prince's Theatre in London. He played Polonius in John Gielgud's 1930 production of Hamlet at The Old Vic.

In 1932 he was invited to Hollywood from the London stage by director James Whale, to perform (alongside Charles Laughton again), the role of insane Saul Femm in the film adaptation of J. B. Priestley's novel Benighted, titled The Old Dark House (1932).

In February 1935 he appeared in Gaston Baty's dramatized adaptation of Crime and Punishment at the Embassy Theatre in London, and in the same year also played the role of Ananias in a performance run of the Ben Jonson comedy The Alchemist at the Prince's Theatre. In January 1936 he appeared in the play 'Golden Gander' at the Embassy Theatre, in London. In January 1937 Wills appeared in an early British Broadcasting Corporation evening television broadcast of the play, Cinderella dramatized by his wife.

== Personal life ==
He was married to the theatre actress Margaret Carter, with whom he regularly performed on stage.

== Filmography ==
- Carnival (1931)
- The Old Dark House (1932)
- What Happened to Harkness? (1934)
- Unfinished Symphony (1934)
- The Scarlet Pimpernel (1934)

== Bibliography ==
- Bruce F. Kawin. Horror and the Horror Film. Anthem Press, 2012.
