= Benighted (novel) =

1927 novel by J. B. Priestley

- First edition
- Author: J. B. Priestley
- Language: English
- Genre: Drama, Thriller
- Publisher: Heinemann
- Publication date: October 1927
- Publication place: United Kingdom
- Media type: Print

Benighted (released in the United States as The Old Dark House) is a 1927 novel by the British writer J.B. Priestley. Priestley's second published novel, the story explores the post-First World War disillusionment that Britain felt during the time period. A number of travellers are forced to take shelter at an old Welsh country house during a storm. The book was released in the United States in 1928.

== Adaptations ==
It served as the basis for James Whale's film The Old Dark House in 1932 and its remake in 1963.

== Analysis ==
The book has been described as a study of British feeling following the First World War. Priestley himself described the book's characters as "forms of postwar pessimism pretending to be people". As an author, Priestley tended to pit characters against people and environments that took place outside their regular circumstances. Within the book, three travellers are taken in by a family, and they discover hidden dark secrets. The book draws on gothic literature elements. In particular, the book draws inspiration from the 1847 novel Jane Eyre.

== Bibliography ==
- Baxendale, John. Priestley’s England: J. B. Priestley and English culture. Manchester University Press, 2013.
- Gale, Maggie B. J.B. Priestley. Routledge, 2008.
- Goble, Alan. The Complete Index to Literary Sources in Film. Walter de Gruyter, 1999.
