= Duck Soup =

Marx Brothers film by Leo McCarey

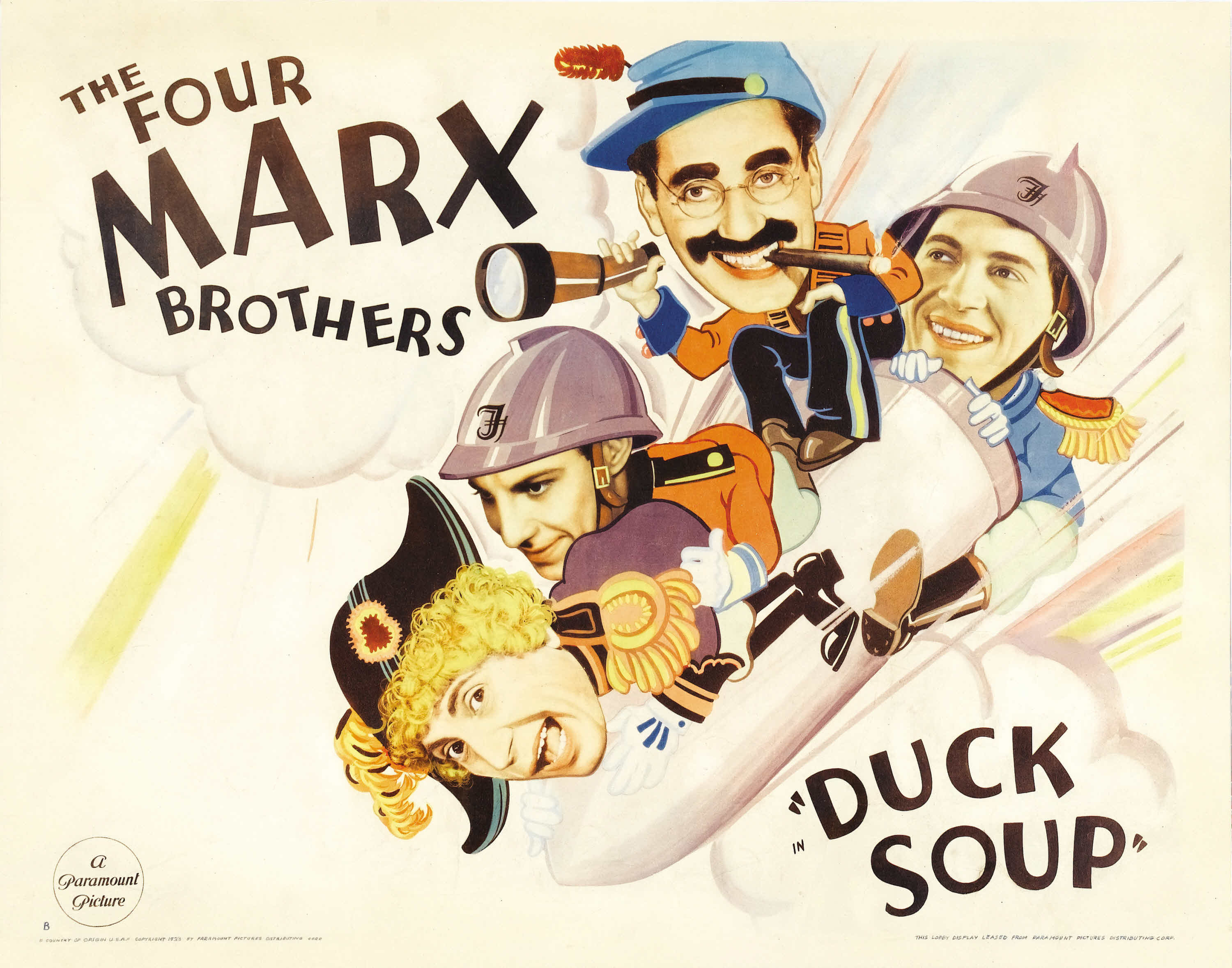
- Theatrical release poster L to R: Harpo, Zeppo, Groucho, Chico
- Directed by: Leo McCarey
- Written by: Bert Kalmar; Harry Ruby; Arthur Sheekman (additional dialogue); Nat Perrin (additional dialogue)
- Produced by: Herman J. Mankiewicz (uncredited)
- Starring: Groucho Marx; Harpo Marx; Chico Marx; Zeppo Marx; Margaret Dumont; Raquel Torres; Louis Calhern
- Cinematography: Henry Sharp
- Edited by: LeRoy Stone (uncredited)
- Music by: John Leipold (uncredited)
- Distributed by: Paramount Pictures
- Release date: November 17, 1933
- Running time: 68 minutes
- Country: United States
- Language: English

Trailer

Duck Soup is a 1933 American pre-Code musical comedy film written by Bert Kalmar and Harry Ruby (with additional dialogue by Arthur Sheekman and Nat Perrin) and directed by Leo McCarey. Released by Paramount Pictures on November 17, 1933, it stars the four Marx Brothers (Groucho, Harpo, Chico, and Zeppo) and also features Margaret Dumont, Louis Calhern, Raquel Torres and Edgar Kennedy.

Duck Soup was the final of the five Marx Brothers films released by Paramount Pictures. The film also marks Zeppo's last screen outing with his brothers. (Note: Zeppo retired from acting altogether after Duck Soup, becoming a talent agent.) In the film, Groucho portrays Rufus T. Firefly, the newly installed president of the fictional country of Freedonia. Zeppo is his secretary, while Chico and Harpo are spies for the neighboring country of Sylvania. Relations between Firefly and the Sylvanian ambassador (Calhern) deteriorate during the film, eventually leading the two countries to war.

Compared to the Marx Brothers' previous films, Duck Soup was a financial disappointment, though not an outright box-office failure as is sometimes reported. The film opened to mixed reviews, although this by itself did not end the group's association with Paramount. Bitter contract disputes, including a threat by the Marxes to leave and found their own production company, soured their negotiations with the studio just as Duck Soup went into production. After the film fulfilled their contractual obligations to Paramount, the Marxes and the studio agreed to part ways.

While contemporaneous critics of Duck Soup felt it did not quite rise to the level of its predecessors, critical and popular opinion has evolved and the film has since achieved the status of a classic. Duck Soup is now widely considered to be a masterpiece of comedy and the Marx Brothers' finest film.

In 1990, the United States Library of Congress deemed Duck Soup "culturally, historically, or aesthetically significant" and selected it for preservation in the National Film Registry.

== Plot ==
Wealthy widow Gloria Teasdale is asked to give twenty million dollars to the small, financially struggling nation of Freedonia; she agrees on the condition that Rufus T. Firefly is appointed the country's leader. Meanwhile, Ambassador Trentino of neighboring Sylvania is scheming to provoke a revolution in Freedonia in order to annex it. He sends two spies, Chicolini and Pinky, to Freedonia to find out information about Firefly. To his disappointment, Chicolini and Pinky end up spying on the wrong man, but he agrees to give them another chance.

To collect information on Firefly, Chicolini and Pinky pose as peanut vendors and station their food cart outside of Firefly's office. Firefly hires Chicolini as Freedonia's Secretary of War. A short time later, Firefly's secretary, Bob Roland, warns Firefly of this scheme. Roland advises Firefly to insult Trentino, hoping that he will slap Firefly in response; this would give Firefly an excuse to ban Trentino from the country. Firefly agrees to the plan, but after a series of personal insults exchanged with Trentino, the plan goes awry when Firefly slaps Trentino instead. The incident brings the two countries to the brink of war. Meanwhile, Firefly and Trentino both attempt to woo Mrs. Teasdale in the hopes of getting their respective hands on her late husband's wealth.

Trentino learns from Sylvanian spy Vera Marcal that Freedonia's plans of war are in Mrs. Teasdale's possession, and tells Vera to assist Chicolini and Pinky in stealing the plans. Chicolini is eventually caught by Firefly and put on trial, during which Firefly again slaps Trentino. This causes Trentino to declare war on Freedonia; overcome with excitement, everyone at the trial then begins singing and dancing. Chicolini and Pinky join Firefly and Roland in the anarchic battle that follows.

Some time later, Freedonia is losing the war and army morale is breaking down amidst a series of violent mishaps. Firefly, Chicolini, Pinky, Roland, and Teasdale take refuge in Teasdale's hideout, which is soon overrun by Sylvanian troops accompanied by Trentino. When the Freedonians recognize him, they pin him in a makeshift pillory and throw fruit at him. Trentino surrenders, but Firefly tells him that he will stay in the pillory "till the fruit runs out". When Mrs. Teasdale victoriously begins singing the Freedonian national anthem, the four men start throwing fruit at her instead.

== Cast ==
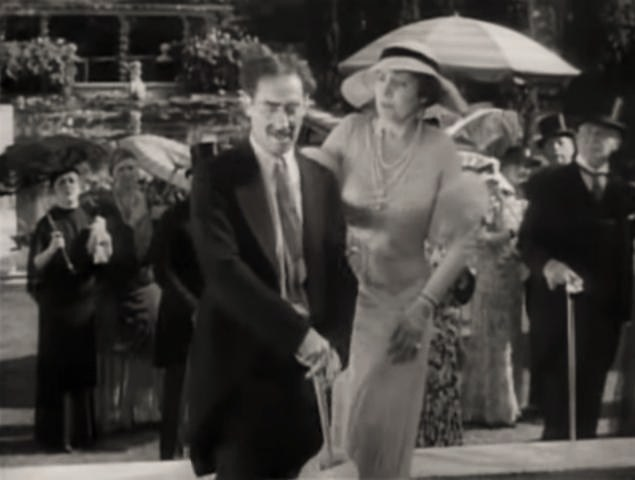
Groucho Marx and Margaret Dumont

- Groucho Marx as Rufus T. Firefly, the leader of Freedonia
- Harpo Marx as Pinky, a spy for Sylvania
- Chico Marx as Chicolini, another spy for Sylvania
- Zeppo Marx as Lt. Bob Roland, Firefly's secretary
- Margaret Dumont as Mrs. Gloria Teasdale, a rich widow who underwrites the budget of Freedonia
- Louis Calhern as Ambassador Trentino of Sylvania, who schemes to have his country annex Freedonia
- Raquel Torres as Vera Marcal, a femme fatale spying for Sylvania
- Edgar Kennedy as the blustery lemonade vendor
- Edmund Breese as Former President Zander, Firefly's predecessor
- Edwin Maxwell as the Secretary of War
- William Worthington as First Minister of Finance
- Davison Clark as Second Minister of Finance
- Charles Middleton as prosecutor
- Leonid Kinskey as Trentino's Sylvanian "agitator"
- Verna Hillie as Trentino's secretary
- George MacQuarrie as first judge
- Fred Sullivan as second judge
- Eric Mayne as third judge
- Wade Boteler as officer at battle headquarters (uncredited)
- Carrie Daumery as reception guest (uncredited)

=== Cast notes ===
Comparing the original scripts with the finished film, most of the characters' initial scripted names were later changed. Only the names of Chicolini and Mrs. Teasdale were kept. Groucho's character—originally named "Rufus T. Firestone"—eventually became Rufus T. Firefly, while the name of Harpo's character—named Pinky in the final product—was given in the Paramount pressbook as "Brownie". "Ambassador Frankenstein of Amnesia" was quickly changed to Ambassador Trentino of Sylvania. Zeppo's character remained Firefly's son until very late in production, finally becoming Bob Roland, his secretary; also, Mrs. Teasdale's niece "June Parker" transformed into Vera Marcal, first introduced as Trentino's "niece" before ultimately becoming his companion.

== Production ==
=== Development ===
The Marx Brothers' previous film, Horse Feathers, had been Paramount's highest-grossing film of 1932. Encouraged by this success, the studio suggested on August 2, 1932, that they rush out a follow-up. Already at this early stage, the story (provisionally entitled Oo La La) was set in a mythical kingdom. On August 11, 1932, the Los Angeles Times reported that production would commence in five weeks with the famed Ernst Lubitsch directing.

This was a turbulent time in the Marx Brothers' career. The Great Depression was raging and Paramount Pictures was attempting to stave off bankruptcy. A reorganization of the studio brought fears that money due the Marxes would never be paid; as a result, the Brothers threatened to leave Paramount and form their own company, Marx Bros., Inc. Their first planned independent production was a film adaptation of the Pulitzer Prize-winning Broadway musical Of Thee I Sing, with Norman McLeod leaving Paramount to direct. During late 1932 and early 1933, Groucho and Chico were also working on Flywheel, Shyster, and Flywheel, a radio show written by Nat Perrin and Arthur Sheekman; there was even, at one time, talk of casting the two as their radio characters for the new film, an idea that was eventually used by Perrin in the 1941 Marx Brothers film The Big Store.

By October 4, 1932, Arthur Sheekman, Harry Ruby, and Bert Kalmar began writing the screenplay for the next Paramount film, which was now called Firecrackers. Herman Mankiewicz was to supervise production, beginning in January 1933. By December 1932, Firecrackers had become Cracked Ice. Grover Jones was also reported to have contributed to the first draft by Ruby and Kalmar. In The Marx Brothers Encyclopedia, Glenn Mitchell says that "the first script's content is difficult to determine".

On January 18, 1933, Harry Ruby, Bert Kalmar and Grover Jones submitted to Paramount their "Second Temporary Script" for Cracked Ice, and Paramount announced that shooting would commence on February 15. This script shows that the basic plot of Duck Soup was in place. In February, Paramount announced that the title had been changed to Grasshoppers ("because animal stories are so popular"), and that filming was set back to February 20.

However, on May 11, 1933, the Marx Brothers' father Sam "Frenchie" Marx died in Los Angeles, and shortly afterward the contract dispute with Paramount was settled. The New York Post reported on May 17 that the Brothers would make a new comedy for Paramount, called Duck Soup. Leo McCarey was set for direction of the film. Three days later The New York Sun reported that Duck Soup would start filming in June. Duck Soup's script was completed by July 11. The script was a continuation of Ruby and Kalmar's Firecrackers/Cracked Ice drafts, but contained more elements. Many of the film's clever gags and routines were lifted from Flywheel, Shyster, and Flywheel, giving Perrin and Sheekman an "additional dialogue" credit.

=== Title ===
Director McCarey reportedly came up with the title for the film, having previously used it for an earlier directorial effort with Laurel and Hardy. This continued the "animal" titles of the Brothers' previous three films, Animal Crackers, Monkey Business and Horse Feathers.

"Duck soup" was American English slang referring to something easy to do. Conversely, "to duck something" meant to avoid it. When Groucho was asked for an explanation of the title, he quipped, "Take two turkeys, one goose, four cabbages, but no duck, and mix them together. After one taste, you'll duck soup for the rest of your life."

McCarey also thought up "the very Laurel & Hardy-like sequence in which Harpo and Chico stage a break-in at Mrs Teasdale's house." Another McCarey contribution was the "mirror scene", a revival of an old Marx Brothers vaudeville act.

=== Mirror scene ===
In the "mirror scene", Pinky, dressed as Firefly, pretends to be Firefly's reflection in a missing mirror, matching his every move—including absurd ones that begin out of sight—to near perfection. At one point, the two men swap positions, introducing the question of which is the reflection. Eventually, Chicolini, also disguised as Firefly, enters the frame and collides with both of them.

Although its appearance in Duck Soup is the best known instance, the concept of the mirror scene did not originate in this film. Harold Lloyd used essentially the same routine in his short The Marathon (1919). Max Linder included it in Seven Years Bad Luck (1921), where a man's servants have accidentally broken a mirror and attempt to hide the fact by imitating his actions in the mirror's frame. Charlie Chaplin used a similar joke in The Floorwalker (1916), though it did not involve a mirror.

This scene has been imitated many times; for instance, in the Bugs Bunny cartoon Hare Tonic, the Mickey Mouse cartoon Lonesome Ghosts, The Square Peg (1959), The Pink Panther (1963), the Tom and Jerry cartoon Cat and Dupli-cat (1967), Big Business (1988), the Donkey Kong Country show episode "Ape-Nesia" (1997), the X-Files episode "Dreamland" (1998), Garfield: A Tail of Two Kitties (2006), and the Family Guy episode "Road to Germany" (2008). Harpo himself did a reprise of this scene, dressed in his usual costume, with Lucille Ball also donning the fright wig and trench coat, in the I Love Lucy episode "Lucy and Harpo Marx".

=== Other scenes and jokes ===
The Arden Villa lily pond was a filming location.

Firefly (Groucho) is in Margaret Dumont's room, and unbeknownst to them, Chicolini (Chico) is hiding under the bed. When Groucho leaves the room, she turns her back to prepare for bed and Chico gets up from under the bed, and when she turns around, she is startled to still see him:

"Your Excellency, I thought you left."
"Oh no, I no leave."
"But I saw you with my own eyes."
"Well, who ya gonna believe, me or your own eyes?"

The climactic production number ridicules war by comparing nationalism to a minstrel show. One segment is a variant on the old Negro spiritual "All God's Chillun Got Wings":

They got guns,
We got guns,
All God's chillun got guns!
I'm gonna walk all over the battlefield,
'Cause all God's chillun got guns!

(The song makes a reprise in the 1937 Marx Brothers film A Day at the Races as "All God's Chillun Got Rhythm" in the Lindy Hop production number.)

Another repeated gag involved Harpo, who drives a motorcycle with a sidecar, as a chauffeur, to transport Groucho. Twice, after Groucho gives the orders to Harpo, Harpo rides his motorcycle away, leaving Groucho stranded in the sidecar. Later, Groucho has Harpo sit in the sidecar, while Groucho gets on the motorcycle, the sidecar, with Harpo in it, rides off away, again, leaving Groucho stranded.

Shortly after, during the final battle scenes, "rightfully [...] called the funniest of all of cinema", Firefly can be seen wearing a different costume in almost every sequence until the end of the film, including American Civil War uniforms (first Union and then Confederate), a British palace guard uniform, a Boy Scout Scoutmaster's uniform, and even a Davy Crockett coonskin cap. Meanwhile, the exterior view of the building they are occupying changes appearance from a bunker to an old fort, etc. One of Firefly's generals assures him that he has "a man combing the countryside for volunteers." Sure enough, Pinky is wandering out on the front lines wearing a sandwich board sign reading, "Join the Army and see the Navy." Later, Chicolini volunteers Pinky to carry a message through enemy lines; Firefly tells him, "[...] and remember, while you're out there risking life and limb through shot and shell, we'll be in here thinking what a sucker you are." Thomas Doherty has described this line as "sum[ming] up the Great War cynicism towards all things patriotic".

The melodramatic exclamation "This means war!" certainly did not originate with Duck Soup, but it is used several times in the film—at least twice by Trentino and once by Firefly—and was repeated by Groucho in A Night at the Opera and A Day at the Races. Variations of this phrase later became a frequently used catch-phrase for Daffy Duck and Bugs Bunny in Warner Bros. cartoons.

In another scene, the film pokes fun at the Hays Code. Due to the code, a man and woman could not be shown in bed together. The camera begins the scene in a woman's bedroom, panning across the foot of the bed. A pair of men's shoes are shown on the floor, then a pair of women's shoes and then four horseshoes. The camera cuts to a shot of the entire room: Pinky is sleeping in one bed with the horse, while the woman is in another bed.

The film's writers recycled a joke used in Horse Feathers in this dialogue with Chico:

Prosecutor: Chicolini, isn't it true you sold Freedonia's secret war code and plans?
Chicolini: Sure! I sold a code and two pairs o' plans!

The street vendor confrontations are also examples of well-crafted pieces of physical comedy: Chico and Harpo harass a lemonade seller (comedy film veteran Edgar Kennedy), egged on by his irritation that they have stolen his pitch.

First, there is a scene involving the knocking off, dropping, picking up and exchanging of hats. Later, Kennedy (a much larger man) steals bags of Harpo's peanuts, and Harpo responds by burning Kennedy's new straw boater hat; in return, Kennedy pushes over their peanut wagon. Harpo responds by stepping knee-deep into Kennedy's lemonade tank, where he imitates a stereotypical Italian grape-crushing peasant; this drives off Kennedy's waiting line of customers.

Just before the Mirror Scene is the Radio Scene. Harpo tries the combination to the safe on a box which proves to be a radio, and it starts blaring the break-up strain of John Philip Sousa's "Stars and Stripes Forever". The music continues despite frantic efforts to silence, and finally destroy, the radio, by throwing it out the window, shattering the glass.

Harpo often doffed his hat on-screen, but Chico very rarely removed his Tyrolean hat, even when indoors. For a few seconds on-screen in the earlier scene, Chico's head is uncovered, revealing a wavy wig. Chico had already started going bald when the brothers appeared in their first Broadway production, I'll Say She Is, in 1924. All of the Brothers' natural receding-hairline patterns were similar, but Harpo and Chico covered theirs with wigs (Groucho later sported an obvious toupee in the films At The Circus and Go West).

== Soundtrack ==
Duck Soup is the only Marx film without Chico's piano and Harpo's harp solos, although Harpo briefly plays the "harp" on the strings of a piano.

The musical introduction to Groucho's character is similar to those in Animal Crackers and Horse Feathers, but it did not become closely associated with him as did "Hooray for Captain Spaulding" from Animal Crackers.

Zeppo, described by James Agee as "a peerlessly cheesy improvement on the traditional straight man", sings the opening lines of the first song, "When the Clock on the Wall Strikes 10". He also sings with the others in "The Country's Going to War", filling out the four-cornered symmetry as the Brothers sing and dance in pairs during the number.

=== Original songs by Kalmar and Ruby ===
The "Freedonia National Anthem" is used frequently throughout the film, both as vocal and instrumental; the entire song seems to consist of "Hail, Hail, Freedonia, land of the brave and free", contrasting with the final line of "The Star-Spangled Banner". The "Sylvania theme", which sounds vaguely like an amalgamation of "Rule, Britannia!" and "God Save the King", is also used several times. "When The Clock On The Wall Strikes 10", the first musical number in the film, is part of the same scene as "Just Wait 'Til I Get Through With It", Groucho's song about the laws of his administration. "The Country's Going To War" is the final musical ensemble in the film. Technically it is the only musical number in the Marx Brothers' films to feature all four of the brothers. However, in Monkey Business, Chico briefly bangs on the piano while the other three play saxophones while eluding their pursuers on an ocean liner.

The introductory scene, showing ducks swimming in a kettle and quacking merrily, is scored with an instrumental medley of the aforementioned songs, and it is also the only scene in the film that has to do with ducks and soup.

=== Non-original music ===
- Military Polonaise (Chopin) – played over newspaper headline of Firefly's appointment as president of Freedonia
- "Sailor's Hornpipe"; "Dixie" – short segments embedded in "These Are the Laws of My Administration"
- "Who's Afraid of the Big Bad Wolf" – music box, accompanied by Harpo on (simulated) harp, briefly; a few minutes later, in another scene, Groucho says "I'll huff and I'll puff and I'll blow your door in" after he is locked in a closet. Walt Disney filed a lawsuit against Paramount Pictures, for using the song without permission, resulting in Disney winning the financial damages in a settlement.
- "Stars and Stripes Forever" (Sousa) – on radio, turned on (loudly) by Harpo, who mistakes the radio dial for a combination dial on a safe.
- "American Patrol" (Frank W. Meacham) – three of the Brothers playing soldiers' helmets like a xylophone as they march by, while Harpo clips off the decorative tassels (part of a running gag in the film)
- "All God's Chillun Got Guns" (parody of "All God's Chillun Got Wings"); "Oh Freedonia" (parody of "Oh! Susanna"); "Turkey in the Straw" (instrumental) – embedded in "Freedonia's Going to War"
- Light Cavalry Overture (Franz von Suppé) – Harpo galloping on horseback a la Paul Revere
- "Ain't She Sweet" (Milton Ager/Jack Yellen) – Harpo watching girl in window
- "Goodnight, Sweetheart" (Ray Noble) – Harpo and same girl (Edgar Kennedy's character's wife)
- Generic cavalry charge – Harpo with horn, in bathtub with Edgar Kennedy
- "One Hour With You" (Oscar Straus/Richard A. Whiting) – Harpo with another girl and his horse — segué into a bit of "The Old Gray Mare"
- "El manisero" (Moisés Simons) – half-sung, half-muttered by Groucho to himself at various points

== Reception ==
Groucho in one of the many costumes he wore in the war sequence of Duck Soup

Although Duck Soup did not perform as well as Horse Feathers, it was the sixth-highest-grossing film of 1933, according to Glenn Mitchell in The Marx Brothers Encyclopedia and Simon Louvish in Monkey Business. However, Duck Soup was a box office disappointment for Paramount.

One possible reason for the film's lukewarm reception is that it was released during the depths of the Great Depression. Audiences were taken aback by its cynicism at a time of economic and political crisis. According to Leonard Maltin in The Great Movie Comedians:

As wonderful as Monkey Business, Horse Feathers, and Duck Soup seem today, some critics and moviegoers found them unpleasant and longed for the more orderly world of The Cocoanuts with its musical banalities. [...] Many right-thinkers laughed themselves silly in 1933—but a large number didn't. [...] The unrelieved assault of Marxian comedy was simply too much for some people.

Years later, Groucho's son Arthur Marx described Irving Thalberg's assessment of the film's purported failure during a National Public Radio interview:

[Thalberg] said the trouble with Duck Soup is you've got funny gags in it, but there's no story and there's nothing to root for. You can't root for the Marx Brothers because they're a bunch of zany kooks. [Thalberg] says, "You gotta put a love story in your movie so there'll be something to root for, and you have to help the lovers get together."

The film opened to mixed reviews. Most critics at the time disliked Duck Soup because of its "dated" look at politics. Christopher Null believes that "the send-up of Mussolini-types doesn't quite pan out. Take the comedy, leave the story."

Groucho did not initially think highly of the film. When asked the significance of the film's politics, Groucho only shrugged and said: "What significance? We were just four Jews trying to get a laugh." (Note: Danel Griffin elaborates on this quote from Groucho at his website: "I've always been on the fence about this one. In my write-up, of course, I argue that even if the Marxes didn't intend any deeper significance, one still exists that its longevity has created. And of course, it's impossible to tell when Groucho is being sarcastic and when he isn't. But that he communicated with T. S. Eliot, Antonin Artaud, Dalí, etc., all who praised the Brothers' work, means that he was at least aware of the various readings of the film, and he engaged them on some level. I suspect that his outspoken opinion of Duck Soup simply changed over time. While the Brothers were still active, they were infamously embarrassed by the Paramount films—hard to believe it, but there was a time when the Thalberg collaborations were actually considered better. Perhaps the "four Jews trying to get a laugh" comment was a dismissive one he made towards that era in general. Towards the end of his lifetime, critics reexamined the Paramounts and embraced them, and perhaps this gave Groucho incentive to finally admit that the film indeed was an intentional, biting satire. But who knows? Part of the charm of the Marx Brothers is that it's impossible to know where they're channeling.) Nevertheless, the Brothers were ecstatic when Mussolini took the film as a personal insult and banned it in Italy. Residents of Fredonia, New York, also protested the film because they feared that the similar-sounding nation would hurt their city's reputation. The Marx Brothers quipped in response, telling them to change the name of their town to keep from hurting their movie.

Despite the tepid critical and commercial response at the time, Duck Soup is now seen as a classic political farce. Film critic Danel Griffin believes that Duck Soup is "on par with other war comedies like Chaplin's The Great Dictator and Kubrick's Dr. Strangelove, only slightly more unnerving in that Duck Soup doesn't seem to realize it is anything more than innocent fluff." Fellow film critic Roger Ebert believed, "The Marx Brothers created a body of work in which individual films are like slices from the whole, but Duck Soup is probably the best." British film critic Barry Norman considered Duck Soup the Marx Brothers' best work, and included it in his list of the 100 best films of the 20th century.

Revived interest in the film during the 1960s and '70s dovetailed with the counterculture of the era. American literary critic Harold Bloom considers the end of Duck Soup one of the greatest works of American art produced in the 20th century.

In 1990, Duck Soup was selected for preservation in the United States National Film Registry by the Library of Congress as being "culturally, historically, or aesthetically significant". In 2000, readers of Total Film magazine voted Duck Soup the 29th greatest comedy film of all time. On Rotten Tomatoes, the film has a 91% rating based on 55 reviews, with an average rating of 9.2/10. The site's critical consensus reads, "Fueled by inspired silliness and blessed with some of the Marx brothers' most brilliant work, Duck Soup is one of its – or any – era's finest comedies". It is also one of the earliest films to appear on Roger Ebert's list of The Great Movies.

The film is recognized by American Film Institute in these lists:

- AFI's 100 Years... 100 Movies – #85
- AFI's 100 Years... 100 Laughs – #5
- AFI's 100 Years... 100 Movies (10th Anniversary Edition) – #60

It also placed 7th in Variety Magazine's top 100 comedies of all time.

=== Influence ===
The United States Library of Congress has added Duck Soup to the National Film Registry, and the film was included in both the original (1998) broadcast of AFI's 100 Years... 100 Movies and the 2007 update.

Another testament to Duck Soup's legacy is its influence on Woody Allen's films. Near the end of Allen's Hannah and Her Sisters (1986), a chance screening of Duck Soup convinces Allen's character that life is still worth living, and he abandons his suicidal impulses. His earlier Bananas (1971), a film chronicling the humorous rise of an unlikely dictator, has been dubbed a "spiritual sequel to Duck Soup."

Duck Soup is also frequently cited as a major influence on the comedic side of The Beatles, and The Beatles themselves admitted that it was an inspiration for their film Help!

The film has influenced animation as well, with homages appearing in various animated television series. It was spoofed in Animaniacs as the full-episode sketch "King Yakko". One specific gag from the original, the constant singing of the Freedonian national anthem, was spoofed in particular with a Perry Como caricature. Groucho's entrance in the film was borrowed in another Animaniacs cartoon, "The Three Muska-Warners".

The film also inspired parts of Sacha Baron Cohen's 2012 film The Dictator. A critic for The A.V. Club noted that "Admiral General Aladeen and Rufus T. Firefly share the same bloodline, representing a more generalized contempt for world leaders of any stripe, whether they don a 'supreme beard' or a greasepaint moustache." The Nashville Scene considered the film to be "an echo here of that funniest of xenophobe-baiting funnies, Duck Soup." Rolling Stone claimed that Baron Cohen's film "dodges soothing convention and ultimately merits comparisons to The Marx Brothers' Duck Soup and Charlie Chaplin's The Great Dictator."

The company FASA, which publishes role-playing games, derives its name from an imaginary Freedonian version of NASA, the "Freedonian Aeronautics and Space Administration".

== Home media ==
Universal Home Video released Duck Soup on DVD, unrestored but uncut, as part of a two-disc box set The Marx Brothers: Silver Screen Collection, which includes also the Brothers' other Paramount films, The Cocoanuts, Animal Crackers, Monkey Business, and Horse Feathers. Reviewing the set, film critic Mark Bourne writes:

Shortly before this DVD set hit the streets, a pre-release report by nationally syndicated entertainment columnist Marilyn Beck stated that "racially-offensive material" would be edited from this edition of Duck Soup. Specifically, material "that has been deplored and debated in the 'We're Going to War' production number." Beck didn't say what the exact cut was, or who's doing all that deploring and debating, though presumably she meant the "All God's Chillun Got Guns" section. The possibility of new contextually obtuse editing is bad enough. What made her column even more galling was the satisfied tone in her statement that such a "well-made edit makes the film a pure zany joy without an ugly blot in it to spoil the fun." It's a pleasure to report that Marilyn Beck is full of it. No such edits exist in this edition. Another potentially sensitive moment in the film — Groucho's punchline, "and that's why darkies were born", a dated reference to a popular song from the '30s — is also still intact.

== See also ==
- List of cult films
- List of United States comedy films
- Freedonia
- Kalmar and Ruby songwriting team
- National Recovery Administration (NRA), the logo displayed at start of film
