= Sol Violinsky =

Russian-American entertainer (1885-1963)

- Violinsky in The Eccentric Entertainer (1929)
- Born: Sol Ginsberg; June 4, 1885; Kiev Governorate, Russian Empire
- Died: May 5, 1963 (aged 77); Binghamton, New York
- Other name: Solly Ginsburg
- Occupations: Violinist, songwriter

Sol Violinsky (July 4, 1885 – May 5, 1963), born Sol Ginsberg, was a Jewish-Russian, American violinist, pianist, composer and songwriter.

== Life and Career ==
Sol Violinsky, sometimes credited as Solly Ginsburg, was born in Kyiv, Kiev Governorate, Russian Empire (now Kyiv, Ukraine) on July 4, 1885. He came to America in 1901 and began working in Vaudeville, where he was known for playing the violin and piano at the same time. Violinsky starred in the 1929 short, The Eccentric Entertainer, where he performed his act.

As a songwriter, he contributed several songs (mostly uncredited), such as I'm Daffy Over You, Dormitory Number, Have a Good Time, and Stay With It, for films by the Marx Brothers (Animal Crackers, Monkey Business and Horse Feathers) and Les Brown and his band. His song, When Frances Dances With Me, was made popular in 1921 by phonograph recording stars Ada Jones and Billy Murray. He published several well known songs under the pseudonym, "Violinsky", such as That Carolina Rag, You Left Me Out In The Rain, and Congo Nights, from Raymond Hitchcock's 1920 musical revue Hitchy-Koo.

Violinsky also played violin with the New York Symphony. He died at Our Lady of Lourdes Hospital in Binghamton, New York on May 5, 1963.
