= The Mad, Mad, Mad Comedians =

1970 animated TV special

- Official logo
- Genre: Animated television special
- Written by: Romeo Muller (special material)
- Directed by: Arthur Rankin, Jr. Jules Bass
- Starring: (See article)
- Theme music composer: Maury Laws
- Country of origin: United States
- Original language: English

Production
- Producers: Arthur Rankin, Jr. Jules Bass
- Cinematography: Steve Nakagawa (animation supervisor)
- Editor: Irwin Goldress
- Running time: 25 minutes
- Production companies: Rankin/Bass Productions; Atlantic Records (Flip Wilson segment); Mushi Studios (animation)

Original release
- Network: ABC
- Release: April 7, 1970

The Mad, Mad, Mad Comedians is a 1970 American animated television special produced by Rankin/Bass Productions. After the Christmas special Frosty the Snowman (1969), it was Rankin/Bass' second hand-drawn animated work to be outsourced to Osamu Tezuka's Mushi Production in Tokyo, Japan. The show aired on ABC on April 7, 1970 before the airing of that year's Oscars. It was a tribute to early vaudeville, and featured animated reworkings of various famous comedians' acts.

== Production ==
Most of the comedians provided their own voices for their animated counterparts, except for Chico Marx and W. C. Fields, both deceased, and Zeppo Marx, who had left show business in 1933. Harpo Marx was also deceased, but required no voice work. Voice actor Paul Frees narrated the show and filled in for those actors who were not able to do their own voices.

The show includes a Marx Brothers skit, which is a reworking of a scene from their Broadway play I'll Say She Is (1924). The skit includes their famous Napoleon parody, with Napoleon played by Groucho. Romeo Muller is credited as having written special material for the show in addition to the original scripts that came from the various comedians' sketches.

This special and Santa Claus Is Comin' to Town, released later that year, gave Rankin/Bass their highest TV ratings, even higher than Rudolph the Red-Nosed Reindeer (1964). More recently, Behr Entertainment was in talks to produce a similar show that would feature cartoon renditions of Jack Benny, George Burns, Abbott and Costello, and Bob Hope. Thirteen half-hour episodes were proposed.

== Plot ==
The majority of the special is an animated vaudeville-style show featuring numerous comedians performing the greatest skits at the palace.

- Flip Wilson's "Columbus" sketch (with audio taken directly from his 1967 Atlantic Records album Cowboys and Colored People) is set to animation, as Queen Isabel Johnson sends Christopher Columbus to the New World to find, among other things, Ray Charles.
- Jack Benny and George Burns take a trip in Jack's infamous Maxwell, where Jack attempts to weasel his way out of paying an increased bridge toll.
- Groucho Marx recreates the Napoleon parody act from the Marx Brothers' 1925 Broadway revue I'll Say She Is, with Groucho reprising his role as Napoleon, and animated representations of Chico, Zeppo, and Harpo playing his advisors Alphonse, Francois, and Gaston, respectively.
- W. C. Fields (voiced here by voice actor and comedian Paul Frees) has trouble trying to prove that he is a sportsman and impress a woman to marry her daughter at the ski resort, while at the same time he also has a comical encounter with a Saint Bernard.
- The Smothers Brothers try their best to cooperate in singing a song to woo a princess, but their attempt does not go as planned.

In between the skits, various comedians including Henny Youngman, Jack E. Leonard, George Jessel, and Phyllis Diller tell a few funny jokes as the TV special progresses. Also making silent cameos in the special are Dean Martin, Jerry Lewis, Ray Charles, Charlie Chaplin (in silhouette form), The Beatles, Queen Elizabeth II, Ronald Reagan, the Munsters, Jed and Granny Clampett, and cartoon stars Popeye the Sailor, Charlie Brown, Tom Cat, Jerry Mouse and Yogi Bear.

== Cast ==
- Jack Benny . . . Himself
- George Burns . . . Himself
- Phyllis Diller . . . Herself
- George Jessel . . . Himself
- Jack E. Leonard . . . Himself
- Groucho Marx . . . Napoleon/Himself
- The Smothers Brothers . . . Themselves
- Flip Wilson . . . Himself
- Henny Youngman . . . Himself
- Paul Frees . . . Chico Marx, Zeppo Marx, W. C. Fields, Traffic Cop, additional voices
- Joan Gardner . . . Josephine Bonaparte, additional voices

== Crew ==
- Producers/Directors . . . Arthur Rankin, Jr., Jules Bass
- Special Material . . . Romeo Muller
- Flip Wilson Segment Courtesy . . . Atlantic Records
- Caricatures . . . Bruce Stark
- Continuity Design . . . Don Duga
- Animation Production . . . Mushi Productions
- Animation Supervisor . . . Steve Nakagawa
- Animation . . . Osamu Dezaki, Sadao Miyamoto, Akio Sugino (all uncredited)
- Editorial Supervision . . . Irwin Goldress
- Title Song . . . Maury Laws, Jules Bass
- Music . . . Maury Laws
