= List of 1932 box office number-one films in the United States =

This is a list of films which placed number one at the box office in the United States during 1932.

== Number-one films ==
Month	Title	Ref
January	Emma	
February	Hell Divers	
March	One Hour with You	
April	Tarzan the Ape Man	
May	Grand Hotel	
June	As You Desire Me	
July	Bring 'Em Back Alive; Rebecca of Sunnybrook Farm	
August	Horse Feathers	
September	Grand Hotel	
October	Smilin' Through	
November	Red Dust	
December	Prosperity	

== Weekly high-grossers ==
Date (Note: The dates reported by Variety in this table refer to the Saturday near the start of the period that the grosses are reported for. Motion Picture Herald report similar grosses by theater for the week ending the following Saturday. For example, the grosses reported by Variety for January 2, 1932 often match the grosses reported by Motion Picture Herald for the week ending January 9, 1932.)	Title	Gross	Other high grossing films	Ref
January 2	Ladies of the Big House	$348,300	Mata Hari $291,600; Delicious $254,100; Strictly Dishonorable $210,700	
January 9	Mata Hari	$211,700	This Reckless Age $136,300; Emma $133,700; Dr. Jekyll and Mr. Hyde $104,000	
January 16	Dance Team	$278,700	Two Kinds of Women (1932 film) $244,100; Mata Hari $145,900; Hell Divers $133,700	
January 23	Union Depot	$167,000	Emma $146,900; No One Man $127,100; Charlie Chan's Chance $102,000	
January 30	High Pressure	$135,971	Tomorrow and Tomorrow $127,500; No One Man $116,500; Hell Divers $115,628; Mata Hari $111,500; Lovers Courageous $108,700	
February 6	Tomorrow and Tomorrow	$183,000	Hell Divers $133,000; Prestige $96,800; The Silent Witness $90,600	
February 13	Wayward	$130,000	Arrowsmith $120,900; Business and Pleasure $97,100; Murders in the Rue Morgue $95,800	
February 20	Lady with a Past	$158,800	Shanghai Express $134,200; She Wanted a Millionaire $118,900; Fireman, Save My Child $97,200	
February 27	Broken Lullaby	$213,900	Shanghai Express $109,600; Fireman, Save My Child $99,000	
March 5	Strangers in Love	$189,400	Arsène Lupin $127,000	
March 12	Arsène Lupin	$168,500	The Lost Squadron $146,800; Dancers in the Dark $138,030; The Beast of the City $113,600	
March 19	Dancers in the Dark	$151,700	Polly of the Circus $108,300; Hotel Continental $100,900	
March 26	Alias the Doctor	$240,200	One Hour with You $202,200; Tarzan the Ape Man $189,200	
April 2	Tarzan the Ape Man	$193,500	One Hour with You $190,300; Shopworn $137,300	
April 9	Tarzan the Ape Man	$120,600	The Misleading Lady $97,300	
April 16	This Is the Night	$129,400	Tarzan $125,500	
April 23	The Miracle Man	$100,000	The Misleading Lady $84,400; Sky Bride $78,900; The Wet Parade $78,000	
April 30	TBD			
May 7	Letty Lynton	$194,500	The World and the Flesh $170,000	
May 14	Letty Lynton	$140,300	Sinners in the Sun $123,500; The Rich Are Always with Us $103,200; State's Attorney $102,000	
May 21	The Rich Are Always with Us	$107,200	Letty Lynton $98,900	
May 28	Huddle	$139,600	As You Desire Me $128,400	
June 4	As You Desire Me	$229,100	Strangers of the Evening $71,400; Man About Town $62,500; The Strange Love of Molly Louvain $61,800; Society Girl $61,600	
June 11	Merrily We Go to Hell	$293,400	Society Girl $108,500; As You Desire Me $89,700	
June 18	Thunder Below	$242,700	Week Ends Only $105,800; Merrily We Go to Hell $80,000	
June 25	The Man from Yesterday	$174,100	Red-Headed Woman $102,300; Bring 'Em Back Alive $80,000; Bachelor's Affairs $77,000	
July 2	Make Me a Star	$215,050	Red-Headed Woman $107,600; Rebecca of Sunnybrook Farm $100,400; Bring 'Em Back Alive $97,500	
July 9	Red-Headed Woman	$187,800	Million Dollar Legs $107,900	
July 16	Lady and Gent	$147,100	Unashamed $88,500; The Washington Masquerade $79,100	
July 23	Madame Racketeer	$130,200	The Washington Masquerade $92,200	
July 30	TBD			
August 6	The First Year	$246,300	The Washington Masquerade $104,100	
August 13	Guilty as Hell	$200,600	Skyscraper Souls $109,900; The First Year $107,100	
August 20	American Madness	$95,400	Devil and the Deep $93,400; Guilty as Hell $74,800; Skyscraper Souls $71,000;	
August 27	Horse Feathers	$184,700	Speak Easily $91,400; Blondie of the Follies $71,600	
September 3	Back Street	$101,000	The Night Club Lady $100,700; Bird of Paradise $83,000	
September 10	Down to Earth	$170,300	70,000 Witnesses $160,400; Blondie of the Follies $155,700; Love Me Tonight $133,900	
September 17	Blondie of the Follies	$113,500	Bird of Paradise $83,200; 70,000 Witnesses $75,800	
September 24	Grand Hotel	$209,800	The Night of June 13 $194,100	
October 1	Blonde Venus	$213,900	Grand Hotel $195,800	
October 8	The Phantom President	$157,500	Pack Up Your Troubles $114,600; Blonde Venus $86,600	
October 15	The Phantom President	$172,200	Smilin' Through $107,800	
October 22	Smilin' Through	$183,700	The Phantom of Crestwood $149,400; The Big Broadcast $129,600	
October 29	Six Hours to Live	$144,700	Smilin' Through $117,500; Big Broadcast $104,400	
November 5	Red Dust	$140,000	Night After Night $105,900	
November 12	Red Dust	$257,000	Hot Saturday $96,100	
November 19	I Am a Fugitive from a Chain Gang	$188,700	Evenings for Sale $88,500; Sherlock Holmes $84,200; Air Mail $82,900	
November 26	Prosperity	$166,900	The Conquerors $120,700; Tess of the Storm Country $89,700	
December 3	Prosperity	$163,100	Call Her Savage; $126,250; If I Had a Million $103,200; Tess of the Storm Country $101,100	
December 10	Under-Cover Man	$75,700	Evenings for Sale $74,500	
December 17	Flesh	$150,900		
December 24	TBD			

== The Box Office Champions of 1932 ==
Title	Distributor
Grand Hotel	MGM
Emma	MGM
Dr. Jekyll and Mr. Hyde	Paramount
Mata Hari	MGM
Delicious	Fox Film
The Man Who Played God	Warner Bros.
Hell Divers	MGM
One Hour with You	Paramount
Shanghai Express	Paramount
Arrowsmith	United Artists
Shopworn	Columbia
Business and Pleasure	Fox Film
Tarzan the Ape Man	MGM
Bring 'Em Back Alive	RKO
Frankenstein	Universal

== See also ==
- Lists of American films — American films by year
- Lists of box office number-one films

== Chronology ==
1932	Succeeded by 1933
