= List of 1934 box office number-one films in the United States =

This is a list of films which placed number one at the box office in the United States during 1934.

== Number-one films ==
Month	Title	Ref
January	Dinner at Eight	
February	Carolina	
March	It Happened One Night	
April	Riptide	
May	The House of Rothschild	
June	Many Happy Returns	
July	TBD	
August	Treasure Island	
September	Belle of the Nineties	
October	The Barretts of Wimpole Street; Judge Priest	
November	The Merry Widow	
December	Flirtation Walk	

== Box Office Champions of 1934 ==
This is a list of the box office champions of 1934 in the United States for the calendar year.

Rank	Title	Distributor
1	The House of Rothschild	United Artists
2	It Happened One Night	Columbia
3	Wonder Bar	First National
4	Roman Scandals	United Artists
5	One Night of Love	Columbia
6	The Gay Divorcee	RKO
7	Dinner at Eight	MGM
8	Belle of the Nineties	Paramount
9	Riptide	MGM
10	Little Women	RKO

== Chronology ==
Preceded by 1933	1934	Succeeded by 1935
