= List of 1937 box office number-one films in the United States =

This is a list of films which placed number one at the box office in the United States during 1937.

== Number-one films ==
Month	Title	Ref
January	After the Thin Man	
February	On the Avenue	
March	Maytime	
April	Maytime	
May	Shall We Dance	
June	I Met Him in Paris	
July	Wee Willie Winkie	
August	You Can't Have Everything	
September	Thin Ice	
October	Life Begins in College	
November	The Awful Truth	
December	The Firefly	

== See also ==
- Lists of American films — American films by year
- Lists of box office number-one films

== Chronology ==
Preceded by 1936	1937	Succeeded by 1938
