= Will B. Johnstone =

American cartoonist

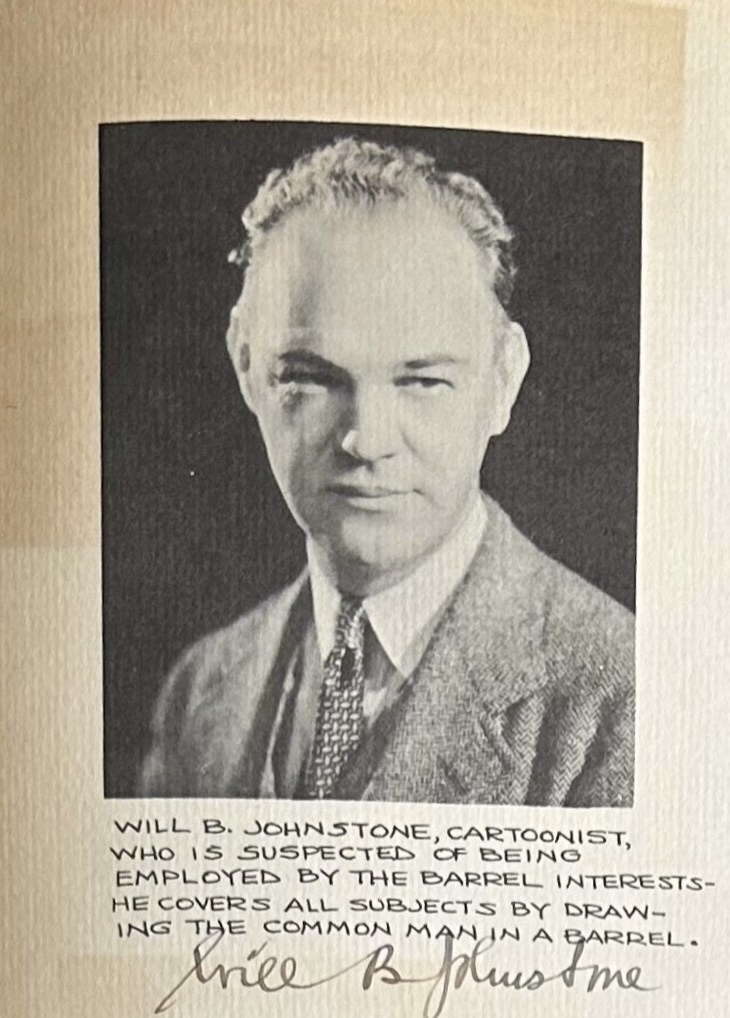
- Born: William Breuninger Johnstone; March 13, 1881; St. Louis, Missouri, US
- Died: February 4, 1944 (aged 62); West Palm Beach, Florida, U.S.
- Occupations: Cartoonist; Lyricist; Librettist; Scenarist

William Breuninger Johnstone (13 March 1881 – 4 February 1944) was an American writer, cartoonist, and lyricist.

His writing credits include the Marx Brothers's Broadway revue I'll Say She Is and, with S.J. Perelman, their first two Hollywood films, Monkey Business and Horse Feathers. He also wrote several popular songs, including a version of "How Dry I Am", a part of which plagiarizes Rudyard Kipling's "Mandalay."

He created the cartoon character of 'The Tax Payer' wearing only a barrel held up by suspenders. It was a regular feature in the New York World-Telegram. Johnstone also created the comic strip You Know Me Al (distributed by the Bell Syndicate).
