= List of 1936 box office number-one films in the United States =

This is a list of films which placed number one at the box office in the United States during 1936.

== Number-one films ==
Month	Title	Ref
January	Captain Blood	
February	Rose Marie	
March	Follow the Fleet	
April	Mr. Deeds Goes to Town	
May	Under Two Flags	
June	Bullets or Ballots	
July	San Francisco	
August	His Brother's Wife	
September	Swing Time	
October	The Big Broadcast of 1937	
November	Libeled Lady	
December	Born to Dance	

== See also ==
- Lists of American films — American films by year
- Lists of box office number-one films

== Chronology ==
Preceded by 1935	1936	Succeeded by 1937
