= List of 1935 box office number-one films in the United States =

This is a list of films which placed number one at the box office in the United States during 1935.

== Number-one films ==
Month	Title	Gross	Ref
January	Forsaking All Others	$396,900	
February	David Copperfield	$548,870	
March	Roberta	$582,325	
April	Roberta	$210,350	
May	G Men	$487,288	
June	No More Ladies	$249,600	
July	Love Me Forever	$547,849	
August	Curly Top	$391,590	
September	Top Hat	$907,650	
October	Broadway Melody of 1936	$332,850	
November	Mutiny on the Bounty	$597,650	
December	Mutiny on the Bounty	$306,800	

== Chronology ==
Preceded by 1934	1935	Succeeded by 1936
