= List of 1933 box office number-one films in the United States =

This is a list of films which placed number one at the box office in the United States during 1933.

== Number-one films ==
Month	Title	Ref
January	Strange Interlude	
February	Cavalcade	
March	42nd Street	
April	King Kong	
May	The Working Man	
June	Gold Diggers of 1933	
July	Gold Diggers of 1933	
August	Tugboat Annie	
September	Tugboat Annie	
October	The Bowery	
November	I'm No Angel	
December	Little Women	

== Box Office Champions of 1933 ==
This is a list of the box office champions of 1933 based on 157 key theatres in the United States.

Rank	Title	Distributor
1	I'm No Angel	Paramount
2	Cavalcade	Fox Film
2	Gold Diggers of 1933	Warner Bros.
3	Little Women	RKO
3	42nd Street	Warner Bros.
4	Be Mine Tonight	Universal
4	Tugboat Annie	MGM
5	State Fair	Fox Film
5	Mädchen in Uniform	John Krimsky and Gifford A. Cochran
6	Rasputin and the Empress	MGM
7	The Animal Kingdom	RKO
7	The Kid from Spain	United Artists
7	The Private Life of Henry VIII	United Artists

== See also ==
- Lists of American films — American films by year
- Lists of box office number-one films

== Chronology ==
Preceded by 1932	1933	Succeeded by 1934
