= I'll Say She Is =

- Original Broadway windowcard
- Music: Tom Johnstone
- Lyrics: Will B. Johnstone
- Book: Will B. Johnstone
- Productions: 1924 Broadway 2014 New York International Fringe Festival 2016 Off-Broadway

I'll Say She Is (1924) is a musical comedy revue written by brothers Will B. Johnstone (book and lyrics) and Tom Johnstone (music). It was the Broadway debut of the Marx Brothers (Groucho, Harpo, Chico, and Zeppo). The initial production premiered in June 1923 at Walnut Street Theatre in Philadelphia, Pennsylvania before its national tour.

== Background ==
I'll Say She Is led to the Marxes' rise out of vaudeville and into stardom on the Broadway stage and later into motion pictures. It came at a time when they had gotten themselves effectively banned from the major vaudeville circuits owing to a dispute with E. F. Albee, and had failed in an attempt to produce their own shows on the alternate Shubert circuit.

The show included some Marx Brothers routines and musical specialties from their years in vaudeville, incorporated into a thin narrative about a rich girl looking for thrills, as presented to her by a succession of male suitors. The libretto and lyrics were written by Will B. Johnstone, who later co-wrote the classic Marx Brothers films Monkey Business (1931) and Horse Feathers (1932) with music by his brother, Tom Johnstone. The comedic high point was a long sketch featuring Groucho as Napoleon, which the Brothers regarded as the funniest thing they ever did. After touring for almost a year, the show opened on Broadway on May 19, 1924 at the Casino Theatre. It closed on February 7, 1925 after 313 performances.

The show was a roaring success, and it catapulted the Marx Brothers to superstardom, accepted by the New York smart set of the Algonquin Round Table. Alexander Woollcott and Robert Benchley were among the theatre critics who made I'll Say She Is a smash, and George S. Kaufman would co-write their next two Broadway musicals, The Cocoanuts (1925) and Animal Crackers (1928). Unlike those shows, however, I'll Say She Is was never made into a film. A version of its opening scene, however, was made into a short for Paramount Pictures as part of a feature called The House That Shadows Built (1931), made to celebrate Paramount's 20th anniversary of their founding in 1912, and as a promotion for the then-upcoming Marx film Monkey Business. An animated version of the Napoleon scene (with Groucho voicing himself) was incorporated into an ABC-TV special called The Mad, Mad, Mad Comedians (1970).

== Synopsis ==
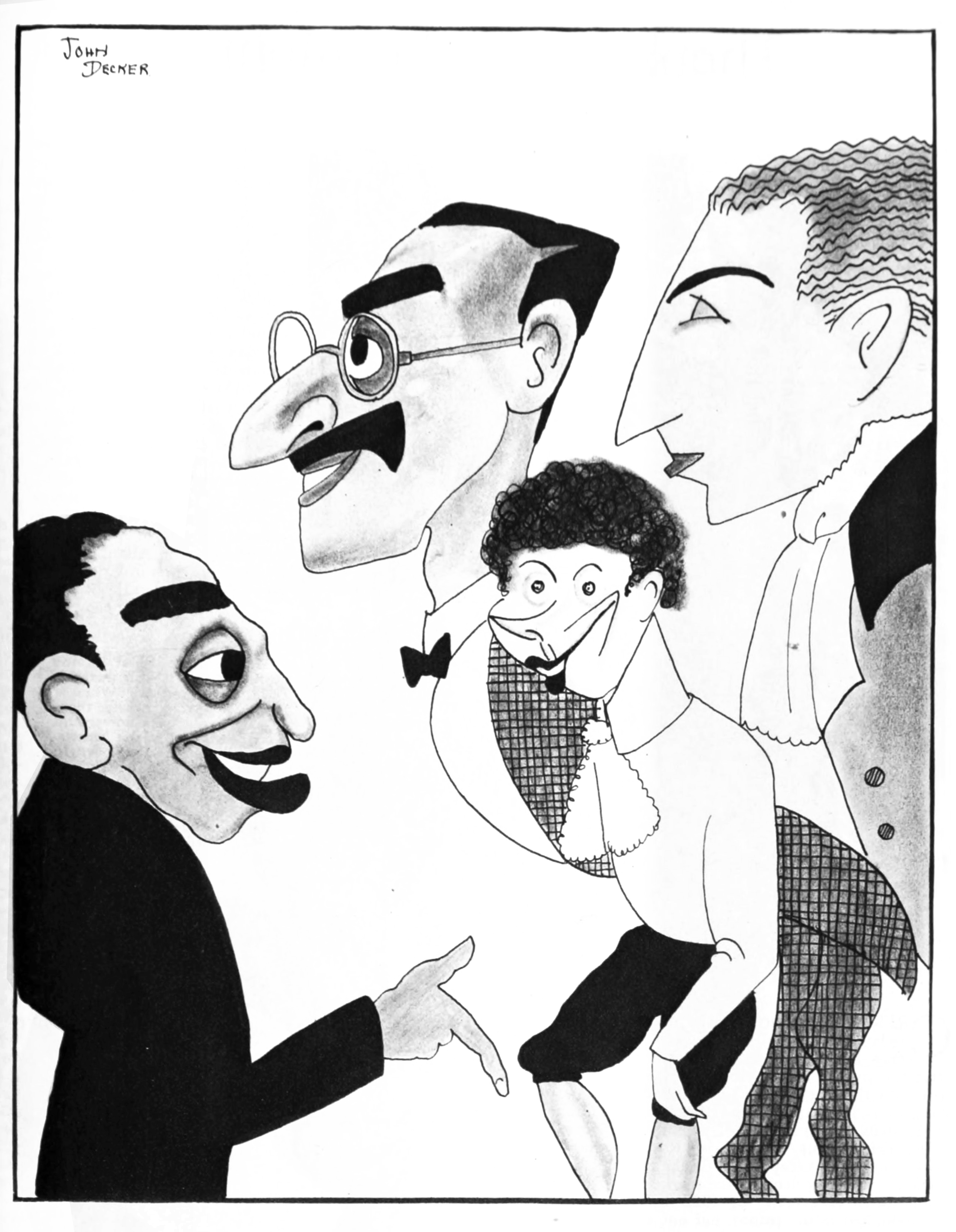
Caricature by John Decker of the Marx Brothers in the show. Original caption: “THOSE FOUR FUNNY FELLOWS IN ‘I’LL SAY SHE IS!’ The four Marx Brothers who have conquered New York without a single casualty. Left to right they are Chico, Groucho, Beppo [sic], Harpo, Leonard, Julius, Herbert and Arthur respectively”

=== Act I ===
Scene 1 – Theatrical Agency.

The first act begins with a song by the chorus called "Do It".

At its conclusion, the setting changes to the office of a talent agent, wherein Zeppo bursts through the door, proclaiming to be a great musical actor. He gives a terrible impression of a popular musical act of the day. (The act being imitated would change over the run of the show. Gallagher and Shean, Joe Frisco, and Charlie Chaplin are a few of its victims.)

Just as the agent is about to kick Zeppo out, Chico arrives, also proclaiming to be a great musical talent, and gives an even worse impression of the same musical act. This is followed by Groucho, who wisecracks his way through his unsolicited audition. Finally, Harpo bursts in, who pantomimes his way through his take on the audition.

Another actor arrives, asking for a juvenile part, but he cannot do the impression the Brothers have just butchered. The agent invites him in. He then confides in the would-be actors that he has no jobs for them, but that there's "a wealthy young lady who claims she will give her heart, her hand, and her fortune to the man who gives her the greatest thrill."

He then asks if they recall "the old fable of the Richman, Poorman, Beggarman, Thief, Doctor, Lawyer, Merchant, Chief." The agent assigns himself as The Richman, and the rest of the cast will take the other parts, with each pursuing the wealthy young lady under the guise of the assigned role. This meager plot device ties the musical revue together.

Scene 2 – Art Curtain.

The men arrive at the heiress's residence, much to the chagrin of the butler, who agrees to let them in.

Scene 3 – Beauty's Reception Room.

The eight gentleman suitors, among them The Four Marx Brothers, enter the reception room of the heiress (known throughout as "The Beauty"). The men, each playing the roles of the aforementioned fable, attempt to woo her, but she states she needs a thrill in life. The Beauty requests that they each draw a number, to decide who gets the first chance to give her that thrill. In so doing, she takes the hand of The Chief, but doesn't let go. The Beauty and The Chief then sing the duet, "Thrill of Love" or "Only You". (The two songs were transposed between Acts I and II at some point during the run of the show.)

Scene 4 – Art Curtain.

From the drawing of numbers, The Richman draws the number one. But The Thief, being a thief, steals The Beauty and takes her to Chinatown.

Scene 5 – Chinatown Street.

In Chinatown, The Thief shows The Beauty all sorts of insidious thrills: terror, gunshots, and murder.

Scene 6 – The Opium Den.

The Thief then takes The Beauty to an opium den. The Beauty says that she'll "try anything once," and smokes opium. She falls asleep, which is followed by a "Chinese Apache Dance" number. At the end of the dance, one of the dancers falls dead.

Scene 7 – The Dream Ship.

An actor playing the role of a "Chinaman" sings "San Toy" and carries the dead dancer offstage. This is followed by a "dream ship" dance sequence. The Beauty awakes, with the Thief re-entering the scene, along with Groucho and a policeman. Groucho tells the policeman to arrest The Beauty, due to the death that has taken place.

Groucho: You are going to be convicted of murder.

Beauty: What makes you so confident?

Groucho: I'm going to be your lawyer.

Scene 8 – The Court Room.

The Beauty enters the courtroom, accused of murder. Harpo enters as the judge. Chico enters as the defense lawyer, but is mainly interested in playing cards with Harpo.

Groucho enters as the district attorney, to try to convict The Beauty of murder. He accuses her of stabbing the "Chinaman" with a revolver, but she proclaims innocence, and counterattacks by telling the Brothers that after they left her reception room earlier, all her silverware had gone missing.

A Detective then enters to inquire about three suits that were stolen from the judge's chambers. He quickly finds a plethora of stolen property on both Groucho and Chico. He then shakes Harpo's hand, wondering why an honest man keeps such bad company. While shaking his hand, the silverware stolen from The Beauty falls out of Harpo's coat, piece by piece.

Scene 9 – Art Curtain.

The Beauty and The Chief appear before the curtain and make plans to meet later, after The Beauty has sought out more thrills.

Scene 10 – 'Rainy Day'.

Chorus members sing "Rainy Day".

Scene 11 – Art Curtain.

Another song follows: a solo for one of the female chorus members called "Wall Street Blues".

Scene 12 – Wall Street.

The Beauty meets the Richman on Wall Street. The Beauty watches as The Richman invests in stock, and, also, takes a turn at gambling. Thinking that this may be the thrill she's seeking, The Beauty tries her hand at gambling as well, and eventually, The Richman tells her the biggest gamblers play the stock market.

Scene 13 – Wall Street Plaything.

At the conclusion of the Wall Street sequence, which ends the first act, an elaborate costumed ballet performs a dance interpretation of gambling. Photographs from the performance show dancers dressed as dice, coins, a roulette wheel, and a gold statue, not unlike the extravagant Busby Berkeley dance numbers seen in 1930s film.

=== Act II ===
Scene 1 – Art Curtain.

The second act opens with an unknown song by The Melvin Sisters.

Scene 2 – The Inception of Drapery.

Zeppo takes his turn to woo The Beauty. He does so by giving her the thrill of clothing and jewels from foreign lands, each carried onstage by a chorus girl, with The Beauty trying on a plethora of the risque garments. This does nothing to thrill The Beauty, and Zeppo walks off, telling her:

Zeppo: It's the Beggarman's chance now. He will give you the thrill of Cinderella backwards. He will take you from riches to poverty. Good-Night!

Scene 3 – Cinderella Backwards.

Groucho, dressed in a tutu and long underwear and smoking a pipe, enters from behind the curtain—an intentionally bad Fairy Godmother impersonation. The Beauty tells Groucho that she wants to experience the thrill of being poor, having been rich all her life. She then asks for him to take her to her Prince Charming, but Groucho refuses, since he has other Cinderellas he has to look after. He promises to be back at midnight, so The Beauty decides to call her Rolls-Royce. Groucho tells her no, if she wants to experience being poor, she'll have to walk.

Groucho: No Rolls-Royce, no taxi, no street car, no roller skates, not even a Chevrolet, you'll walk!

Beauty: Marvellous, it's the first time in all my life I've ever walked!

Groucho: Ah, then you have never been automobile riding?

Scene 4 – Hawaiian Scene.

In early performances, a dance quartet performed a "marathon dance number" at this point in the revue. On Broadway, this was replaced by a Hawaiian dance featuring "Sixteen Yankee Girls".

Scene 5 – Art Curtain.

The Chief and The Beauty meet at a marble fountain, with The Beauty wondering if The Chief is still pursuing her. They then sing "Thrill of Love" or "Only You". (The two songs were transposed between Acts I and II at some point during the run of the show.)

Scene 6 – The Marble Fountain.

A ballet of dancers portraying living statues performs a sequence called "The Awakening of Love". Groucho, Harpo, and Zeppo then parody this dance with their own dance number, referred to as "The Death of Love".

Scene 7 – The Hypnotist.

Chico claims to be a hypnotist, telling The Richman that he has just hypnotized The Beauty and she now thinks she is Josephine, wife of Napoleon. He then attempts to hypnotize The Richman himself with mixed results.

Chico: ...You are a cat.

Richman: Meow!

Chico: You are a dog!

Richman: Meow, - - - Woof! Woof!

Chico: You are a snake.

Richman: How do you "snake"?

Chico: Just like a worm, only more.
(Richman tries to wriggle like a snake)
...What a fat snake.

Richman: Yes, but I don't think I am a snake.

Chico: You don't, but I will give a thousand dollars to anyone who can prove that I don't think you are a snake.

Scene 8 – Napoleon's First Waterloo.

The Beauty enters as Josephine followed by Groucho as Napoleon. He calls for his faithful advisors—Francois, Alphonse, and Gaston—played by Chico, Zeppo, and Harpo, respectively. They appear, and they can barely hide their infatuation with The Beauty. Harpo makes no attempt to do so, ignoring Groucho's introduction altogether.

Groucho questions The Beauty's love for him, but she doesn't understand. He leaves several times to go off to war, always coming back to say goodbye once more, or to fetch the sword he keeps forgetting. Each time he leaves, the other Brothers attempt to violently woo The Beauty, with Groucho alternately suspicious and oblivious to his advisors' advances to his wife. This becomes increasingly difficult for The Beauty to hide, as Harpo leaves his harp behind, and Chico, under cover, begins to sneeze. Eventually, Groucho discovers what is going on. The Beauty is afraid that Groucho will kill her, but he says he won't. Instead, he is going to sell the couch, which The Beauty finds even more upsetting than killing her.

Scene 9 – Finale.

The revue closes with another song and dance number, which changed over the life of the show. During its Broadway run, the song performed was called "A Bit of Tango Jazz".

The eight gentleman suitors then enter with The Beauty. The Beauty tells them that the contest is over. She has found the greatest thrill in life, and that thrill is love. And she has found the thrill of love with The Chief.

== Characters and original cast ==
- Adolph Arthur Marx (Harpo) as The Beggarman
- Herbert Marx (Zeppo) as The Doctor
- Julius Henry Marx (Groucho) as The Lawyer
- Leonard Marx (Chico) as The Poorman
- Lotta Miles as The Beauty
- Edward Metcalfe as The Richman
- Frank J. Corbett as The Chief
- Philip Darby as The Merchant
- Edgar Gardiner as The Thief
- Ledru Stiffler as Gold Man
- Harry Walters as Hop Merchant
- Cecile D'Andrea as White Girl
- Alice Webb as Nanette
- Hazel Gaudreau as Hazel
- Marcella Hardie as Marcella
- Martha Pryor as Martha
- Bunny Parker as Office Girl
- Crissie Melvin as Office Girl
- Evelyn Shea as Pierrot
- Jane Hurd as Pierrot
- Roger Pryor Dodge as Chinaman
- Ruth Urban as Chinese Boy
- Florence Arledge as Chinese Boy
- Mildred Joy as Street Gamins
- Gertrude Cole as Street Gamins
- The Bower Sisters as Street Gamins
- The Melvin Sisters as Pages

== Performances and aftermath ==
The show debuted for previews at Walnut Street Theatre in Philadelphia on June 4, 1923 and was a critical success. It opened at the Casino Theatre in New York City on May 19, 1924. Legend has it that the first-string critics for the New York papers were slated to see a different show premiering at the Winter Garden Theatre the same night, and only came to I'll Say She Is when the other show was postponed at the last moment. However, as both the Winter Garden and the Casino were part of the Shubert chain, it seems more likely that the openings were deliberately set for different dates to avoid competing with each other. In any case, the critics, notably Alexander Woollcott, who was only at the show because his other engagements were canceled, raved about the show, especially Harpo's performance, and the Marx Brothers became first-rank stars virtually overnight.

Despite the fact that the Marx Brothers were the stars of this show, because it was a revue, they are absent from significant parts of the performance. They are almost entirely absent from the musical numbers and do not appear at all in several scenes. Because of this, much of the material that they performed in I'll Say She Is exists in one form or another. The opening "Theatrical Agency" scene was later filmed for the Paramount Pictures release The House That Shadows Built almost in its entirety. Instead of Gallagher and Shean or Joe Frisco, they impersonate Maurice Chevalier in the filmed performance.

The penultimate Napoleon scene was filmed as a cartoon in 1970 by Rankin-Bass in their 30-minute television production The Mad, Mad, Mad Comedians. Groucho, 80 years old, reprised the role of Napoleon. Harpo and Chico had both died by then, while Zeppo declined to return, so Chico's part was performed by Paul Frees, Zeppo was reduced to a single line also voiced by Frees, while Harpo's part, having no spoken lines, was replaced by sound effects. Reportedly, Groucho was impressed by the accuracy of Frees's performance as Chico.

The Marx Brothers' last Paramount film, Duck Soup, contains a courtroom scene largely inspired by the one in I'll Say She Is, although there are significant differences. The silverware gag in this scene was recycled for the stage performance of Animal Crackers and is also featured in the film of the same name.

This is also the last production by The Marx Brothers in which they were billed under their given names. Harpo was billed as Adolph Arthur, Zeppo as Herbert, Groucho as Julius Henry, and Chico as Leonard. In his autobiography Harpo Speaks (1961), Harpo wrote that theatre critic Alexander Woollcott encouraged the Brothers to use their stage names in any subsequent production, which they did, starting with their next Broadway show, The Cocoanuts (1925), which was later turned into a film version in 1929.

Having toiled on the Vaudeville circuit for nearly a quarter century, this would be the last stage performance that The Marx Brothers would perform for Vaudeville theaters. Once I'll Say She Is hit Broadway, they never left. They would have two further Broadway hits, The Cocoanuts and Animal Crackers, which were then filmed in the early years of talking pictures as their first two feature films. With the closing of Animal Crackers, their third and final Broadway show, the Marx Brothers moved to Hollywood, and enjoyed long careers in film and television.

== Adaptation and 2016 Off-Broadway Revival ==
In 2009, writer and performer Noah Diamond began to research and restore I'll Say She Is, working from Johnstone's 30-page rehearsal typescript and numerous other sources to reconstruct the show. In May 2014, coinciding with the ninetieth anniversary of the show's Broadway opening, I'll Say She Is received two staged readings, in a new "reconstruction" and adaptation by Diamond, who had by then spent five years researching and expanding the work. A fuller staging was seen in August 2014 at the New York International Fringe Festival, featuring Melody Jane as Beauty, Noah Diamond as Groucho, Seth Shelden as Harpo, Robert Pinnock as Chico, Aristotle Stamat as Zeppo, and Kathy Biehl as Ruby. Both the Marxfest readings and the Fringe productions were co-produced and directed by Trav S.D.

A full Off Broadway production opened at the Connelly Theater in June 2016, running for 3 previews and 23 performances. Directed by Amanda Sisk, it was well received by the New York press, receiving critic's pick from The New York Times and lauded by Adam Gopnik in The New Yorker. Diamond and Shelden reprised their roles as Groucho and Harpo respectively, the British comedian Matt Roper played Chico, actor Matt Walters portrayed Zeppo, while Sabrina Chap arranged the score and worked as musical director and bandleader. A short film featuring interviews and cast rehearsals was featured in the Wall Street Journal.

Having observed a rehearsal session of the famed 'Napoleon' sketch at New York's Pearl Studios, Gopnik wrote in the New Yorker:

"One sees at once why the Napoleon scene became legendary overnight—apart from still being extremely funny, it has the edge of randomness, the pure absurdity, that made the Marx Brothers seem, on that opening night as ever after, so modern. Of the great movie comedians, Chaplin is rooted in Dickens and the nineteenth-century stage; Keaton, more cinematic, in a kind of melancholic Civil War stoicism. Only the Marxes seem contemporary with Dada. There is no logic or pathos or point or even much structure to it—the fourth wall is broken, then restored, and then broken again. Napoleon’s appearances and reappearances from the Russian front are as arbitrary as a Magritte drawing—and the scene’s moral, to the degree that it has one, is the nihilistic one that runs true in comedy from Aristophanes to Sid Caesar: all authority is always ridiculous, and man (and woman) runs by appetite alone. All of Monty Python’s non sequiturs and sudden stoppages—"the sketch is now over"—begin here, as does most of the pure burlesque aggression of a Mel Brooks, whose historical kidding, as in the “2000 Year Old Man” skits, starts here, too."

A book Gimme a Thrill: The Story of I'll Say She Is, the Lost Marx Brothers Musical, and How it Was Found was published by BearManor Media in 2016.
