= Chico Marx =

American comedian (1887–1961)

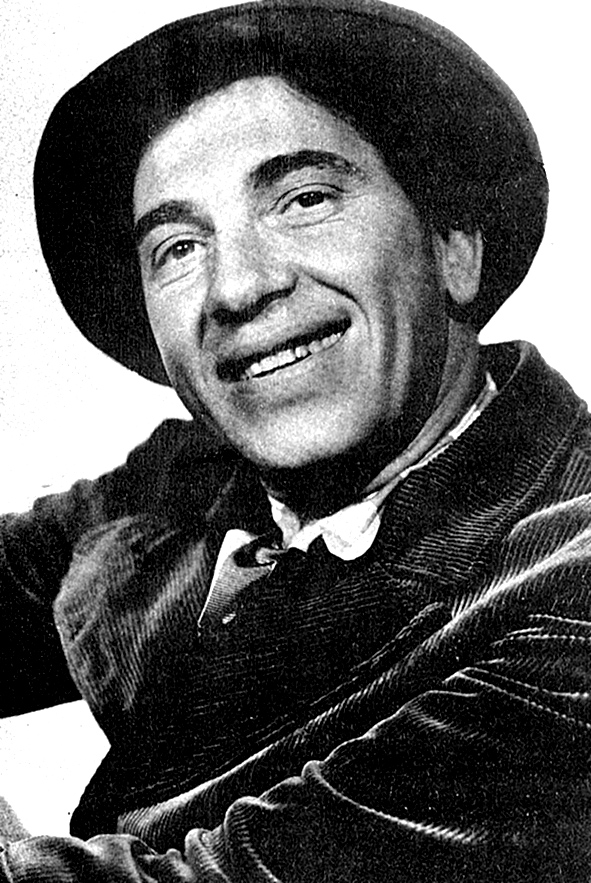
- Chico c. 1930
- Born: Leonard Marx; March 22, 1887; New York City, New York, U.S.
- Died: October 11, 1961 (aged 74); Hollywood, California, U.S.
- Burial place: Forest Lawn Memorial Park Cemetery, Glendale, California, U.S.
- Other name: Leo Marx
- Occupations: Actor; comedian; pianist
- Years active: 1910–1960
- Height: 5 ft 6 in (168 cm)
- Spouses: Betty Karp (m. 1917; div. 1940); Mary De Vithas (m. 1958)
- Children: 1
- Parents: Sam "Frenchie" Marx (father); Minnie Schönberg (mother)
- Relatives: Harpo Marx (brother); Groucho Marx (brother); Gummo Marx (brother); Zeppo Marx (brother); Al Shean (maternal uncle); Arthur Marx (nephew); Miriam Marx (niece); Melinda Marx (niece); Bill Marx (nephew)

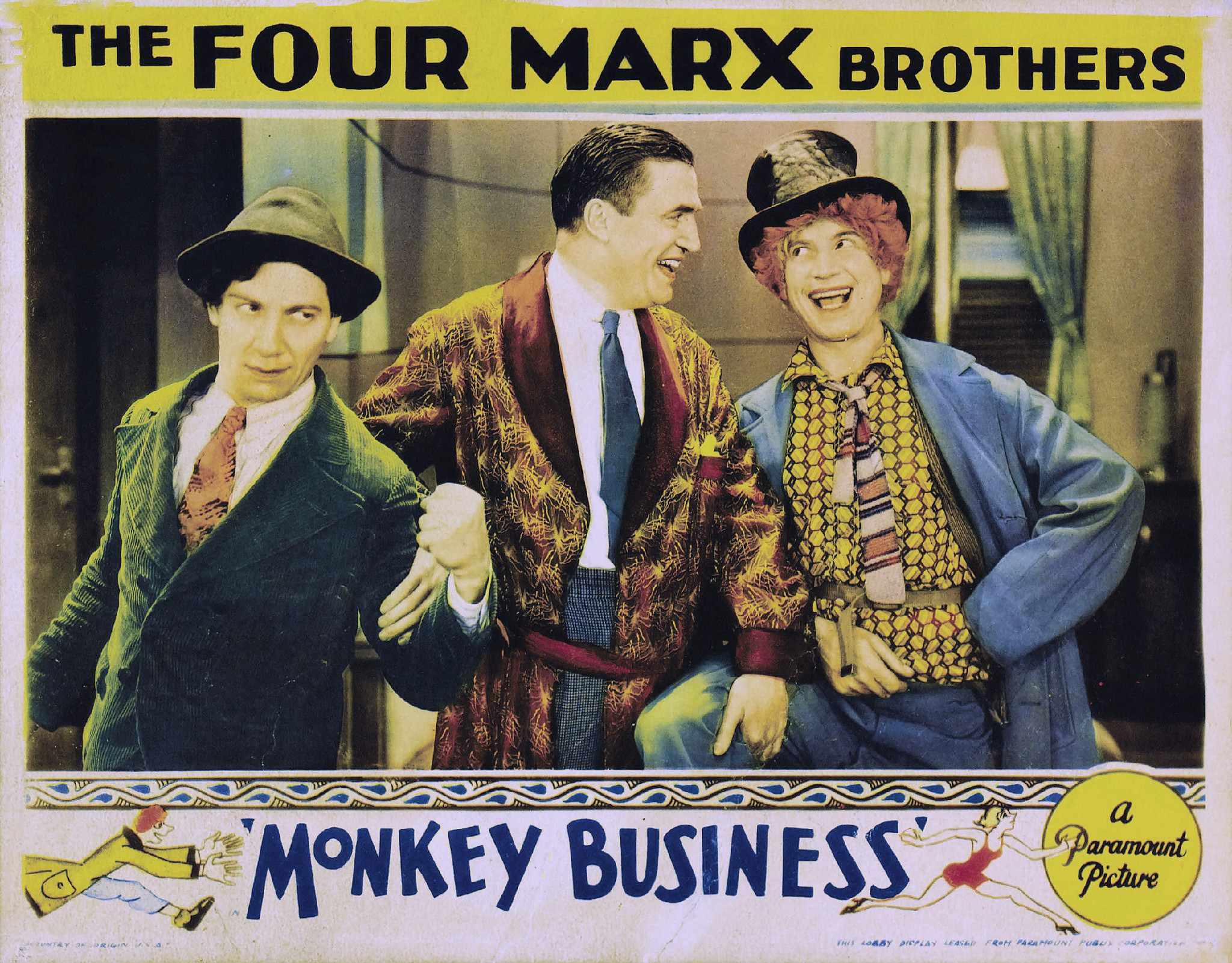
Lobby card for Monkey Business (1931) with Chico (left) and Harpo (right)

Leonard "Chico" Marx (/ˈtʃɪkoʊ/ CHICK-oh; March 22, 1887 – October 11, 1961) was an American comedian, actor, and pianist. He was the oldest brother in the Marx Brothers comedy troupe, alongside his brothers Arthur ("Harpo"), Julius ("Groucho"), Milton ("Gummo"), and Herbert ("Zeppo"). His persona in the act was that of a charming, uneducated but crafty con artist, seemingly of rural Italian origin, who wore shabby clothes and sported a curly-haired wig and Tyrolean hat. On screen, Chico is often in alliance with Harpo, usually as partners in crime, and is also frequently seen trying to con or outfox Groucho.

Leonard was the oldest of the Marx Brothers to live past early childhood, the first-born being Manfred Marx who died in infancy. In addition to his work as a performer, he played an important role in the management and development of the act in its early years.

== Early years ==
Marx was born in Manhattan, New York City, on March 22, 1887. His mother Miene ("Minnie") Marx (née Schoenberg) was from Dornum in East Frisia. Around 1880, the family emigrated to New York City. His father, Samuel ("Sam" or "Frenchy"; born Simon) Marx, was a native of Mertzwiller, a small Alsatian village, and worked as a tailor. Minnie and Sam married on January 18, 1885. Their first child, Manfred, died of tuberculosis; Leonard was their second, and was followed in turn by Arthur, Julius, Milton, and Herbert.

Minnie came from a family of performers. Her mother was a yodeling harpist and her father a ventriloquist; both were funfair entertainers. Her brother was vaudeville comedian Al Shean, best known as one half of Gallagher and Shean. Harboring similar ambitions for Leonard - and in an attempt to keep him out of trouble - she purchased a secondhand upright piano and provided lessons for him.

By the age of nine, Leonard was a gambler, and by the age of eleven, he would stay out all night hustling pool. He lost his first job, in 1899, for playing craps on premises, and, in other jobs, would routinely gamble his money away on payday. In his mid-teens, with pressure from his parents to stop gambling, he left home, supporting himself by playing piano in nickelodeons and whorehouses. He also briefly toured with a circus as a wrestler, and later, a flyweight boxer.

== Career ==
=== 1911-1922: Vaudeville ===
By 1907, Chico was working at music publishing firm Shapiro, Bernstein & Co.. When the founder of that company, Maurice Shapiro, died in 1911, Chico quit immediately, convincing a young tenor, Aaron Gordon, to tour with him in vaudeville. At the time, there was a successful vaudeville act called The Two Funny Germans, starring Bill Gordon and Nick Marx; with Minnie's encouragement, Aaron Gordon and Chico Marx adopted Italian accents (Chico's reputedly based on that of his barber) and toured as Marx and Gordon. Gordon, who later said that he never saw a salary because Chico gambled away their earnings, left the act in the fall of that year.

Chico then briefly paired with his cousin Lou Shean. Marx soon found himself in trouble for picking up a 19 year old Indiana woman who was engaged to be married, and bringing her to Wisconsin with him, where they registered in a hotel as man and wife - a possible violation of the Mann Act. Although Chico escaped prosecution, Shean was frustrated by the experience. When Chico was later caught with a woman who was involved with a local theater manager, the manager fined the act and fired them; Chico tried to claim the fine was a business expense, and Shean quit.

Meanwhile, Chico's brothers Groucho, Harpo, and Gummo were touring in a production they called Fun in High School. Chico, who was touring with a new partner, contacted Minnie to suggest that they turn the act into a tabloid musical. Sources differ on what happened next. One story states that, without telling the other brothers, Minnie arranged for Chico to be at their performance in Waukegan, Illinois. As the act opened, Groucho and Harpo noticed that their brother was in the orchestra pit, playing the piano. Harpo threw an apple at Chico, who caught it and threw it at Groucho. As the brothers continued to throw fruit at each other, the audience yelled and clapped for more. Known dates for their Waukegan shows do not match up with those of Chico joining the act; the first verified appearance of them together was when Chico and his brothers shared a bill in August 1912.

Management of the act gradually transitioned from Minnie, who moved to Chicago and started managing other acts, to Chico. At Chico's instigation, the brothers expanded Fun in High School into a longer musical called Mr. Green's Reception. In addition to an entirely new second act, they incorporated Chico's then-partner George Lee and a dance act called the Harris Brothers. Groucho would later credit their ambition to Chico, saying that "Chico kept telling us we were good... Harpo and I were always scared."

In the spring of 1913, Chico spent time out of the act recovering from an operation. Neither he nor his brothers ever directly discussed the absence. Groucho mentioned later in life that Chico had been shot by the father of one of the women he seduced, and Robert Bader, author of Four of the Three Musketeers, suggests that the time off may have been to recover from a bullet wound.

The act thrived with Chico. In 1914, realizing that they needed better material to attract a larger audience, they enlisted their uncle Al Shean to help them write Home Again, a musical comedy about a group of American tourists returning from a trip to Europe. Home Again proved popular enough that the act started guaranteeing theater owners that they would bring in more than their average weekly receipts. Later that year, they moved from the small chain of Pantages theaters to the larger chain controlled by the United Booking Office.

==== Pronunciation and origin of name ====
It was during Chico's time in vaudeville that he acquired his nickname (during a card game). During Groucho's live performance at Carnegie Hall in 1972, he states that his brother got the name Chico because he was a "chicken-chaser" (early 20th century slang for womanizer). Chico's nickname was originally spelled Chicko. A typesetter accidentally omitted the 'k', so his name became Chico.

While the Marxes typically pronounced Chico as Chick-oh, others sometimes mistakenly pronounced it Cheek-oh. Numerous radio recordings from the 1940s exist in which announcers and fellow actors mispronounce the nickname, but Chico does not correct them. As late as the 1950s, Groucho used the wrong pronunciation for comedic effect. A guest on You Bet Your Life told the quizmaster she grew up around Chico, California, which is pronounced Cheek-oh. Groucho responded, "I grew up around Chico myself. You aren't Gummo, are you?" In most interviews, Groucho is heard correctly pronouncing it "Chicko", as in an episode of The Dick Cavett Show with Groucho talking to Dan Rowan.

=== 1929-1949: Films and touring ===
When they later made films, as manager, Chico negotiated with the studios to get the brothers a percentage of a film's gross receipts—the first deal of its kind in Hollywood which has become common practice today. Furthermore, it was Chico's connection with Irving Thalberg, head of production at Metro-Goldwyn-Mayer, that led to Thalberg's signing the Brothers when they were in a career slump after Duck Soup (1933), the last of their films for Paramount.

For a while in the 1930s and 1940s, Chico led a big band. Crooner Mel Tormé began his professional career singing with the Chico Marx Orchestra.

Chico's chronic gambling addiction compelled him to continue working in show business long after his brothers had retired in comfort from their Hollywood income, and in the early 1940s, he found himself playing in the same small, cheap theater halls in which he had begun his career 30 years earlier. The Marx Brothers' film, A Night in Casablanca (1946), was produced after the team had officially retired and was made largely for Chico's financial benefit. Chico had filed for bankruptcy a few years prior. At around this time, the rest of the Marx brothers, finally aware of Chico's out-of-control gambling, took full control over his finances; they took all money away from Chico as he earned it and put him on an allowance to curb his constant betting and gambling. Chico stayed on the allowance until his death.

=== 1950s: Television ===
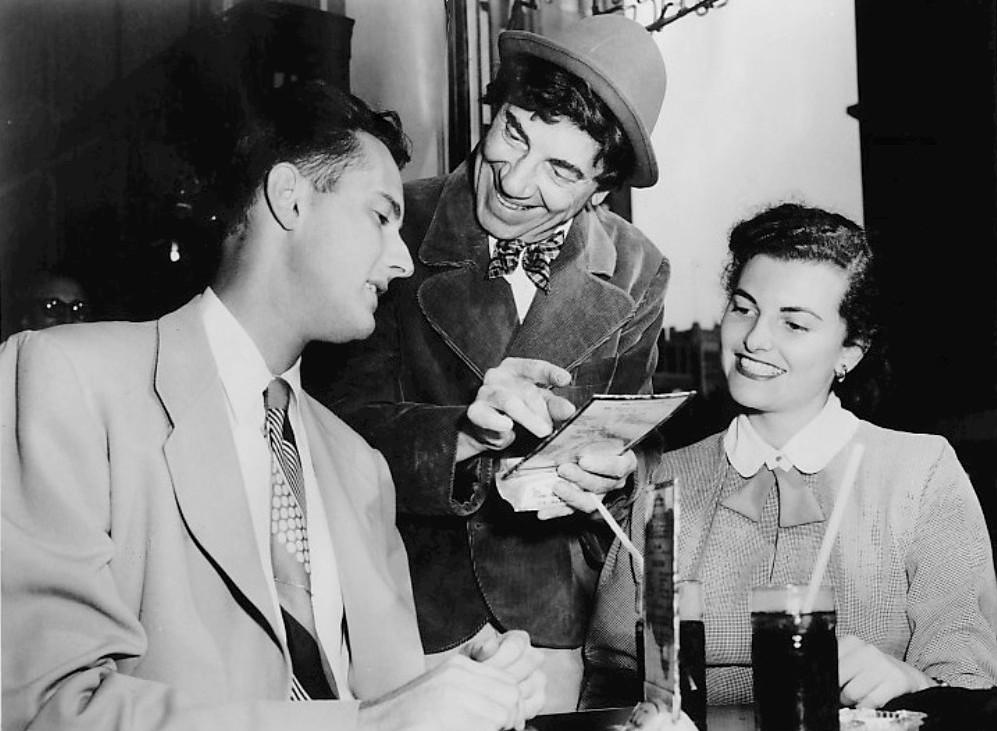
Chico starred in ABC's 1950 comedy-variety series The College Bowl as a campus malt-shop owner who dispensed sodas and advice to the students.

Through the 1950s, Chico occasionally appeared on a variety of television shows and commercials. Marx starred in The College Bowl, a musical-comedy series that was broadcast on ABC from October 2, 1950, to March 26, 1951. He also appeared with Harpo (and a cameo appearance by Groucho) in "The Incredible Jewelry Robbery", a pantomime episode of General Electric Theater in 1959; This was the final appearance of the three Marx Brothers. Chico's last public appearance was in 1960, playing cards on the television show Championship Bridge. He and his partner lost the game.

== Stage persona ==
Billing himself as Chico (pronounced as "CHICK-oh"), he used an Italian persona for his onstage character. Stereotyped ethnic characters were common with vaudevillians. His questionable Italian ethnicity was specifically referred to twice on film: in their second feature, Animal Crackers, he recognizes someone he knows to be a fish peddler from Czechoslovakia impersonating a respected art collector:

Ravelli (Chico): "How is it you got to be Roscoe W. Chandler?"
Chandler: "Say, how did you get to be an Italian?"
Ravelli: "Never mind—whose confession is this?"

In A Night at the Opera, which begins in Italy, his character, Fiorello, claims not to be Italian, eliciting a surprised look from Groucho:

Driftwood (Groucho): "Well, things seem to be getting better around the country."
Fiorello (Chico): "I don't know, I'm a stranger here myself."

A scene in the film Go West, in which Chico attempts to placate an Indian chief of whom Groucho has run afoul, has a line that plays a bit on Chico's lack of Italian nationality, but is more or less proper Marxian wordplay:

S. Quentin Quale (Groucho): "Can you talk Indian?"
Joe Panello (Chico): "I was born in Indianapolis!"

There are moments, however, where his characters appear to be genuinely Italian; examples include the film The Big Store, in which his character Ravelli runs into an old friend he worked with in Naples (after a brief misunderstanding due to his accent), the film Monkey Business, in which Chico claims his grandfather sailed with Christopher Columbus, and their very first outing The Cocoanuts, where Mr. Hammer (Groucho) asks him if he knew what an auction was, in which he responds "I come from Italy on the Atlantic Auction [Atlantic Ocean]!" Chico's character is often assumed to be dim-witted, as he frequently misunderstands words spoken by other characters (particularly Groucho). However, he often gets the better of the same characters by extorting money from them, either by con or blackmail; again, Groucho is his most frequent target.

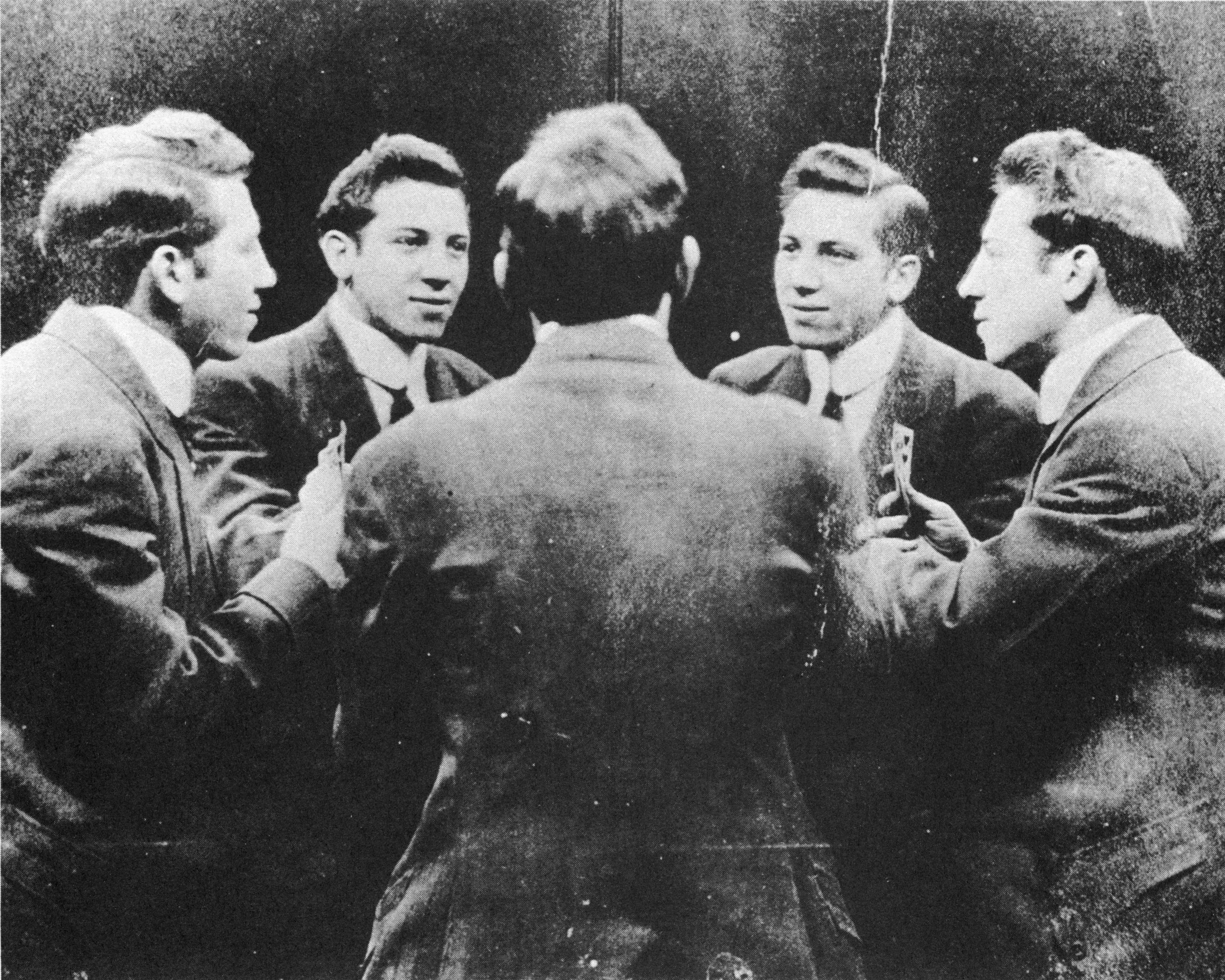
Chico Marx playing cards with himself; taken at Rockaway Beach, New York, in July 1909, aged 22

Chico was a talented pianist. He originally started playing with only his right hand and fake playing with his left, as his teacher did so herself. Although he took lessons, Chico was a largely self-taught pianist. As a young boy, he gained jobs playing piano to earn money for the Marx family. Sometimes Chico even worked playing in two places at the same time. He would acquire the first job with his piano-playing skills, work for a few nights, and then substitute Harpo on one of the jobs. (During their boyhood, Chico and Harpo looked so much alike that they were often mistaken for each other.)

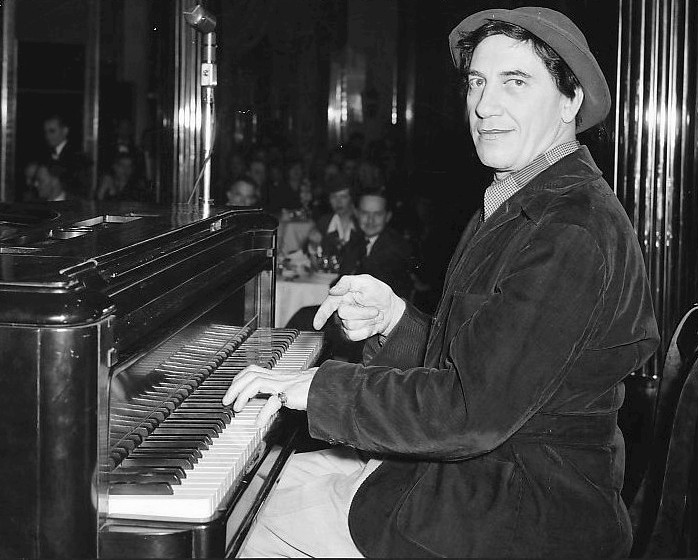
Chico playing his favorite piano at hotel in 1956

In the brothers' last film, Love Happy, Chico plays a piano and violin duet with 'Mr. Lyons' (Leon Belasco). Lyons plays some ornate riffs on the violin; Chico comments, "Look-a, Mister Lyons, I know you wanna make a good impression, but please don't-a play better than me!"

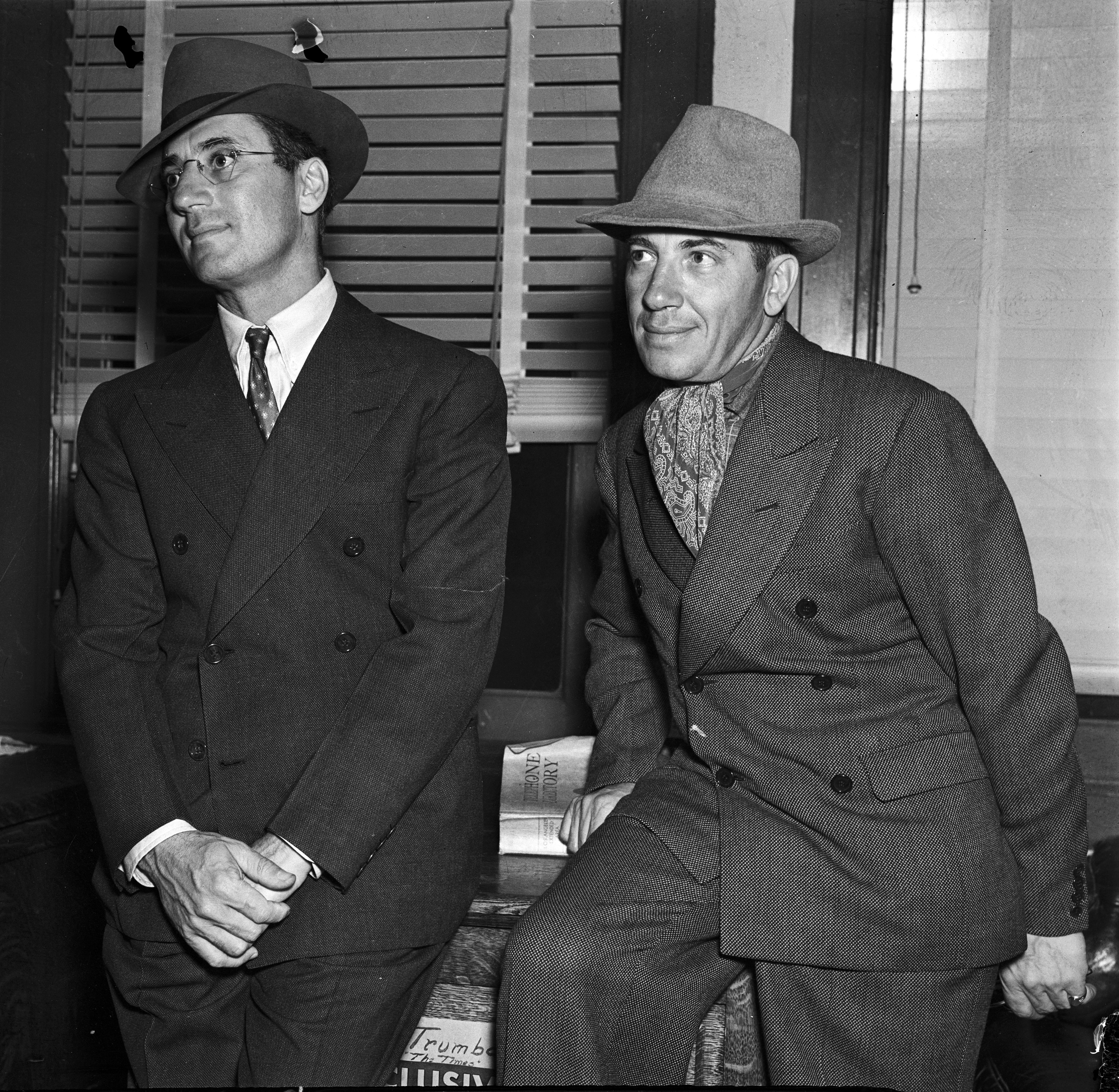
Chico with Groucho on the set of A Day at the Races (1937)

In a record album about the Marx Brothers, narrator Gary Owens stated that "although Chico's technique was limited, his repertoire was not." The opposite was true of Harpo, who reportedly could play only two tunes on the piano, which typically thwarted Chico's scam and resulted in both brothers being fired.

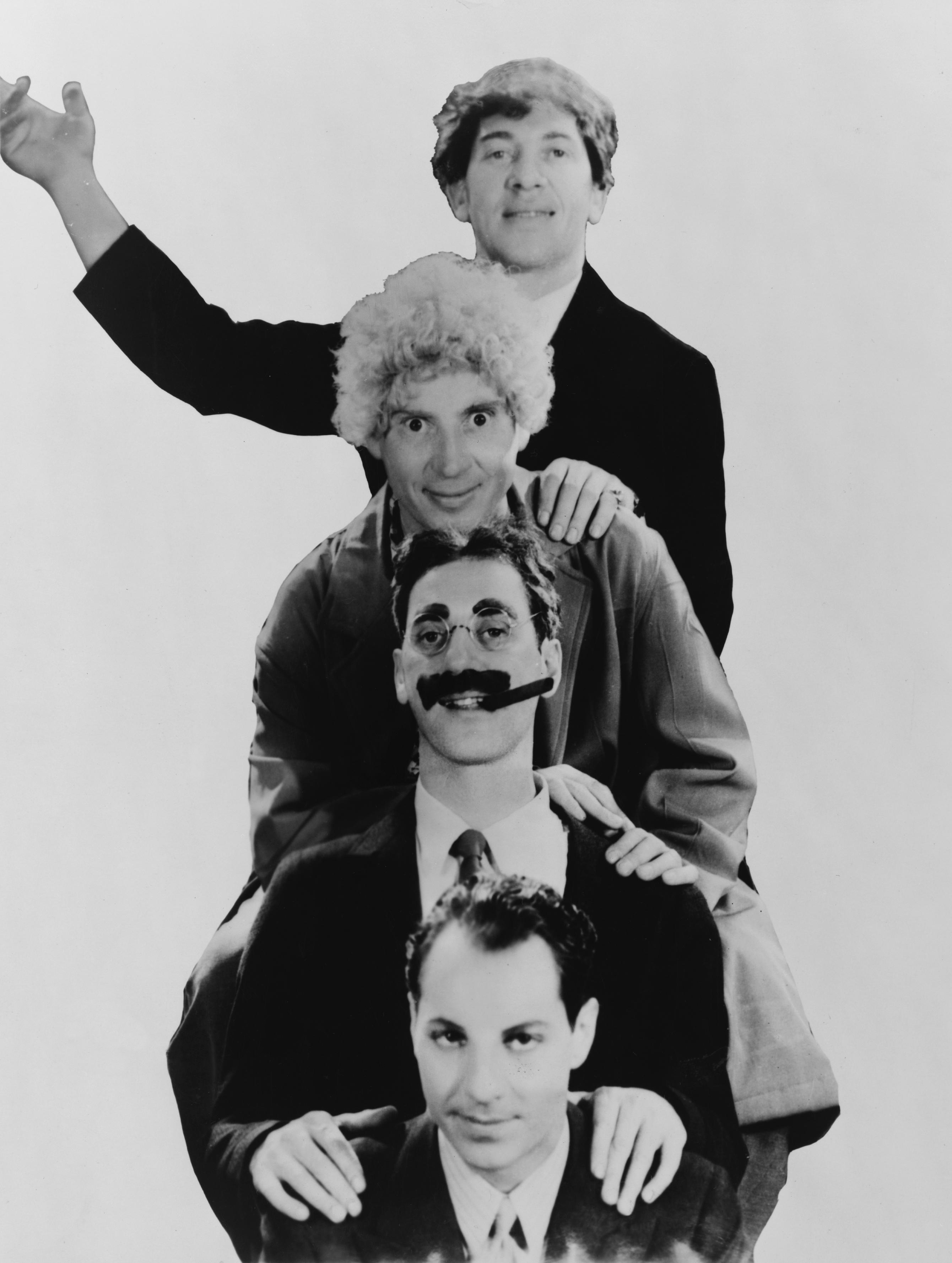
The Marx Brothers, from top: Chico, Harpo, Groucho, and Zeppo Marx

Groucho Marx once said that Chico never practiced the pieces he played. Instead, before performances he soaked his fingers in hot water. He was known for 'shooting' the keys of the piano. He played passages with his thumb up and index finger straight, like a gun, as part of the act. Other examples of his keyboard flamboyance are found in Go West (1940), where he plays the piano by rolling an apple over the keys and A Night in Casablanca (1946), where he performs a rendition of "The Beer Barrel Polka".

== Personal life ==
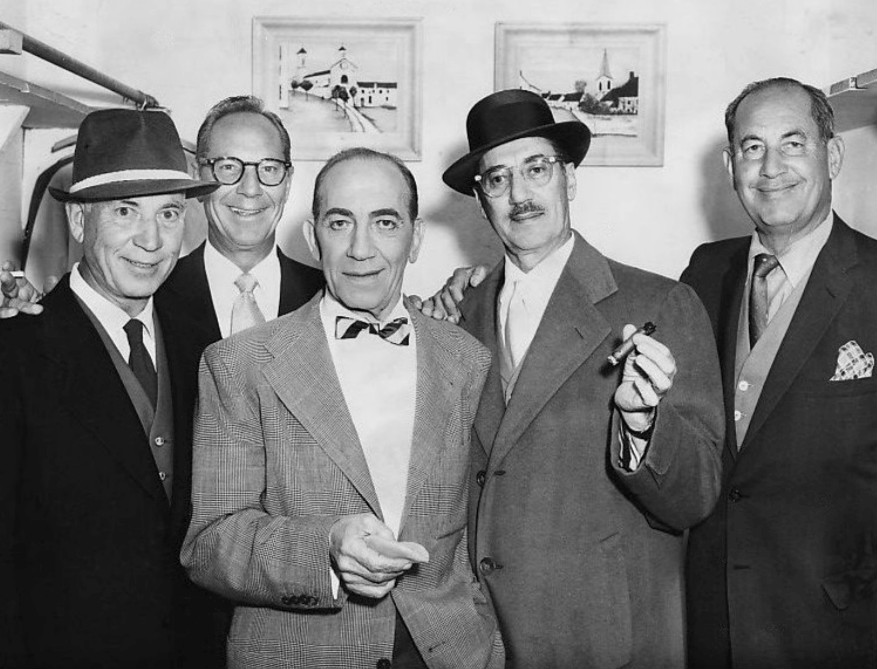
All five Marx brothers (l-r)ː Harpo, Zeppo, Chico, Groucho, and Gummo before their Tonight Show appearance

Chico was married twice. His first marriage was to Betty Karp in 1917. They had a daughter, Maxine (1918–2009). His first marriage was affected by his infidelity, ending in divorce in 1940. He was very close to his daughter Maxine and gave her acting lessons.

Chico's second marriage was to Mary De Vithas. They married in 1958, three years before his death.

=== Gambling ===
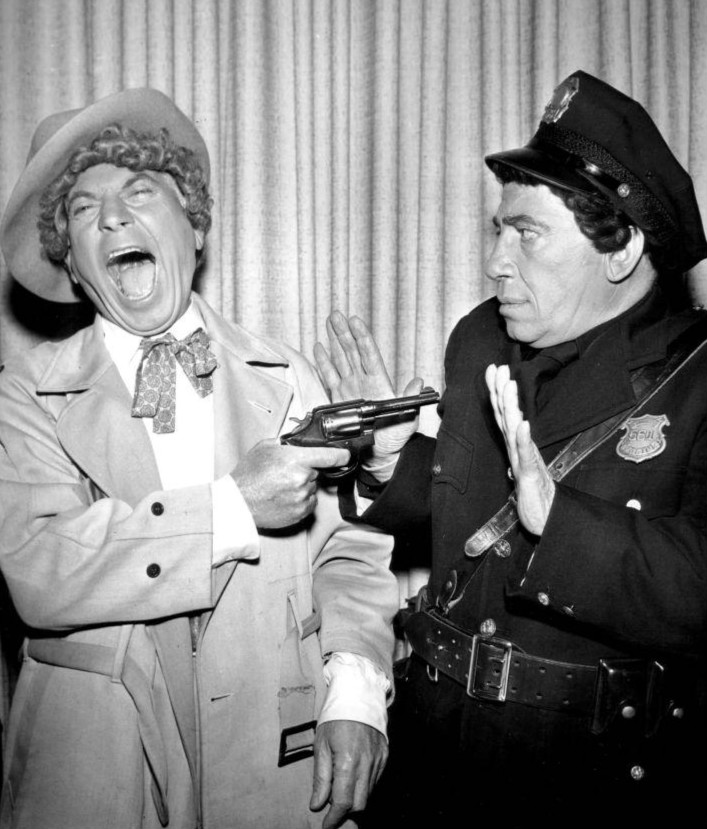
Harpo and Chico in "The Incredible Jewelry Robbery", a 1959 episode of General Electric Theater.

As well as being a compulsive womanizer, Chico had a lifelong addiction to gambling. His favorite gambling pursuits were card games, horse racing, dog racing, and various sports betting. His addiction cost him millions of dollars by his own account. When an interviewer in the late 1930s asked him how much money he had lost from gambling, he answered, "Find out how much money Harpo's got. That's how much I've lost." Chico always bet on longshots and quickly developed a reputation for being a sucker. When out of games, horses, and tips, Chico would make bets with strangers on the street whether the number of the next passing car license plate would be odd or even. Gummo Marx, in an interview years after Chico's death, said: "Chico's favorite people were actors who gambled, producers who gambled, and women who screwed." In reference to Chico's well-known promiscuity, George Jessel quipped, "Chico didn't button his fly until he was seventy."

Chico had a reputation as a world-class pinochle player, a game he and Harpo learned from their father. Groucho said Chico would throw away good cards (with the knowledge of spectators) to make the play "more interesting".

== Death ==
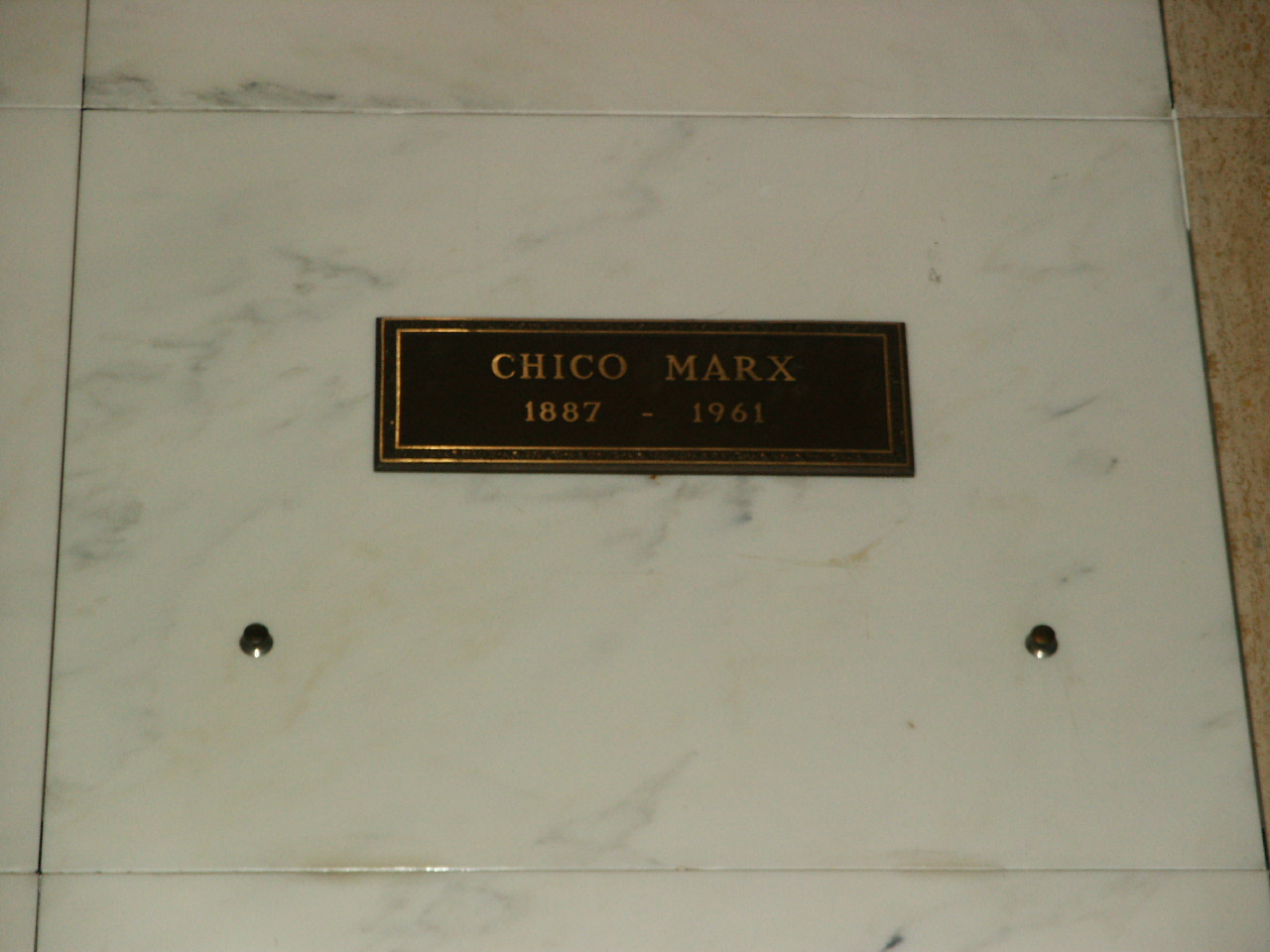
Crypt of Chico Marx

Chico died of arteriosclerosis at the age of 74 on October 11, 1961, at his Hollywood home. He was the eldest brother and the first to die. He was survived by his second wife Mary and daughter Maxine (from his first marriage to Betty Karp).

Chico is entombed in the mausoleum at Forest Lawn Memorial Park Cemetery in Glendale, California. Chico's brother Gummo is in a crypt across the hall from him.

== Awards and honors ==
In the 1974 Academy Awards telecast, Jack Lemmon presented Groucho with an honorary Academy Award to a standing ovation. The award was also for Harpo, Chico, and Zeppo, whom Lemmon mentioned by name. It was one of Groucho's last public appearances. "I wish that Harpo and Chico could be here to share with me this great honor," he said, naming the two deceased brothers (Zeppo was still alive at the time and in the audience). Groucho also praised the late Margaret Dumont as a great straight woman who never understood any of his jokes.

== Portrayals ==
Actor Michael Tucci portrayed Chico alongside Gabe Kaplan as Groucho in the play Groucho (later released on home video under the title Gabe Kaplan as Groucho) originally broadcast on HBO in 1982.

Actors who have portrayed Chico Marx in stage revivals of the Marx Brothers musical plays include Peter Slutsker, Les Marsden, and Matt Roper. Frank Lazarus played Chico in a 1990 radio adaptation of Flywheel, Shyster, and Flywheel.

== Filmography ==
Films

- The Cocoanuts (1929) as Chico (Signor Pastrami)
- Animal Crackers (1930) as Signor Emanuel Ravelli
- The House That Shadows Built (1931) as Tomalio
- Monkey Business (1931) as Chico
- Horse Feathers (1932) as Baravelli
- Duck Soup (1933) as Chicolini
- A Night at the Opera (1935) as Fiorello
- A Day at the Races (1937) as Tony
- Room Service (1938) as Harry Binelli
- At The Circus (1939) as Antonio "Tony" Pirelli
- Go West (1940) as Joseph Panello
- The Big Store (1941) as Ravelli
- A Night in Casablanca (1946) as Corbaccio
- Love Happy (1949) as Faustino the Great
- The Story of Mankind (1957) as a Monk

== Broadway ==
- I'll Say She Is
- The Cocoanuts
- Animal Crackers
