= Monkey Business (1931 film) =

1931 film starring the four Marx Brothers

- theatrical release poster
- Directed by: Norman Z. McLeod
- Written by: S. J. Perelman; Will B. Johnstone; Add'l dialogue Arthur Sheekman; Contrib. writers Al Shean; Nat Perrin
- Produced by: Herman J. Mankiewicz
- Starring: Groucho Marx; Harpo Marx; Chico Marx; Zeppo Marx
- Cinematography: Arthur L. Todd
- Music by: John Leipold
- Production company: Paramount Publix Corp.
- Distributed by: Paramount Publix Corp
- Release date: September 19, 1931
- Running time: 78 minutes
- Country: United States
- Language: English

Monkey Business is a 1931 American pre-Code comedy film. It is the third of the Marx Brothers' released movies (Groucho, Harpo, Chico and Zeppo), and the first with an original screenplay rather than an adaptation of one of their Broadway shows. The film also features Thelma Todd, Harry Woods, Ruth Hall and Rockliffe Fellowes. It is directed by Norman Z. McLeod with screenplay by S. J. Perelman and Will B. Johnstone. It will enter the public domain on January 1, 2027 due to being published in 1931 and subsequently renewed in 1959.

== Plot ==
On board an ocean liner (portrayed by the French ocean liner De Grasse) bound for America, four stowaways hide in wooden barrels in the ship's cargo hold. After singing "Sweet Adeline", they are discovered and the ship's officers spend the rest of the voyage chasing and attempting to catch the stowaways who are running amok. Chico and Harpo pose as barbers and shave off an officer's mustache while he is sleeping; Groucho and Chico lock the ship's captain in a closet and eat his lunch; Groucho hides in the closet of the stateroom of gangster Alky Briggs and his wife, Lucille; Briggs leaves and Groucho begins romancing Lucille until he is caught and threatened by Briggs. Briggs is so taken by Groucho's nerve, he hires both Groucho and Zeppo to cover him while he confronts Big Joe Helton, a rival mob boss and gives them loaded guns, which they immediately ditch in a bucket of water. Chico and Harpo disrupt a chess game and confiscate the board, taking it into the stateroom of Helton and his daughter Mary. After they scare off Briggs during the confrontation with Helton, the mobster is impressed and hires Chico and Harpo to be his bodyguards. Groucho later offers his own protection services to Helton, who says he will think it over.

After the ship docks in the United States, the stowaways realize they need to steal passports to disembark. Zeppo manages to swipe the passport of movie star Maurice Chevalier, and demonstrates his ability to mimic the Frenchman's singing. The four cut in line at customs and Zeppo impersonates Chevalier. He is unsuccessful, however, and Chico, Groucho and Harpo, each attempt unconvincing portrayals of Chevalier singing the same song, with Harpo resorting to strapping a phonograph on his back with an actual record of Chevalier singing. After a man faints, Groucho poses as a doctor and urges the crowd to gather around the unconscious man so he won't recover. Sailors remove the man from the ship on a stretcher, but it's actually the four stowaways hiding under a blanket.

Helton throws a coming-out party for Mary, whom Zeppo met and romanced on board the ship. Groucho is reunited with Lucille at the party, where Chico plays piano and Harpo plays harp. Briggs' men, posing as musicians, kidnap Mary and hold her captive in an old barn. The four stowaways and Helton follow and Zeppo engages in fisticuffs with Alky Briggs, while Groucho delivers ringside commentary. Mary is rescued by Zeppo and Groucho attempts to find a needle in a haystack.

Except in the film's credits the Marx Brothers' characters have no names in this film. They are referred to simply as "the stowaways".

== Cast ==
The four Marx Brothers stow away on an ocean liner by hiding in barrels in this promotional still for Monkey Business. Left to right: Harpo, Zeppo, Chico, Groucho.

- Groucho Marx as Groucho
- Harpo Marx as Harpo
- Chico Marx as Chico
- Zeppo Marx as Zeppo
- Rockliffe Fellowes as J.J. "Big Joe" Helton
- Harry Woods as "Alky" Briggs
- Thelma Todd as Lucille Briggs
- Ruth Hall as Mary Helton
- Tom Kennedy as First Mate Gibson
- Cecil Cunningham as Madame Swempski, opera singer giving interview on ship
- Charlotte Mineau as Emily, woman on veranda of mansion having an illicit affair
- Maxine Castle as Mrs Schmalhausen, opera singer performing "O Sole Mio"
- Rolfe Sedan as the ship's barber
- Evelyn Peirce as Manicurist
- Billy Bletcher as Man buried in deck chair
- Bess Flowers as wife of man dressed as Indian at party
- Cyril Ring as Party guest
- Ben Taggart as Captain Corcoran
- Davison Clark as passport official

== Production ==
Writers S. J. Perelman and Will B. Johnstone were excited to be working with the Marx Brothers. However, producer Herman J. Mankiewicz advised them to lower their expectations. He called the brothers "mercurial, devious, and ungrateful ... I hate to depress you, but you'll rue the day you ever took the assignment. This is an ordeal by fire, make sure you wear asbestos pants." Of the original script delivered by Perelman and Johnstone, Groucho said, "It stinks." He considered Perelman too intellectual to write for the Marx Brothers manic comic style. The final script was the result of five months of work by the brothers, gag writers, director Norman Z. MacLeod and Mankiewicz. MacLeod later said that up to 12 writers worked on the film, and that Eddie Cantor contributed when he visited the set during shooting.

This was the first Marx film to be written specifically for film, and it was the first to be shot in Hollywood. Their first two films were filmed at Paramount Pictures' Astoria Studios in Queens, New York City. Monkey Business was Norman MacLeod's solo directorial debut.

=== Casting ===
This is the first Marx Brothers film not to feature Margaret Dumont: this time their female foil is comedian Thelma Todd, who would also star in the Marx Brothers' next film, Horse Feathers. In December 1935, Todd was found dead in her car, inside her garage apparently from accidental carbon monoxide poisoning. A line of dialogue in Monkey Business seems to foreshadow Todd's death. Alone with Todd in her cabin, Groucho quips: "You're a woman who's been getting nothing but dirty breaks. Well, we can clean and tighten your brakes, but you'll have to stay in the garage all night."

The Marx Brothers' real-life father (Sam "Frenchie" Marx) is briefly seen in a cameo appearance, sitting on top of luggage behind the Brothers on the pier as they wave to the First Mate upon alighting. Sam Marx was 72 at the time, and the appearance was his film debut. He was paid $12.50 each day for two days' work.

=== Censorship ===
Typical for many Marx Brothers films, production censors demanded changes in some lines with sexual innuendo. Monkey Business was banned in Ireland because censors feared it would encourage anarchic tendencies. In Ireland, the film was passed on January 8, 1932, with "16 unspecified cuts to script", including characters falling over each other in a dance scene.

== Music ==
Early on in Monkey Business, the Brothers—playing stowaways concealed in barrels—harmonize unseen while performing the popular song "Sweet Adeline". It is a matter of debate whether Harpo joins in with the singing. (One of the ship's crew asserts to the captain that he knows there are four stowaways because he can hear them singing "Sweet Adeline".) If so, it would be one of only a few times Harpo used speech on screen, as opposed to other vocalizations such as whistling or sneezing. At least one other possible on-screen utterance occurs in the film A Day at the Races (1937), in which Groucho, Chico, and Harpo are heard singing "Down by the Old Mill Stream" in three-part harmony.

=== Songs ===
One of the sequences in this film involves the four brothers attempting to get off the ship using a passport stolen from singer Maurice Chevalier. Each brother impersonates Chevalier and sings "You Brought a New Kind of Love to Me" in turn. This poses a problem for the mute Harpo, who mimes to a hidden phonograph tied to his back.

When Zeppo first meets gangster Joe Helton's daughter Mary on the promenade of the ocean liner, "Just One More Chance" by Arthur Johnston and Sam Coslow can be heard playing in the background. Chico performs two pieces on the piano, the "Pizzicato" from Sylvia by Léo Delibes, which then morphs into the song "When I Take My Sugar to Tea", written by Sammy Fain, Irving Kahal, and Pierre Norman. Harpo performs "I'm Daffy over You" by Sol Violinsky and Chico. The dance band at Mary's debut party is playing the song "Ho Hum!" when the Marx Brothers arrive.

=== Musical numbers ===
- "Sweet Adeline", music by Harry Armstrong, lyrics by Richard Gerard
- "Just One More Chance", by Arthur Johnston and Sam Coslow
- "You Brought a New Kind of Love to Me", music and lyrics by Irving Kahal, Pierre Norman and Sammy Fain
- "Pizzicato" from Sylvia by Léo Delibes, played on the piano by Chico
- "When I Take My Sugar to Tea" by Sammy Fain, Irving Kahal, and Pierre Norman
- "O Sole Mio" sung by opera singer Maxine Castle with harp accompaniment by Harpo; music by Eduardo di Capua, lyrics by Giovanni Capurro
- "I'm Daffy Over You" by Chico Marx and Sol Violinsky (Solly Ginsberg)

== Reception and impact ==
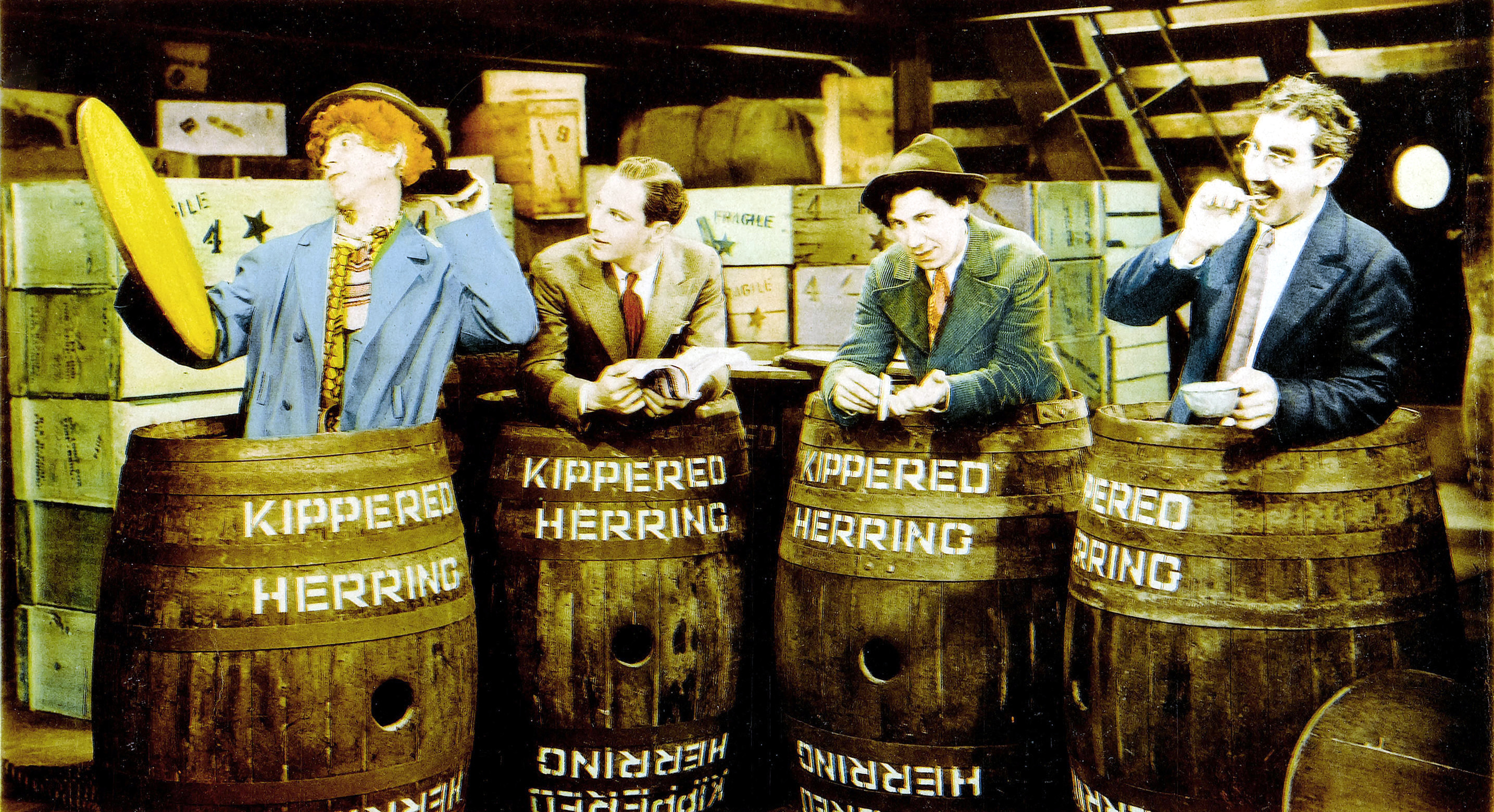
Left to right: Harpo, Zeppo, Chico, and Groucho.

Monkey Business was a critical and box office success, and it is considered one of the Marx Brothers' best and funniest films.

Contemporary reviews were positive. Mordaunt Hall of The New York Times wrote, "Whether it is really as funny as 'Animal Crackers' is a matter of opinion. Suffice it to say that few persons will be able to go to the Rivoli and keep a straight face." Variety's review began, "The usual Marx madhouse and plenty of laughs sprouting from a plot structure resembling one of those California bungalows which sprout up overnight." Film Daily agreed that the plot was "flimsy", but also found the film "crammed all the way with laughs and there's never a dead spot." John Mosher of The New Yorker thought the film was "the best this family has given us."

== Legacy and influence ==
The film was evidently based on two routines the Marx Brothers did during their early days in vaudeville (Home Again and Mr. Green's Reception), along with a story idea from one of Groucho's friends, Bert Granet, called The Seas Are Wet. The passport scene is a reworking of a stage sketch in which the brothers burst into a theatrical agent's office auditioning an impersonation of a current big star. It appeared in their stage shows On the Mezzanine Floor and I'll Say She Is (1924). This skit was also done by the Marxes in the Paramount promotional film The House That Shadows Built (1931).

The concept of the Marx Brothers being stowaways on a ship was repeated in an episode of their radio series Flywheel, Shyster, and Flywheel (1933), in the episode "The False Roderick", and was also recycled in their MGM film A Night at the Opera (1935).

== Awards and honors ==
- 2000: AFI's 100 Years...100 Laughs – #73

== Proposed Sequel ==
According to Turner Classic Movies' Robert Osborne, a sequel was planned for this film that would continue the gangster theme. During the development of that film, aviator Charles Lindbergh's son was kidnapped and killed by what were believed to be gangsters. The writers quickly shifted gears and instead based the next film, Horse Feathers, very loosely on the Marx Brothers' earlier stage show Fun in Hi Skule.

== See also ==
- List of United States comedy films
