= Horse Feathers =

1932 film starring the Marx Brothers

- Poster by Al Hirschfeld
- Directed by: Norman Z. McLeod
- Written by: S. J. Perelman; Bert Kalmar; Harry Ruby; Will B. Johnstone; Arthur Sheekman (uncredited)
- Produced by: Herman J. Mankiewicz (uncredited)
- Starring: Groucho Marx; Harpo Marx; Chico Marx; Zeppo Marx; Thelma Todd; David Landau
- Cinematography: Ray June
- Music by: John Leipold; Harry Ruby
- Distributed by: Paramount Pictures
- Release date: August 19, 1932
- Running time: 68 minutes
- Country: United States
- Language: English
- Budget: $647,000
- Box office: $945,000 (U.S. and Canada rentals)

Horse Feathers is a 1932 American pre-Code comedy film starring the four Marx Brothers (Groucho, Harpo, Chico, and Zeppo), Thelma Todd and David Landau. It was written by Bert Kalmar, Harry Ruby, S. J. Perelman, and Will B. Johnstone. Kalmar and Ruby also wrote the original songs for the film. Several of the film's gags were taken from the Marx Brothers' stage comedy from the 1900s, Fun in Hi Skule. The term horse feathers is U.S. slang for "nonsense, rubbish, balderdash," attributed originally to Billy DeBeck. As a work published in 1932 and renewed within 28 years, it will enter the public domain on January 1, 2028. (Note: Under R249564)

== Plot ==
The film revolves around college football and a game between the fictional Darwin and Huxley Colleges. (Note: Thomas Henry Huxley was a defender of Charles Darwin's theory of evolution.) Professor Quincy Adams Wagstaff, the new president of Huxley College, is convinced by his son Frank, a student at the school, to recruit professional football players to help Huxley's losing football team. Baravelli is an "iceman", who delivers ice and bootleg liquor from a local speakeasy. Pinky is also an "iceman" and a part-time dogcatcher. Through a series of misunderstandings, Baravelli and Pinky are accidentally recruited to play for Huxley instead of the actual professional players.

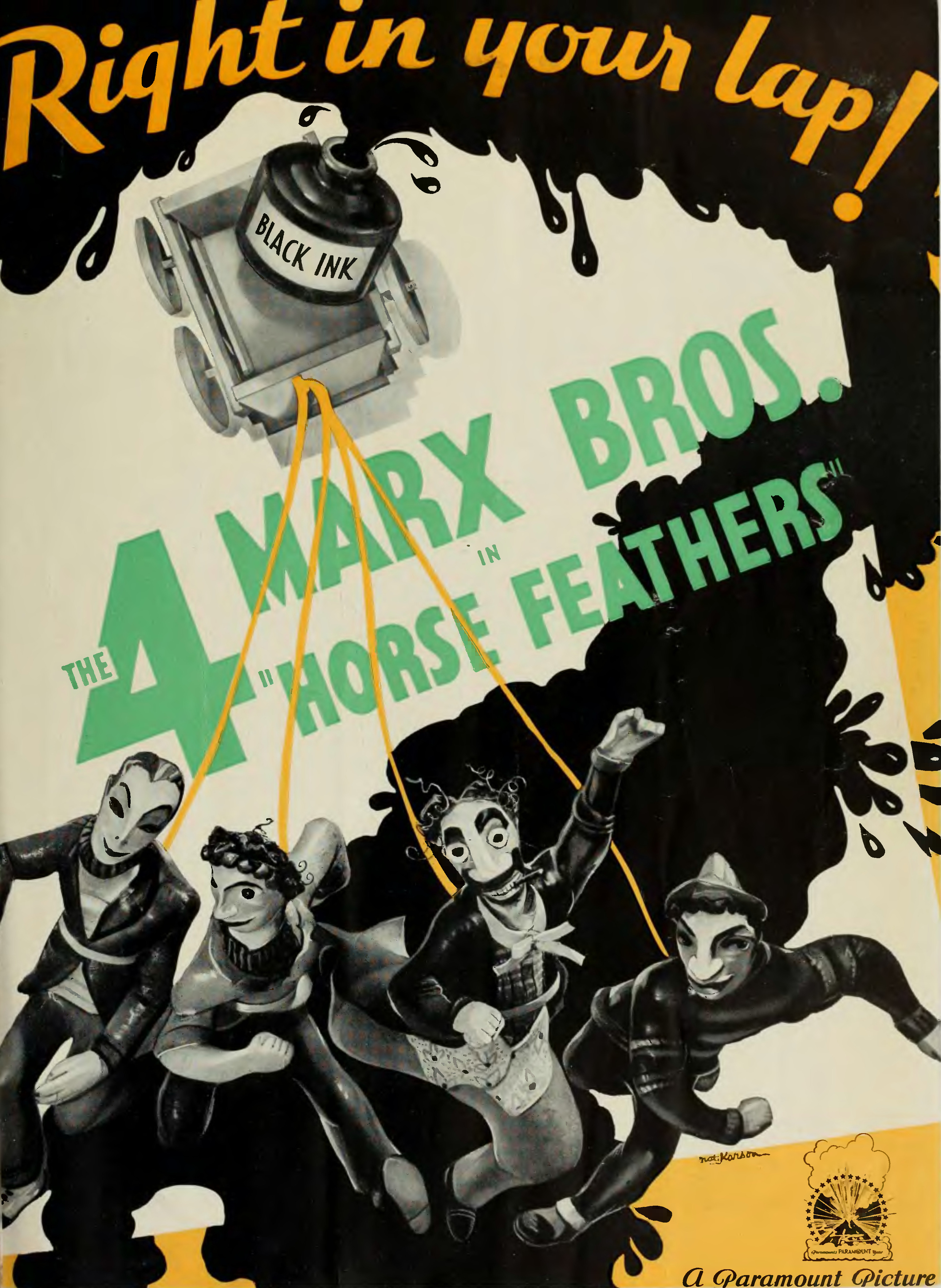
Ad in The Film Daily, 1932

The climax of the film, which ESPN listed as first in its "top 11 scenes in football movie history," includes the four protagonists winning the football game by successfully performing a version of the hidden ball trick and then scoring the winning touchdown in a horse-drawn garbage wagon that Pinky rides like a chariot. A picture of the brothers in the "chariot" near the end of the film made the cover of Time magazine in 1932.

== Cast ==
- Groucho Marx as Professor Quincy Adams Wagstaff
- Harpo Marx as "Pinky"
- Chico Marx as Baravelli
- Zeppo Marx as Frank Wagstaff
- Thelma Todd as Connie Bailey
- David Landau as Jennings

Uncredited cast

- Robert Greig as Biology Professor Giving Lecture
- Reginald Barlow as Retiring College President
- E. H. Calvert as Professor In Wagstaff's Office
- Nat Pendleton as MacHardie, Darwin Football Player
- James Pierce as Mullen, Darwin Football Player
- Theresa Harris as Laura, Connie's Maid
- Sheila Bromley as Wagstaff's Receptionist
- Phil Tead as Football Commentator
- Ben Taggart as The Cop Who Tries to Give Harpo A Ticket
- Edgar Dearing as The Bartender In The Speakeasy
- Vince Barnett as Speakeasy Patron

== Musical numbers ==
- "I'm Against It"
- "I Always Get My Man"
- "Everyone Says I Love You"
- "Collegiate" (Chico playing)
- "Bridal Chorus"
- "Wedding March"

The film prominently features the song "Everyone Says I Love You", by Bert Kalmar and Harry Ruby. (This song was later the title song of a 1996 Woody Allen movie). All four brothers perform the song, almost every time as a serenade to Connie Bailey. Zeppo leads with a "straight" verse:

Everyone says I love you
The cop on the corner and the burglar too
The preacher in the pulpit and the man in the pew
Says I love you.

Harpo whistles it once to his horse, and he later plays it on the harp to serenade Miss Bailey. Chico sings a comic verse, with his standard fake Italian accent, while playing piano:

Everyone says I love you
The great big mosquito when-a he sting you
The fly when he gets stuck on the flypaper too
Says I love you.

Groucho sings a sarcastic verse, sitting in a canoe strumming a guitar as Miss Bailey paddles. This is in line with his suspicions about the college widow's intentions throughout the film.

Everyone says I love you
But just what they say it for I never knew
It's just inviting trouble for the poor sucker who
Says I love you.

== Notable scenes ==
The film's trailer

In the opening number Wagstaff and a group of college professors sing and dance in full academic robes and mortarboard hats:

I don't know what they have to say
It makes no difference anyway;
Whatever it is, I'm against it!

A later scene features Baravelli guarding the speakeasy and Wagstaff trying to get in. The password for entry is "Swordfish". This sequence degenerates into a series of puns:

Wagstaff: I got it! Haddock.
Baravelli: 'At's a-funny, I got a haddock too.
Wagstaff: What do you take for a haddock?
Baravelli: Well, Sometimes I take an aspirin, sometimes I take a calomel.
Wagstaff: Say, I'd walk a mile for a calomel.
Baravelli: You mean chocolate calomel? I like-a that too, but you no guess it.

At the door, Pinky is also asked the password. He responds by pulling a fish from his coat and sticking a small sword down its throat.

Later Wagstaff and Baravelli debate the cost of ice. Wagstaff argues that his bill should be much smaller than it is:

Baravelli: I make you proposition. You owe us $200, we take 2000 and we call it square.
Wagstaff: That's not a bad idea. I tell you what ... I'll consult my lawyer. And if he advises me to do it, I'll get a new lawyer.

And on another subject:

Baravelli: Last week, for eighteen dollars, I gotta co-ed with two pair of pants.
Wagstaff: Since when has a co-ed got two pair of pants?
Baravelli: Since I joined the college.

A notable scene taken from the earlier revue Fun in Hi Skule consists of the brothers disrupting an anatomy class. The professor asks for a student to explain the symptoms of cirrhosis. Baravelli obliges:

So roses are red
So violets are blue
So sugar is sweet
So so are you.

The professor protests that his facts are in order: Baravelli and Pinky bear him out. Wagstaff takes over the class and continues the lecture.

Wagstaff: Let us follow a corpuscle on its journey ... Now then, baboons, what is a corpuscle?
Baravelli: That's easy! First is a captain ... then a lieutenant ... then is a corpuscle!
Wagstaff: That's fine. Why don't you bore a hole in yourself and let the sap run out?

A little later, Wagstaff advises Pinky that he can't burn the candle at both ends. Pinky then reaches into his trenchcoat, and produces a candle burning at both ends.

Foreshadowing the "stateroom" scene from the 1935 film A Night at the Opera, all four Marx brothers and the main antagonist take turns going in and out of Connie Bailey's room, and eventually their movements pile up on each other, resulting in a crowded, bustling scene, notable both by Groucho's breaking of the fourth wall during Chico's piano solo, and his constant opening of his umbrella and removing his overshoes upon entering the room. The overshoes were commonly known as 'rubbers', a reference to contraceptives, a visual gag about Groucho's intentions towards Connie.

Eventually, Pinky and Baravelli are sent to kidnap two of the rival college's star players to prevent them from playing in the big game. The intended victims (who are much larger men than Pinky and Baravelli) manage to kidnap the pair instead, removing their outer clothing and locking them in a room. Pinky and Baravelli make their escape by sawing their way out through the floor. The saws came from a tool bag Pinky carried with them that held their kidnappers' tools, which included, among other things, rope, chisels, hammers and at one point, a small pig. This is an example of the surreal edge of Marx Brothers humor.

One direct example of that influence occurs in the speakeasy scene. Two men are playing cards, and one says to the other, "cut the cards". Pinky happens to walk by at that moment, pulls a hatchet out of his trenchcoat and chops the deck in half. This none-too-subtle gag, recycled from the brothers' first Broadway show, I'll Say She Is (1924), was repeated by Curly Howard against Moe Howard in The Three Stooges' short Ants in the Pantry (1936), and by Bugs Bunny in Bugs Bunny Rides Again (1948).

== Reception ==
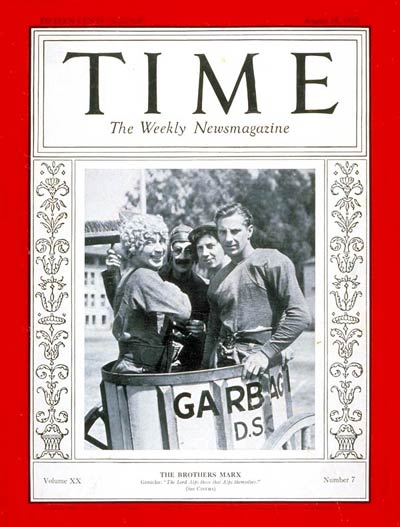
Cover of Time (August 15, 1932)

Mordaunt Hall of The New York Times wrote that the film "aroused riotous laughter from those who packed the theatre" on opening night. "Some of the fun is even more reprehensible than the doings of these clowns in previous films," Hall wrote, "but there is no denying that their antics and their patter are helped along by originality and ready wit." "Laffs galore, swell entertainment," wrote Variety, while Film Daily reported, "Full of laughs that will rock any house." John Mosher of The New Yorker called the film "a rather more slight and trivial affair than the other Marx offerings," but still acknowledged the Marxes as "very special; there is no one else like Groucho or Harpo on stage or screen, and probably never will be. So familiar now is the sense of humor they arouse that the mere idea of their presence starts a laugh."

The film is recognized by American Film Institute in these lists:

- 2000: AFI's 100 Years ... 100 Laughs – #65
- 2005: AFI's 100 Years ... 100 Movie Quotes:
  - Baravelli: "You sing-a high."

Connie Bailey: "Yes, I have a falsetto voice."
Baravelli: "That's-a funny; my last pupil she got-a false set-a teeth."
– Nominated

- 2008: AFI's 10 Top 10:
  - Nominated Sports Film

== Production ==
The caricatures of the four brothers that are briefly flashed during the credits are taken from a promotional poster from their previous film, Monkey Business.

=== Chico's injury ===
Production of the film was hindered when Chico was severely injured in a car accident, suffering a shattered knee and multiple broken ribs. This delayed production by more than two months and limited Chico's participation in filming.

As a result, the movie was filmed so that Chico was sitting down in the majority of scenes he was in. It required a body double to be used in some of the football scenes, most notably during the shot where the Four Marx Brothers chase a horse-drawn garbage wagon, climb in and head off in the opposite direction; Chico's double is taller than the other brothers by several inches.

== Period references ==
A term that occurs often in Horse Feathers, but may not be familiar to modern viewers, is college widow (see also The College Widow, a 1904 play). The somewhat derogatory term referred to a young woman who remains near a college year after year to associate with male students. It is used to describe Connie Bailey. Such women were considered "easy". Miss Bailey is shown to be involved with each of the characters played by the Brothers, as well as the principal antagonist Jennings.

At one point during the climactic football game, Wagstaff exclaims, "Jumping anaconda!" This is a ‘minced oath’, an expression used in sports stories of the time to show the colourful language used by coaches, without using actual samples, not then considered fit to print. This particular one also alludes to the notorious stock market performance of Anaconda Copper immediately preceding the Great Depression. All of the Marx Brothers had experienced severe losses in the Wall Street Crash of 1929. Groucho had delivered other jokes related to the stock market in the Brothers' preceding films (for example, "The stockholder of yesteryear is the stowaway of today" in Monkey Business), and used Anaconda itself in a Eugene O’Neill parody in 1930's Animal Crackers.

The climactic final scenes on the gridiron, featuring the Marx Brothers driving a chariot, showcase one of the sport's last vestiges of its rugby origins. This is visible via the original unpadded H-structured timber rugby goalposts at the back of the end zone. Until 1927 in college football these H-posts were situated on the goal line. The modern, single-support goal posts were first used in 1966.

== Missing sequences ==
In this now lost, deleted scene from Horse Feathers, the Marx Brothers are seen playing poker as Huxley College goes up in flames around them

The only existing prints of this film are missing several minutes, owing to censorship and damage. The damage is most noticeable in jump cuts during the scene in which Groucho, Chico and Harpo visit Connie Bailey's apartment.

Connie: Baravelli, you overcome me.
Baravelli: All right, but remember—it was your idea.

Several sequences were cut from the film, including an extended ending to the apartment scene, additional scenes with Pinky as a dogcatcher, and a sequence in which the brothers play poker as the college burns down. (A description of the latter scene still exists in a pressbook from the year of the film's release, along with a still photograph.) The August 15, 1932 Time magazine review of the film says of Harpo in the speakeasy scene, "He bowls grapefruit at bottles on the bar." This joke is also missing from the current print.

== See also ==
- List of American football films
- List of United States comedy films
- List of incomplete or partially lost films
