= List of Flywheel, Shyster, and Flywheel episodes =

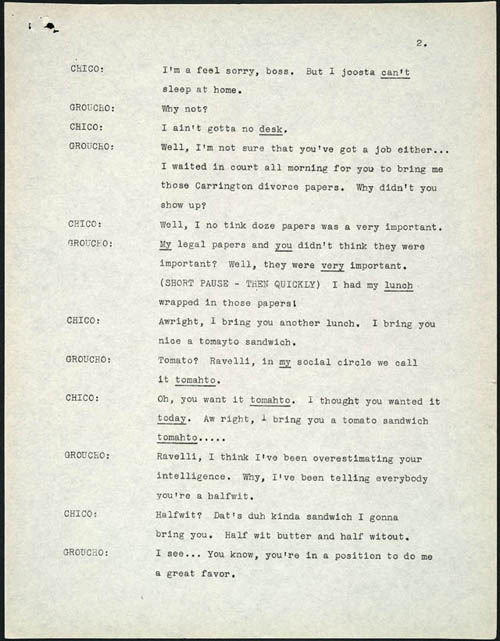
A sample page from a January 23, 1933 typed manuscript of the 1932-33 NBC radio show Flywheel, Shyster, and Flywheel that starred The Marx Brothers Groucho and Chico.

Flywheel, Shyster, and Flywheel is a situation comedy old-time radio show starring two of the Marx Brothers, Groucho and Chico, and written primarily by Nat Perrin and Arthur Sheekman. It was broadcast in the United States on the National Broadcasting Company's Blue Network to thirteen network affiliates in nine Eastern and Southern states. The show aired Monday nights at 7:30 p.m. beginning November 28, 1932, and ended May 22, 1933. It was the Monday night installment of the Five-Star Theater, a variety series that offered a different program each weeknight, and was sponsored by the Standard Oil Companies of New Jersey, Pennsylvania and Louisiana, to compete with Texaco's Fire Chief which starred Ed Wynn. Episodes were broadcast live from NBC's WJZ station in New York City and later from a sound stage at Radio Pictures in Los Angeles, California, before returning to WJZ for the final episodes.

The show depicted the misadventures of a small New York law firm, with Groucho acting as attorney Waldorf T. Flywheel (a crafty, and dishonest, lawyer), and Chico playing Flywheel's assistant Emmanuel Ravelli (a half-wit who can barely understand English, and who Flywheel uses as a fall guy). The series was titled Beagle, Shyster, and Beagle for the first three episodes, with Groucho's character initially called Waldorf T. Beagle, until a real lawyer from New York named Beagle contacted NBC and threatened a lawsuit unless it stopped using the name.

The show garnered respectable ratings for its early evening time slot, but did not return for a second season. The Co-Operative Analysis of Broadcasting (CAB) Rating (Note: The CAB rating is the percentage of radio-set owners polled in a given area, who are listening to a given show. Thus, if out of 100 radio-set owners polled in the area covered by the broadcast, 20 report that they listened, then the rating which appears in the report is 20. The percentage is not a percentage of the listening audience, but of the radio-set owners interviewed.) for the show was 22.1% and placed 12th in the highest rated evening programs of the 1932–33 season. The CAB Rating was not disappointing – popular established shows such as The Shadow and The Adventures of Sherlock Holmes did not perform as well – but it was less than half the 44.8% CAB Rating of Fire Chief, which was sponsored by Standard Oil's rival Texaco and placed 3rd in the highest rated programs of the season.

There are twenty-six episodes of Flywheel, Shyster, and Flywheel. Each episode was introduced by the Blue Network announcer, and featured approximately fifteen-minutes of drama, ten minutes of orchestral music between acts, and concluded with a sixty-second skit promoting Esso and Essolube, performed by Groucho and Chico as themselves. The episodes were thought not to have been recorded, as was the practice at the time, but in the 1980s twenty-five of the twenty-six scripts were discovered in the Library of Congress. Adaptations of the recovered scripts were performed before modern audiences and then broadcast, on BBC Radio 4 in the UK, between 1990 and 1993. Subsequently, a recording of the 26th episode from the original 1932-33 series was discovered, which was then broadcast by the BBC in 2005.

== Episodes ==
Episode #	Airdate
1	November 28, 1932
Emmanuel Ravelli comes into the office of Beagle, Shyster, and Beagle, Attorneys at Law, seeking a divorce for his brother and his wife, whose cooking Ravelli dislikes and believes should not be fed to his brother. Upon mentioning he has no job, Waldorf T. Beagle offers Ravelli a position in the law firm as his assistant. Mr. Jones comes into the office wishing to divorce his wife, whom he suspects of cheating. Beagle assigns Ravelli to shadow the wife to catch her with her lover. After trailing her for two weeks Ravelli reveals that Mrs. Jones' lover is Beagle. Jones, outraged, informs Beagle that he no longer requires his services and will be looking for a new attorney.
2	December 5, 1932
Beagle's landlord Mr. Scrooge comes to the office to collect his rent which is six months past due. Beagle gives him the runaround, and after threatening to sue him, Scrooge storms out. Beagle sends Ravelli out on to the streets to find new clients, but after hustling a number of passersby to no avail, Ravelli tries out a new tactic. He decides to push the next person he sees into the path of a wagon to sue the wagon owner; however, that person is Beagle, who ends up being trampled on by a horse. Eventually, Ravelli finds a potential client – a landlord who wishes to dispossess his tenant. When Ravelli brings Scrooge to meet Beagle he demands his rent once again. Beagle lies to Scrooge, telling him he has a big case coming up, and Scrooge decides to allow Beagle additional time to pay.
3	December 12, 1932
Ravelli brings John Smith, a new client, into the office to update his will. As Beagle and Smith read through the updated document, Beagle repeatedly attempts to make himself the sole beneficiary, despite Smith's objections. Days later, Beagle and Ravelli visit Smith's house, but when they arrive they find that the homeowner has never heard of the man. Smith eventually returns to the office, to Beagle's delight; however, he discovers that Smith is a dangerous escapee from the local asylum.
4	December 19, 1932
After getting a divorce, Beagle changes his surname back to "Flywheel". Mrs. Brittenhouse, a society woman employs Flywheel and Ravelli to guard her daughter's wedding gifts at her wedding reception. When they arrive at Mrs. Brittenhouse's home, her butler shows her to the room containing the gifts. After watching the presents for a while, a man enters and offers to take over, allowing Flywheel and Ravelli to take a break. Upon their return, however, they discover that all the gifts are missing. Ravelli reveals to Flywheel and Mrs. Brittenhouse that he did watch the gifts as instructed – until the man finished loading them into his truck and drove away.
5	December 26, 1932
Flywheel and Ravelli are accidentally locked out of their office on Christmas Day. While standing in the street and pounding on the door they meet Horace, a young boy who has become separated from his father while carol singing, and is now lost. When he complains of being hungry, they take him to a restaurant for Christmas dinner. As neither Flywheel nor Ravelli are able to pay for their bill, the restaurant puts Ravelli to work as a dishwasher, and Flyhweel as a waiter. They are unable to work efficiently, however, as Ravelli breaks the plates and dishes, and Flywheel insults the customers. When they are taken to the restaurant manager, they find that he is Horace's father, and ask that their reward be a free meal.
6	January 2, 1933
Ravelli is arrested for a number of crimes, including fighting, damaging property and harassment, and is taken to jail. Flywheel visits him, but Ravelli is happy to stay in jail where he can eat and sleep in peace, without being constantly bothered by Flywheel. During Ravelli's trial, both he and Flywheel turn the proceedings into a mockery by insulting the judge, District Attorney, court clerk and jury; however, the jury still return a not guilty verdict, much to the judge's dismay.
7	January 9, 1933
Flywheel instructs Ravelli to "chase ambulances" but Ravelli has a better idea. He switches the law office's door sign with that of the doctor downstairs, so the sick and injured can come to them, and goes to the drugstore to buy as many different medications as possible. They are visited by Mrs. Carroway, who is feeling dizzy and weak. After making some unsuccessful diagnoses, Flywheel sends her home with the wrong medicine. Flywheel and Ravelli make a housecall to Mrs. Carroway, who is still feeling ill and has called another physician for a second opinion. Dr. Perrin arrives, quickly diagnosing Mrs. Carroway with rheumatism and calling Flywheel unethical. He and Mrs. Carroway realise that Flywheel and Ravelli are imposters, and throw them out of the house by the butler.
8	January 16, 1933
Flywheel and Ravelli are asked to prepare Mrs. Jackson's income tax. They take a taxi to her millinery shop, but it is commandeered by a police officer to follow a car full of gunmen who have robbed a bank. The bank robbers begin shooting at the taxi, with bullets shattering the windows and narrowly missing Ravelli and Flywheel. The officer instructs the driver to continue to follow the robbers, until they reach the state border. The driver turns around and takes Flywheel and Ravelli to their Mrs. Jackson's shop, charging them $56 for the journey. He waits outside while Flywheel attempts to extort the money from Mrs. Jackson by telling her she owes $56 in back taxes, but she refuses to pay such a high fee. She tells them she needs a taxi to take her to the government offices, and Flywheel tricks her into agreeing to pay whatever the taxi meter reads when she arrives.
9	January 23, 1933
After another argument with Flywheel, Ravelli announces he will quit. Flywheel helps Ravelli find a job in the newspaper, but when they see an advertisement for a lost dog with a $500 reward, Flywheel decides to become a dogcatcher. He spends the day corralling stray dogs, but the owners of the neighboring offices complain about the noise of all the barking dogs. Ravelli returns to the office claiming to have found the missing dog from the newspaper advertisement. Mrs. Dimple points out that it does not have any spots and is not the same dog, so Flywheel paints some spots on it. Flywheel takes it to the address in the newspaper, but the owner tells him that her dog was already returned. Ravelli tells him the house next door is offering a reward for a lost dog, and they should try there, since that is where he stole it from.
10	January 30, 1933
Ravelli takes it on the chin
11	February 6, 1933
Flywheel disrobes an Indian faker
12	January 13, 1933
Ravelli is kidnapped
13	January 20, 1933
Flywheel nearly buys the Farm
14	January 27, 1933
Flywheel Treads The Boards
15	March 6, 1933
Flywheel runs a Department Store
16	March 13, 1933
Flywheel and Ravelli fix some votes
17	March 20, 1933
Flywheel and Ravelli investigate a Crime
18	March 27, 1933
Flywheel and Ravelli join the carnival
19	April 3, 1933
Flywheel receives a hotel
20	April 10, 1933
Flywheel and Ravelli have a sleep over with a ghost
21	April 17, 1933
No script or recording is believed to exist.
22	April 24, 1933
Flywheel and Ravelli go prospecting
23	May 1, 1933
Ravelli finds a diamond
24	May 8, 1933
Flywheel and Ravelli inherit a bus
25	May 15, 1933
Flywheel and Ravelli go into pictures
26	May 22, 1933
Flywheel and Ravelli are stowaways on an ocean cruise, hiding from the ship's crew in a lifeboat. To evade capture, Flywheel impersonates the famed African explorer Sir Roderick Mortimer, with Ravelli as his assistant. Mrs. Rivington, a society woman, meets them at the boat to bring them to her Long Island mansion. While giving an impromptu lecture on life in Africa (taken directly from the Marx Brothers' film Animal Crackers), word of an escaped circus lion reaches Flywheel and his audience. Taking the opportunity to sneak out when the real Sir Roderick arrives, Flywheel and Ravelli are chased by the lion into the back of a waiting paddy wagon, taking them back to jail. This is the last episode of the radio series.

== See also ==
List of Flywheel, Shyster, and Flywheel (1990 radio series) episodes
