= 34th Tony Awards =

1980 US theatrical awards ceremony

- Date: June 8, 1980
- Location: Mark Hellinger Theatre, New York City, New York
- Hosted by: Mary Tyler Moore and Jason Robards
- Most wins: Evita (7)
- Most nominations: Evita (11)

Television/radio coverage
- Network: CBS

The 34th Annual Tony Awards was broadcast by CBS television on June 8, 1980, from the Mark Hellinger Theatre. The hosts were Mary Tyler Moore and Jason Robards. The theme was "understudies"; each of the hosts and presenters had been understudies and offered anecdotes of that beginning. The telecast garnered more than 13.89 million households in the United States, making it the Tonys TV broadcast watched by the largest number of households in history.

== Eligibility ==
Shows that opened on Broadway during the 1979–1980 season before May 15, 1980 are eligible.

Original plays

- Bent
- Betrayal
- Charlotte
- Children of a Lesser God
- Clothes for a Summer Hotel
- Devour the Snow
- Dogg's Hamlet, Cahoot's Macbeth
- Goodbye Fidel
- Harold and Maude
- Heartaches of a Pussycat
- Hide and Seek
- Home
- Horowitz and Mrs. Washington
- I Ought to Be in Pictures
- The Lady from Dubuque
- Last Licks
- Lone Star
- Loose Ends
- Mister Lincoln
- Night and Day
- Nuts
- Once a Catholic
- Past Tense
- Pvt. Wars
- The Roast
- Romantic Comedy
- Strider
- Talley's Folly
- Teibele and Her Demon

Original musicals

- Barnum
- But Never Jam Today
- Censored Scenes from King Kong
- Comin' Uptown
- A Day in Hollywood / A Night in the Ukraine
- Evita
- Got Tu Go Disco
- Happy New Year
- King of Schnorrers
- A Kurt Weill Cabaret
- The Madwoman of Central Park West
- Musical Chairs
- The 1940's Radio Hour
- Reggae
- Sugar Babies

Play revivals

- Filumena
- Major Barbara
- Morning's at Seven
- The Price
- Richard III
- Watch on the Rhine

Musical revivals

- Canterbury Tales
- The Most Happy Fella
- Oklahoma!
- Peter Pan
- West Side Story

== The ceremony ==
Presenters: Eve Arden, Carol Channing, Hume Cronyn, Faye Dunaway, Mia Farrow, James Earl Jones, Elia Kazan, Richard Kiley, James MacArthur, Nancy Marchand, Dudley Moore, Anthony Perkins, Gilda Radner, Lynn Redgrave, Tony Roberts, Jessica Tandy, Cicely Tyson, Dick Van Dyke.

Musicals represented:

- A Day in Hollywood / A Night in the Ukraine ("Doin' the Production Code" - Company)
- Barnum ("Come Follow the Band"/"There is a Sucker Born Ev'ry Minute" - Jim Dale and Company)
- Evita ("A New Argentina" - Patti LuPone and Company)
- Oklahoma! ("People Will Say We're In Love" - Joel Higgins and Christine Andreas)
- Peter Pan ("I'm Flying" - Sandy Duncan and children)
- Sugar Babies ("A McHugh Medley" - Ann Miller and Mickey Rooney)
- West Side Story ("America" - Debbie Allen and Company)

== Winners and nominees ==
Winners are in bold

Best Play	Best Musical
**Children of a Lesser God – Mark Medoff**; Bent – Martin Sherman; Home – Samm-Art Williams; Talley's Folly – Lanford Wilson	**Evita**; A Day in Hollywood / A Night in the Ukraine; Barnum; Sugar Babies
Best Revival	Best Book of a Musical
**Morning's at Seven**; Major Barbara; Peter Pan; West Side Story	**Tim Rice – Evita**; Dick Vosburgh – A Day in Hollywood / A Night in the Ukraine; Mark Bramble – Barnum; Ralph G. Allen and Harry Rigby – Sugar Babies
Best Performance by a Leading Actor in a Play	Best Performance by a Leading Actress in a Play
**John Rubinstein – Children of a Lesser God as James Leeds**; Charles Brown – Home as Cephus Miles; Gerald Hiken – Strider as Strider; Judd Hirsch – Talley's Folly as Matt Friedman	**Phyllis Frelich – Children of a Lesser God as Sarah Norman**; Blythe Danner – Betrayal as Emma; Maggie Smith – Night and Day as Ruth Carson; Anne Twomey – Nuts as Claudia Draper
Best Performance by a Leading Actor in a Musical	Best Performance by a Leading Actress in a Musical
**Jim Dale – Barnum as P. T. Barnum**; Gregory Hines – Comin' Uptown as Scrooge; Mickey Rooney – Sugar Babies as Mickey; Giorgio Tozzi – The Most Happy Fella as Tony	**Patti LuPone – Evita as Eva Perón**; Christine Andreas – Oklahoma! as Laurey Williams; Sandy Duncan – Peter Pan as Peter Pan; Ann Miller – Sugar Babies as Ann
Best Performance by a Featured Actor in a Play	Best Performance by a Featured Actress in a Play
**David Rounds – Morning's at Seven as Homer Bolton**; David Dukes – Bent as Horst; George Hearn – Watch on the Rhine as Kurt Muller; Earle Hyman – The Lady from Dubuque as Oscar; Joseph Maher – Night and Day as Geoffrey Carson	**Dinah Manoff – I Ought to Be in Pictures as Libby Tucker**; Maureen Anderman – The Lady from Dubuque as Carol; Pamela Burrell – Strider as Various Characters; Lois de Banzie – Morning's at Seven as Myrtle Brown
Best Performance by a Featured Actor in a Musical	Best Performance by a Featured Actress in a Musical
**Mandy Patinkin – Evita as Che**; David Garrison – A Day in Hollywood / A Night in the Ukraine as Serge B. Samovar; Harry Groener – Oklahoma! as Will Parker; Bob Gunton – Evita as Juan Perón	**Priscilla Lopez – A Day in Hollywood / A Night in the Ukraine as Gino/Usherette**; Debbie Allen – West Side Story as Anita; Glenn Close – Barnum as Charity 'Chairy' Barnum; Josie de Guzman – West Side Story as Maria
Best Original Score (Music and/or Lyrics) Written for the Theatre	Best Choreography
**Evita – Andrew Lloyd Webber (music) and Tim Rice (lyrics)**; A Day in Hollywood / A Night in the Ukraine – Frank Lazarus(music) and Dick Vosburgh (lyrics); Barnum – Cy Coleman (music) and Michael Stewart (lyrics); Sugar Babies – Arthur Malvin (music and lyrics)	**Tommy Tune and Thommie Walsh – A Day in Hollywood / A Night in the Ukraine**; Ernest Flatt – Sugar Babies; Larry Fuller – Evita; Joe Layton – Barnum
Best Direction of a Play	Best Direction of a Musical
**Vivian Matalon – Morning's at Seven**; Gordon Davidson – Children of a Lesser God; Peter Hall – Betrayal; Marshall W. Mason – Talley's Folly	**Harold Prince – Evita**; Ernest Flatt and Rudy Tronto – Sugar Babies; Joe Layton – Barnum; Tommy Tune – A Day in Hollywood / A Night in the Ukraine
Best Scenic Design	Best Costume Design
**John Lee Beatty – Talley's Folly**; **David Mitchell – Barnum**; Timothy O'Brien and Tazeena Firth – Evita; Tony Walton – A Day in Hollywood / A Night in the Ukraine	**Theoni V. Aldredge – Barnum**; Pierre Balmain – Happy New Year; Timothy O'Brien and Tazeena Firth – Evita; Raoul Pene Du Bois – Sugar Babies
Best Lighting Design
**David Hersey – Evita**; Beverly Emmons – A Day in Hollywood / A Night in the Ukraine; Craig Miller – Barnum; Dennis Parichy – Talley's Folly

== Special awards ==
- Lawrence Langner Memorial Award for Distinguished Lifetime Achievement in the American Theatre — Helen Hayes
- Regional Theatre Award Winner - Actors Theatre of Louisville, Kentucky
- Mary Tyler Moore, Whose Life Is It Anyway?.

=== Multiple nominations and awards ===
These productions had multiple nominations:

- 11 nominations: Evita
- 10 nominations: Barnum
- 9 nominations: A Day in Hollywood / A Night in the Ukraine
- 8 nominations: Sugar Babies
- 5 nominations: Talley's Folly
- 4 nominations: Children of a Lesser God and Morning's at Seven
- 3 nominations: West Side Story
- 2 nominations: Bent, Betrayal, Home, The Lady from Dubuque, Night and Day, Oklahoma!, Peter Pan and Strider

The following productions received multiple awards.

- 7 wins: Evita
- 3 wins: Barnum, Children of a Lesser God and Morning's at Seven
- 2 wins: A Day in Hollywood / A Night in the Ukraine

== See also ==
- Drama Desk Awards
- 1980 Laurence Olivier Awards – equivalent awards for West End theatre productions
- Obie Award
- New York Drama Critics' Circle
- Theatre World Award
- Lucille Lortel Awards
