= Vinie Daly =

American singer

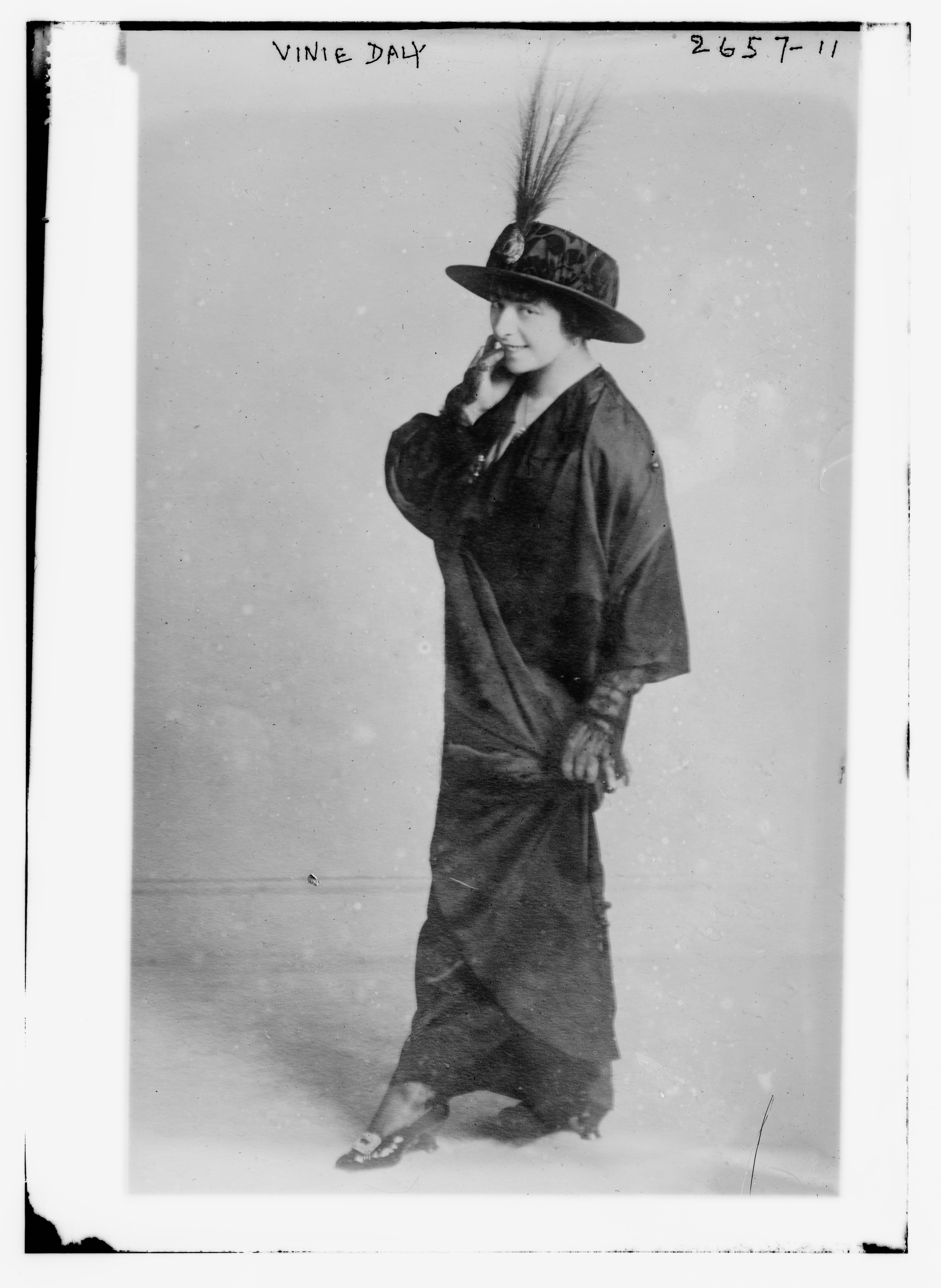
- Daly in the 1910s
- Born: Elvira Elizabeth Delahanty or Alvira Elizabeth Buckley; January 25, 1883; Boston, Massachusetts, U.S.
- Died: December 1942 (aged 59); New Orleans, Louisiana, U.S.
- Other names: Elvira D. Kohl, Vera Vindall, Mme. Vinidali, Vinnie Daly
- Occupations: Singer, actress, dancer, vaudeville performer
- Relatives: Dan Daly (uncle); Harry Vokes (uncle); Hap Ward (uncle)

Vinie Daly (January 25, 1883 – December 1942) was an American singer, dancer, and actress, born Elvira Elizabeth Delahanty or Alvira Elizabeth Buckley. She also used the stage names Vera Vindall and Mme. Vinidali, and was known as Elvira D. Kohl in private life.

== Early life and education ==
Daly was born in Boston, Massachusetts. Her father, known as "Billy Buckley", was "an exceedingly clever black-face comedian" who died in 1894. Her mother was an actress and dancer, known as "Lizzie Daly". They were part of the Daly theatrical family that included Margaret Daly Vokes, Harry Vokes, Hap Ward, and Dan Daly.

== Career ==
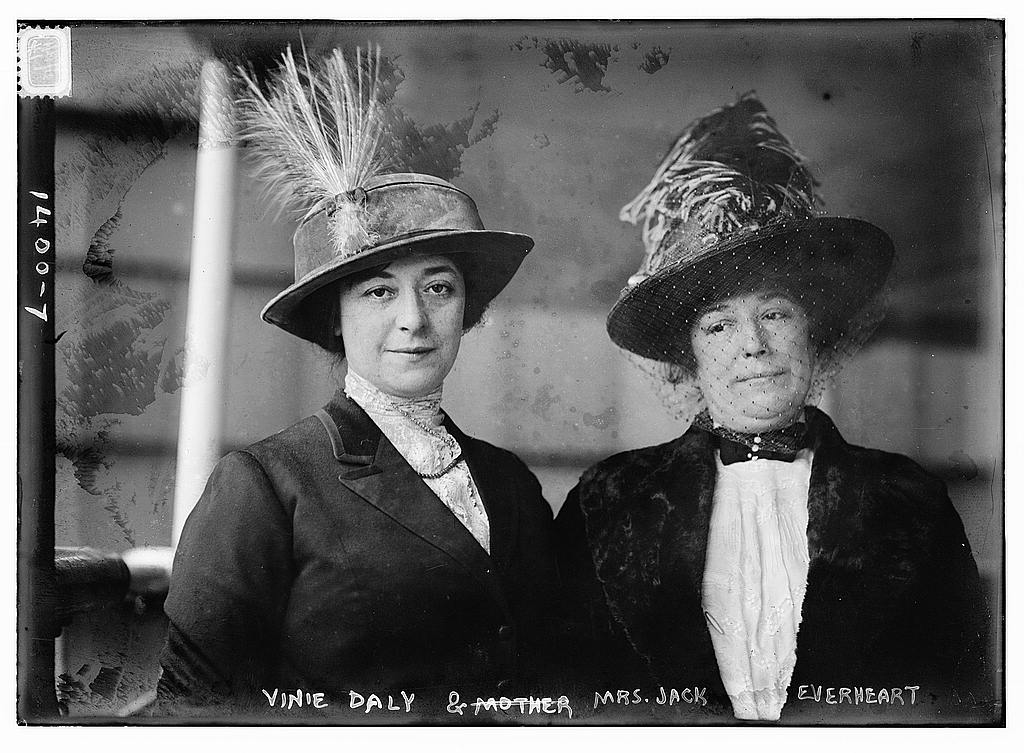
Vinie Daly and Mrs. Jack Everheart LCCN2014687702

Vinie Daly was on the stage from early childhood, and toured in Europe with her mother. She was seen in Broadway in the shows A Pair of Pinks (1904), The Southerners (1904), Piff! Paff! Pouf! (1904–1905), The Rollicking Girl (1906), and George Washington Jr. (1907). In the 1910s she moved into the opera field, trained in Europe, and used the stage names Vera Vindall and Mme. Vinidali. She made a recording of "'O sole mio" in 1924, with Leroy Shield providing piano accompaniment. She continued performing as a singer into the 1930s.

== Personal life ==
Daly married John Peter Kohl in 1909, but he was 20, legally a minor at the time of their marriage, and the marriage was annulled by the court before year's end. They remarried in 1913. She died in 1942, at the age of 59, in New Orleans, Louisiana. There is a Vinie Daly clippings file at the Museum of Performance & Design in San Francisco.
