= Flywheel, Shyster, and Flywheel (1990 radio series) =

- Other names: The Marx Brothers' Flywheel, Shyster and Flywheel
- Genre: Situation comedy
- Running time: 30 minutes
- Country of origin: United Kingdom
- Language: English
- Home station: BBC Radio 4
- Syndicates: BBC Radio 4 Extra
- Starring: Michael Roberts; Frank Lazarus; Lorelei King; Graham Hoadly; Vincent Marzello
- Created by: Nat Perrin; Arthur Sheekman
- Written by: Mark Brisenden
- Directed by: Dirk Maggs
- Produced by: Dirk Maggs
- Recording studio: Paris Theatre, London
- Original release: 2 June 1990 – 22 August 1992
- No. of series: 3
- No. of episodes: 18
- Audio format: Stereo
- Website: Official website

Flywheel, Shyster, and Flywheel is a BBC Radio 4 1990 situation comedy radio show, adapted from a 1932 American radio show of the same name. The original series starred two of the Marx Brothers, Groucho and Chico, and was written primarily by Nat Perrin and Arthur Sheekman. It depicted the misadventures of a small law firm, with Groucho acting as attorney Waldorf T. Flywheel, and Chico playing Flywheel's assistant Emmanuel Ravelli. In 1988 the show scripts were rediscovered in the US Library of Congress, and were adapted by the BBC two years later. The lead roles are performed by professional Marx Brothers soundalikes: Michael Roberts as Groucho's Flywheel and Frank Lazarus as Chico's Ravelli. Other cast members include Lorelei King playing all the female roles, Graham Hoadly as the Announcer and roles in every episode, Vincent Marzello (Lorelei's husband), Spike Milligan and Dick Vosburgh guest starring. During the recording sessions, on occasion Michael Roberts (as Groucho) would adlib certain comments and these were left in the final recordings.

The scripts for the 1990 series were adapted by Mark Brisenden for a modern British audience, and the performances were directed by Dirk Maggs. Rather than each episode being a direct remake of an individual American episode, the 1990 episodes often included material from two or even three different 1932 episodes, and occasionally with additional jokes from Marx Brothers' films. The success of the first series led to another two series being produced.

== Episode list ==
Series	Episode	Title	First broadcast	Based on 1930s episodes
1	1	The Stolen Rembrandt in which Flywheel and Ravelli investigate a Crime	2 June 1990	1, 4 and 17 with material common to Animal Crackers
1	2	Flywheel and Juliet in which Flywheel treads the Boards	9 June 1990	14, with Lydia from At the Circus
1	3	Big Joe Crookley in which Ravelli is kidnapped	16 June 1990	1 and 12, with song from Horse Feathers
1	4	Finding Foo Foo in which Flywheel and Ravelli become dog catchers	23 June 1990	3 and 9
1	5	One Round Gombatz in which Ravelli takes it on the chin	30 June 1990	10 with song from Cocoanuts
1	6	The Election in which Flywheel and Ravelli fix some votes	7 July 1990	5, 6 and 16 with song from Horse Feathers
2	1	Dr. Hackenbush in which Flywheel becomes a medical man	11 May 1991	7
2	2	Uncle Abner in which Flywheel nearly buys the farm	18 May 1991	13
2	3	Convict Ravelli in which Ravelli falls foul of the Law	25 May 1991	6
2	4	The Big Store in which Flywheel runs a department store	1 June 1991	15
2	5	Captain John Smith in which Flywheel and Ravelli find an old geezer	8 June 1991	3
2	6	Going Hollywood in which Flywheel and Ravelli go into pictures	15 June 1991	25
3	1	Crexton Mansion in which Flywheel and Ravelli have a sleep over with a ghost	11 July 1992	24
3	2	The Laughing Hyena in which Flywheel and Ravelli go prospecting	18 July 1992	11 and new material
3	3	Fly by Wheel Tours in which Flywheel and Ravelli inherit a bus	25 July 1992	20
3	4	The Chicago Clarion in which Flywheel and Ravelli get a scoop	1 August 1992	22
3	5	Coney Island in which Flywheel and Ravelli join the carnival	8 August 1992	18
3	6	Miracle on Eatwell Street in which Flywheel and Ravelli cook up a Christmas	15 August 1992	5

== Sources ==
- Barson, Michael, ed. (1988). Flywheel, Shyster, and Flywheel: The Marx Brothers' Lost Radio Show. New York: Pantheon Books. ISBN 0-679-72036-7 – via Internet Archive.
