= Five-Star Theater =

Five-Star Theater (also written as 5-Star Theater) is an American radio series that premiered on Monday, November 28, 1932, on NBC's Blue Network, sponsored by the Standard Oil Companies of New Jersey, Pennsylvania and Louisiana and the Colonial Beacon Oil Company. It was broadcast every weeknight at 7:30 p.m., but with a different program of comedy, music or drama each night. The series ran through May 22, 1933.

Beagle, Shyster, and Beagle was a Monday night comedy program with Groucho Marx as attorney Waldorf T. Beagle and Chico Marx as his assistant Emanuel Ravelli. For the first three episodes, the series was called Beagle, Shyster, and Beagle; however, a lawyer from New York called Beagle contacted NBC and threatened them with a lawsuit. It was then retitled Flywheel, Shyster, and Flywheel. The series depicted the misadventures of a small law firm, with Groucho playing attorney Waldorf T. Flywheel, and Chico playing Emmanuel Ravelli, a character lifted directly from the 1930 film Animal Crackers.

The 1980 discovery of scripts for this 1932–33 series led to publication by Pantheon Books, as described in The New York Times in 1988:

Now, one of the funniest "lost" radio shows of the early 1930s — Flywheel, Shyster and Flywheel, Attorneys at Law, starring Groucho and Chico Marx — has been unearthed. Not the voices; in those years radio programs were not regularly recorded. But the transcripts of 25 of the original Flywheel episodes have been found in the archives of the Library of Congress. For viewers and listeners who want to discover — or rediscover — what comedy was all about in those more slaphappy days, the actual scripts of Flywheel, Shyster and Flywheel, edited by Michael Barson, will be published in October by Pantheon Books. It happened that in 1980, as part of his Ph.D. studies, Mr. Barson worked as a specialist in the Deposit Collection of the Library of Congress (which oversees the Copyright Office). In a section called "unpublished dramas", he came across the Flywheel scripts. Nobody was aware that they still existed; their copyrights had not been renewed. Flywheel had fallen into the public domain.

After the rediscovery of the Marx scripts, many of them were adapted by the BBC, new recordings made with contemporary actors, broadcast on Radio 4 in 1990-1992.

The Josef Bonime Orchestra aired on Tuesdays, with baritone John Charles Thomas.

Wednesday night showcased a dramatic anthology, The Esso Theater.

Opera was featured on Thursday night with the Aborn Opera Company.

On Friday evenings, a radio drama based on the Charlie Chan film franchise was heard, with a cast that included Ray Collins.
