= Dan Daly (comedian) =

American actor and comedian

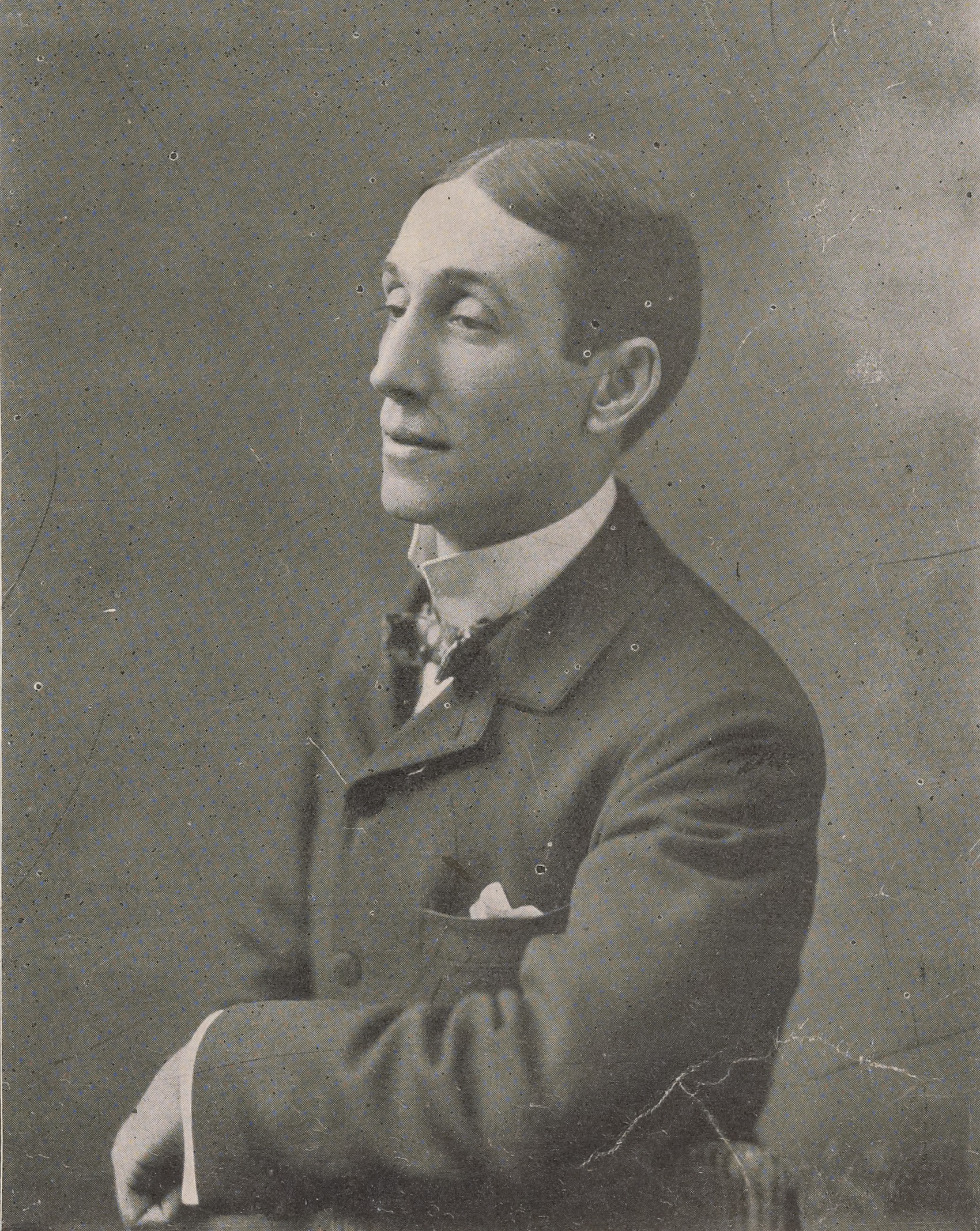
- Daly c. 1901
- Born: c 1854; Revere, Massachusetts, U.S.
- Died: March 26, 1904 (age 40)
- Resting place: Holy Cross Cemetery; Malden, Massachusetts
- Occupations: Actor, Comedian
- Relatives: Harry Vokes (brother-in-law); Hap Ward (brother-in-law); Vinie Daly (niece)

Dan Daly (c. 1854 – March 26, 1904) was an American actor known as the "eccentric comedian". He was born in 1854 in Revere, Massachusetts, the fifth child in a family of eight children.

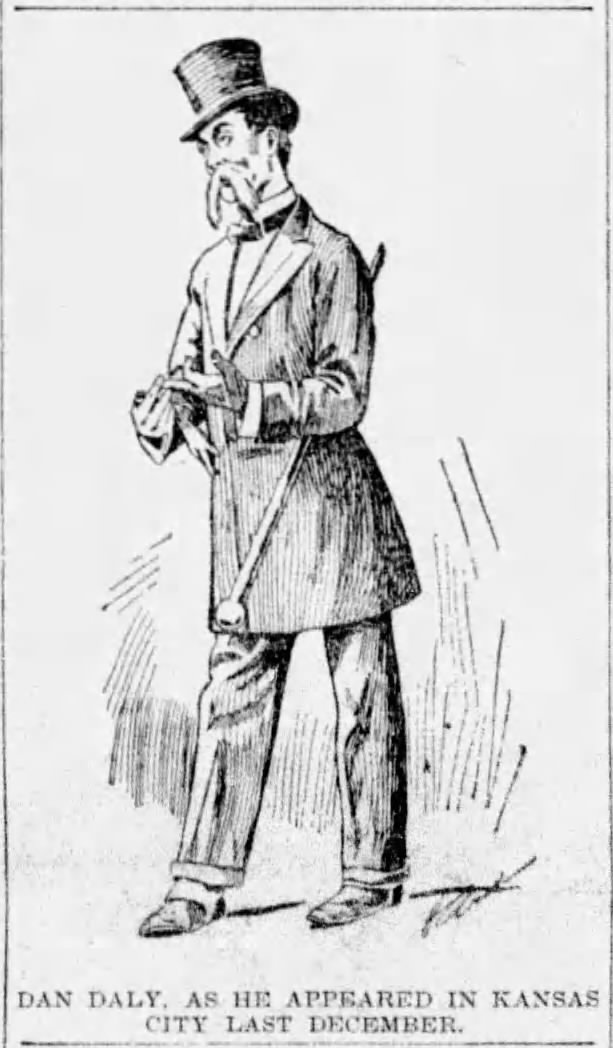
Daly as he appeared in Kansas City circa December 1896

== Career ==
In 1896 he appeared in The Lady Slavey in New York co-starring Marie Dressler. In 1901 he appeared with Edna May in The Girl From Up There, and starred opposite Virginia Earle in The New Yorkers. He also appeared in The Belle of New York, The Rounders, The New Clown and in John Henry.

Daly worked in a manner peculiarly his own. He had a nasal drawl that was the funniest thing Broadway had ever listened to. He never smiled. He vocalized, but it wasn't singing. It was just a Dalyization of a lyric. He was surprisingly nimble and graceful, and his acrobatic feats were at once a marvel to the audience and a source of fear to the company. He would be seen one minute on the stage, and the next the audience would see him gesticulating in an upper box, from which he would descend to the stage with the agility of a monkey. He threw himself around without regard to consequences and once a fall laid him up for several weeks. Also, he insisted that the others in the company should be equally energetic and fearless of hurt. Once he dragged the young woman who was playing "opposite" him through a property window with such violence that her knee cap was fractured.

== Personal life and death ==
Daly was the fifth of a family of eight children. His father was a laboring man and had no fancy for the stage, but of his seven brothers and sisters, all but one had more or less successful stage careers. Daly's first appearance was with his brother, Robert, the two appearing as sketch artists and song and dance comedians in a number of theaters in the east, when they were still mere children. Later all the brothers and sisters took part in two successful farce comedies, Vacation and Upside Down. Then Daly struck out for himself, and it was as a leading comedian that he was best known.

Daly had contracted tuberculosis, and died on March 26, 1904, at the age of 40, from a pulmonary hemorrhage at the Hotel Vendome in Manhattan. He married Mary Mooney of Boston, and they had a son, Robert Daly. Mary died on March 13, 1904.

According to fellow comedian Eddie Foy Sr., Daly subsisted on a diet of snails and champagne for the last two years of his life:

One of the millions of mysterious happenings in the history of human psychology is that strange mental twist which seized upon Dan not so long after this and caused him to subsist during the last two years of his life entirely on snails. This was common gossip at the time, and George Rector, who furnished the snails, has since confirmed it. Dan ate nothing at all during the day, but after the show, along towards midnight, he would go up to Rector's and absorb about a quart of snails and a quart of champagne. How he lived as long as he did on such a diet I can't imagine.

== See also ==
- Broadway theatre
- Vaudeville
