= Absence makes the heart grow fonder =

Absence makes the heart grow fonder may refer to:

- "Absence makes the heart grow fonder", a proverbial phrase
- "Absence makes the heart grow fonder", a 1900 popular song by composer Herbert Dillea
