= 24 Hours in London =

- Every second kills.
- Directed by: Alexander Finbow
- Written by: Alexander Finbow
- Produced by: Fergal McGrath
- Starring: Gary Olsen; Anjela Lauren Smith
- Cinematography: Chris Plevin
- Edited by: Ian Farr
- Music by: Edmund Butt
- Distributed by: Blue Dolphin Film Distribution (UK); Blockbuster Entertainment Group (US)
- Release date: 14 July 2000
- Running time: 90 min.
- Country: United Kingdom
- Language: English / French / Russian

24 Hours in London is a 2000 British crime thriller film directed by Alexander Finbow and starring Gary Olsen and Anjela Lauren Smith. The film takes place in London in the year 2009.

== Plot ==
Crime lord Christian controls the streets of London. He decides to exterminate a rival gang but leaves a witness in the process. Martha, the witness, is being protected by the police but Christian's gang is unstoppable. After her near-death experience in the police station, she is moved to another location to meet up with undercover officers, but the officer she meets is actually a criminal impersonating the officer that he and his accomplice have just harvested organs from.

At the end, as Christian is dying in a hotel room, we learn that the protagonist is actually a mole for Christian and that one of Christian's thugs is romantically involved with Martha. It turns out that Martha and her lover Tony hired the organ harvesters who are caught up in the middle, Christian is dead, the good/bad cop is left to die, and the organ harvesters and the con couple (Martha and Tony) leave. After their departure, the police force enters the room and the commissioner gives a nod signaling them to leave.

== Cast ==
- Gary Olsen as Christian
- Tony London as Leon
- David Sonnethal as Bubbles Healy
- Sara Stockbridge as Simone
- Luke Garrett as Richard
- Wendy Cooper as Antonia
- Anjela Lauren Smith as Martha
- John Sharian as Tony
- Lorelei King as Lloyd
- Sean Francis as Samuel
- Katia Caballero as Michelle
- Richard Graham as Novell
- Morgan Jones as Sean
- Jeremy Beckman as Floyd
- Olegario Fedoro as Mobster Koloshnakov
- Richard Dempsey as Olly Walsh
