= We Have Ways of Making You Laugh =

- title screen with host Frank Muir
- Genre: Comedy
- Directed by: Bill Turner
- Presented by: Frank Muir
- Country of origin: United Kingdom
- No. of episodes: 12 (all unaired)

Production
- Producer: Humphrey Barclay
- Production company: London Weekend Television

Original release
- Network: ITV
- Release: 2 August 1968

We Have Ways of Making You Laugh is a comedy television series produced by Humphrey Barclay and directed by Bill Turner for London Weekend Television. Frank Muir hosted the show. It featured Kenneth Cope, Eric Idle and Katherine Whitehorn, with music and writing by Benny Green. The theme music was composed by Don Partridge and played in his 'one-man-band' style. Dick Vosburgh prepared material spoofing Jimmy Young for the show. Terry Gilliam created animations using cut-outs, a technique he later used in Monty Python's Flying Circus. The series was live. Its debut broadcast was scheduled for 2 August 1968. Although the cast performed, only the first 15 seconds of the first show were transmitted, due to an industrial action (other, prerecorded programming was unaffected by the labour dispute). There are no known recordings of its 12 episodes.
