= The Floor Walkers =

1899 road musical

The Floor Walkers was a road musical that was created as a starring vehicle for the comedy duo of Hap Ward and Harry Vokes to feature their signature roles of the tramps Lord Percy Harden (portrayed by Ward) and Lord Harold Poorly (portrayed by Vokes); characters the duo had previously portrayed in the earlier musicals A Run On the Bank (1895) and The Governors (1898). The Floor Walkers had no attributed author for its book or lyrics, but the music for the production was created by composer Herbert Dillea who also served as the musical's music director. The most well known song from the show was "Absence Makes the Heart Grow Fonder"; which was the only song to have an attributed lyricist, Arthur Gillespie. This song was for a time a popular standard and was recorded multiple times by singer Harry Macdonough and cornetist Jules Levy for records made for the Victor Talking Machine Company and Columbia Records from 1902 through 1905, and later was recorded by Wayne King in 1947.

The Floor Walkers premiered at the Great Northern Theatre in Chicago on May 16, 1899. The Detroit publisher and theatre lawyer and manager Edward Douglas Stair was the producer of the show. It was originally written in three acts and each act presented a separate story that was only unified through the continuation of Ward and Vokes characters through each scenario. These acts were: "The-Three-Must-Get-Theres", "Sporting Life", and "The Floor Walkers". After leaving Chicago, The Floor Walkers went through several modifications, and by the time the production reached Broadway it was now only in two acts. The work had its New York debut at Broadway's Grand Opera House on January 29, 1900, where it ran for a single week before continuing on its national tour. Well received by New York audiences, the show later returned to the Grand Opera House for another week of performances in January 1901 before continuing to tour elsewhere. The show continued to tour the United States until another Ward and Vokes musical premiered later in 1901; The Head Waiters.
