= Lorelei King =

Actress, screenwriter and development executive

Lorelei King is an American actress, screenwriter and development executive who has been based in the United Kingdom since 1981. She has narrated audiobooks, acted in radio plays for BBC Radio 4 and appeared on television.

== Early life ==
King was born in Pennsylvania. She spent her childhood moving between Pennsylvania, Arkansas, and California. In 1981, she planned to move to either Paris or Yugoslavia, where her family originated, but after a three-day stopover in London, she decided to stay in Britain.

== Career ==
King has made numerous television roles, which include drama, comedy and children's shows. Her first appearance was in the drama Murrow (1983), a biography of the American news reporter and political commentator Edward R. Murrow and since then she has had roles in many British shows, such as Series 2 on the Sky One show, Mile High as Fresh! airlines HR boss, Stella Lightfoot, Chef! (as Savanna), Linda Milson in ‘’Rumpole of the Bailey’’ in 1991 and in the ITV soap opera Emmerdale as showgirl Vonda Lockhart. As well as this, she has also had parts in films such as Shining Through (1992), Notting Hill (1999), 24 Hours in London (2000) and The House of Mirth (2000), as well lending her voice to radio shows and video games. This includes Dirk Maggs' adaptations of The Adventures of Superman and Batman: Knightfall. She voiced the character of Mary Osakwe in the UFO: Afterlight computer game. More recently, she provided voices to small parts in the video games Mass Effect: Andromeda (2017), Subnautica (2018) and its sequel Subnautica: Below Zero (2021). In 2006, she appeared in an episode of sitcom Not Going Out as a therapist. She has narrated over 400 audiobooks. King also provided the voice of Samus Aran's Power Suit in a 2005 pinball video game, Metroid Prime Pinball. In 2017 she portrayed the voice of MUTHUR, the eponymous spaceship's computer in Alien: Covenant.

King's work also includes:

- Voicing several female characters (excluding Bella) in Avenger Penguins; Jane, Dominique, Catherine in Space Adventure Cobra, Tabs and Marmagora in Fantomcat; and Wendy in the American version of Bob the Builder.
- Narrating all audiobooks of the Irish children's cartoon series Dino Babies, as well as books by Janet Evanovich, Darynda Jones, Patricia Briggs, Patricia Cornwell, and Debbie Macomber. In addition to numerous Audiofile Earphone and Audie Awards, she was voted Performer of the Year in 1999 and 2001 by the United Kingdom APA and Best Narrator of the Year by Audible.com in 2011.
- Playing all the female roles in Flywheel, Shyster, and Flywheel, that was adapted in the 1990s for BBC Radio 4 from the original Marx Brothers radio series broadcast in the 1930s. Her husband also appeared in the series.
- Voice directing the CGI animated series Chuggington and in the video game Gray Matter.
- Writing scripts for Chuggington, Fantomcat, Big Mutha Truckers and Cartoon Network Racing as well rewriting some of the original scripts for Bob the Builder.

== Personal life ==
King lived in London with her husband, actor Vincent Marzello, until his death on 31 March 2020. She is a British citizen.

== Partial filmography ==
- Murrow (TV – 1986) as Waitress
- Devilman (OVA Dub – 1987) as Dancer/Walla
- Angel Cop (OVA Dub – 1989) as Lucifer
- Shining Through (1992) as Leland's New Secretary
- Thumpkin and the Easter Bunnies (1992)
- Intimate with a Stranger (1995) as Ellen
- Chef! (TV – 1996) as Savanna
- The Saint (1997) as TV Reporter
- Painted Lady (TV-Mini – 1997) as Margot
- Martha, Meet Frank, Daniel and Laurence aka The Very Thought of You (1998) as U.S. Ground Stewardess
- Heart of Darkness (1998) as Mother
- Notting Hill (1999) as Anna's Publicist
- 24 Hours in London (2000) as Lloyd
- The House of Mirth (2000) as Mrs. Hatch
- Surrealismo: The Scandalous Success of Salvador Dali (TV – 2002) as Caresse Crosby
- The Falklands Play (TV – 2002) as Jeane Kirkpatrick
- Bob the Builder: A Christmas to Remember (2001) as Wendy, The Mayor, Mrs. Potts, Doris Ellis and Mrs. Broadbent (US)
- Bob the Builder: The Knights of Fix-A-Lot (2003) as Wendy, Mrs. Potts, Mrs. Bentley, Mrs. Percival, Dorothy, Dr. Florence Mountfitchet and The Librarian (US)
- Second Nature (TV – 2003) as Nancy Reed
- Bob the Builder: LIVE! (2004) as Wendy
- Bob the Builder: Snowed Under: The Bobblesberg Winter Games (2004) Wendy (US)
- Suzie Gold (2004) as Meditation Teacher
- Boo, Zino & the Snurks aka Back to Gaya (2004) as Female Gayan
- Jonathan Creek (S4E4) (2004) as Geraldine Vaccaro
- Bob the Builder: Bob's Big Plan (TV – 2005) as Wendy, Mrs. Potts and The Mayor (US)
- Bob the Builder: When Bob Became a Builder (2006) as Wendy, Mrs. Potts (US)
- Bob the Builder: Built to be Wild (2006) as Wendy (US)
- Stan (TV – 2006) as Lucille
- Bob the Builder: Scrambler to the Rescue (2007) as Wendy, Roley, Mrs. Bentley, Dorothy, Sophia Sabatini, Packer and Vicky Picker (US)
- Bob the Builder: Race to the Finish (2009) as Wendy, Roley, Mrs. Barbara Bentley, Packer & Vicky Picker (US)
- Alien: Covenant (2017) as Voice of Mother
- Avenger Penguins as various characters
- Subnautica as Marguerit Maida / Lifepod 6 Crew (voice only)
- Subnautica: Below Zero as Marguerit Maida
- Mass Effect: Andromeda as Elonis Atandra and Additional Voices
