= Vincent Marzello =

American actor (1947–2020)

- Born: June 12, 1947; Brooklyn, New York, U.S.
- Died: March 31, 2020 (aged 72); London, England
- Occupation: Actor
- Years active: 1976–2017
- Spouse: Lorelei King

Vincent Marzello (June 12, 1947 – March 31, 2020) was an American actor.

== Early life ==
Marzello trained at the Guildhall School of Music and Drama in London.

== Career ==
Marzello was active on screen from 1976 in North America and Europe, his first role being in an episode of The Brothers. Thereafter he appeared in productions that included The Spy Who Loved Me, Superman, Never Say Never Again, The Witches, Taggart, The House of Eliott, The Fragile Heart, Dalziel and Pascoe, Little Britain, Nuclear Secrets and Mile High. He lent his voice to the character of Fernando Ramirez in the UFO: Afterlight computer game and appeared in the U.K. in radio series Flywheel, Shyster, and Flywheel (with his wife).

In 2006, he played Bob Zelnick in Frost/Nixon in London's West End, starting at the Donmar Warehouse in August and transferring to the Gielgud Theatre that November.

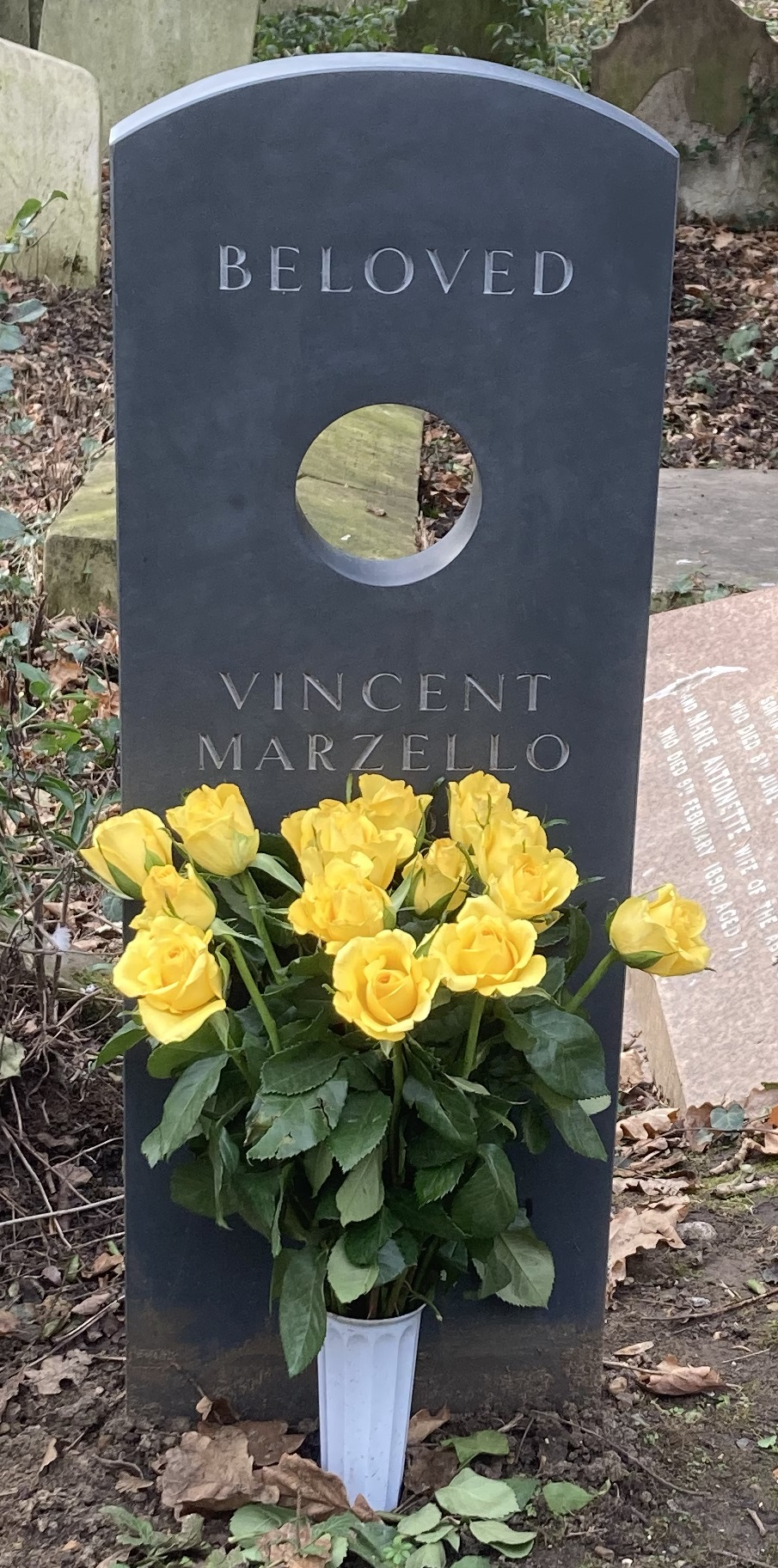
Vincent Marzello's grave, Highgate Cemetery

== Personal life ==
Marzello was married to actress Lorelei King. They lived in London. During successful treatment for cancer in 2009, he was diagnosed with early onset dementia.

Marzello died on March 31, 2020. His ashes are interred in Highgate Cemetery, near fellow actor, Sir Ian Holm.

== Filmography ==
- The Brothers (1976, TV) as Chris Felton
- The Spy Who Loved Me (1977) as USS Wayne Crewman #7
- Superman (1978) as 1st Copy Boy
- Ike (1979, TV) as Mickey McKeogh
- Superman II (1980) as 1st Copy Boy (uncredited)
- Never Say Never Again (1983) as Colonel Culpepper
- Odin: Photon Sailer Starlight (1985) as Cyborg / MC (1992) (English version, voice, uncredited)
- John and Yoko: A Love Story (1985, TV Movie) as Anthony Cox
- Life Story (1987 TV Movie) as Peter Pauling
- The Woman He Loved (1988, TV Movie) as Benny Thaw
- Honor Bound (1988) as Hanley
- Venus Wars (1989) as Barkeep / Mechanic (English version, voice, uncredited)
- The Witches (1990) as Luke's Father
- Taggart (1990, TV) as Enzo Fabrizzi
- A Kid in King Arthur's Court (1995) as Dad
- The Fragile Heart (1996, TV) as Hugh Lyle
- Father Ted (1998, TV) as Television Psychiatrist
- Velvet Goldmine (1998) as US Reporter 1
- Dalziel and Pascoe (1998, TV) as Noah Seger
- Bob the Builder (2000–2016, TV) as Farmer Pickles and Robert (US; voice)
- Mike Bassett: England Manager (2001) as US Newsreader
- Jack and the Beanstalk: The Real Story (2001, TV) as Mr. Sprague
- Laws of Attraction (2004) as Lyman Hersh
- Little Britain (2004, TV) as President
- Mile High (2005, TV) as Jed
- Nuclear Secrets (2007, TV) as McCone
- Chuggington (2008, TV) as Action Chugger Movie Announcer (voice)
- Planet 51 (2009) as Additional Voices
- Just Cause 2 (2010, Video Game) as Tom Sheldon (voice)
