= Beacon Oil =

American oil and gas company

Beacon Oil Company
- Industry: Oil and gas
- Founded: 1919
- Defunct: 1947
- Fate: Acquired by Standard Oil of New Jersey
- Headquarters: Boston, Massachusetts
- Key people: James Lorin Richards
- Parent: Massachusetts Gas Companies (1919–1926); Louisiana Oil Refining Company (1926–1929); Standard Oil of New Jersey (1929–1947)
- Subsidiaries: Colonial Filling Stations

Beacon Oil Company (known as Colonial Beacon from 1930 to 1947) was an American oil and gas corporation headquartered in Boston.

== Early years ==
Beacon Oil was established by the Massachusetts Gas Companies in 1919. The company entered signed a contract to purchase crude oil from the Atlantic Gulf Oil Corporation and began construction on a refinery in Everett, Massachusetts. The refinery began operations in July 1920 the following year and could produce a full line of petroleum products, including gasoline, kerosene, fuel oil, asphalt, lubricating oil, and wax. It had a capacity to run 15,000 barrels a day and store another 950,000 barrels. In 1923 the United States Shipping Board awarded Beacon a contract to supply fuel oil at the Port of Boston. Beacon co-owned the Beacon Sun Oil Company with Sun Oil Co., which owned 55 drilling concessions in Venezuela.

On January 8, 1926, Louisiana Oil Refining Company acquired a controlling interest in Beacon. As a result of the ownership change, Clifford M. Leonard succeeded James Lorin Richards as chairman of the board and Richard B. Kahle succeeded H. L. Wollenberg as president.

== Colonial Filling Stations ==
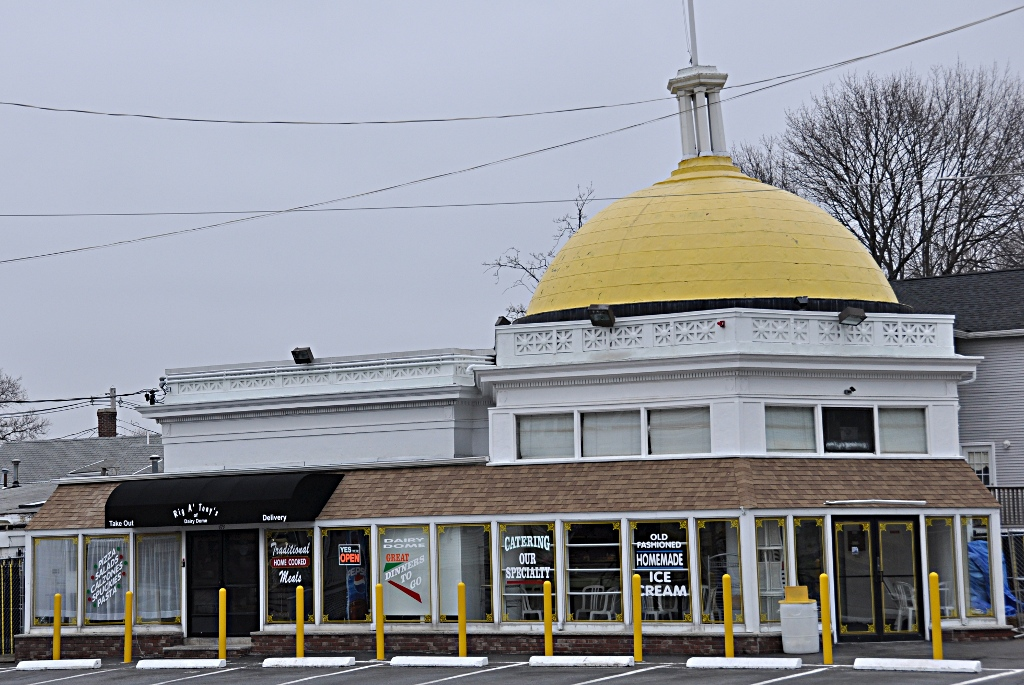
Former Colonial Beacon Gas Station in Stoneham, Massachusetts.

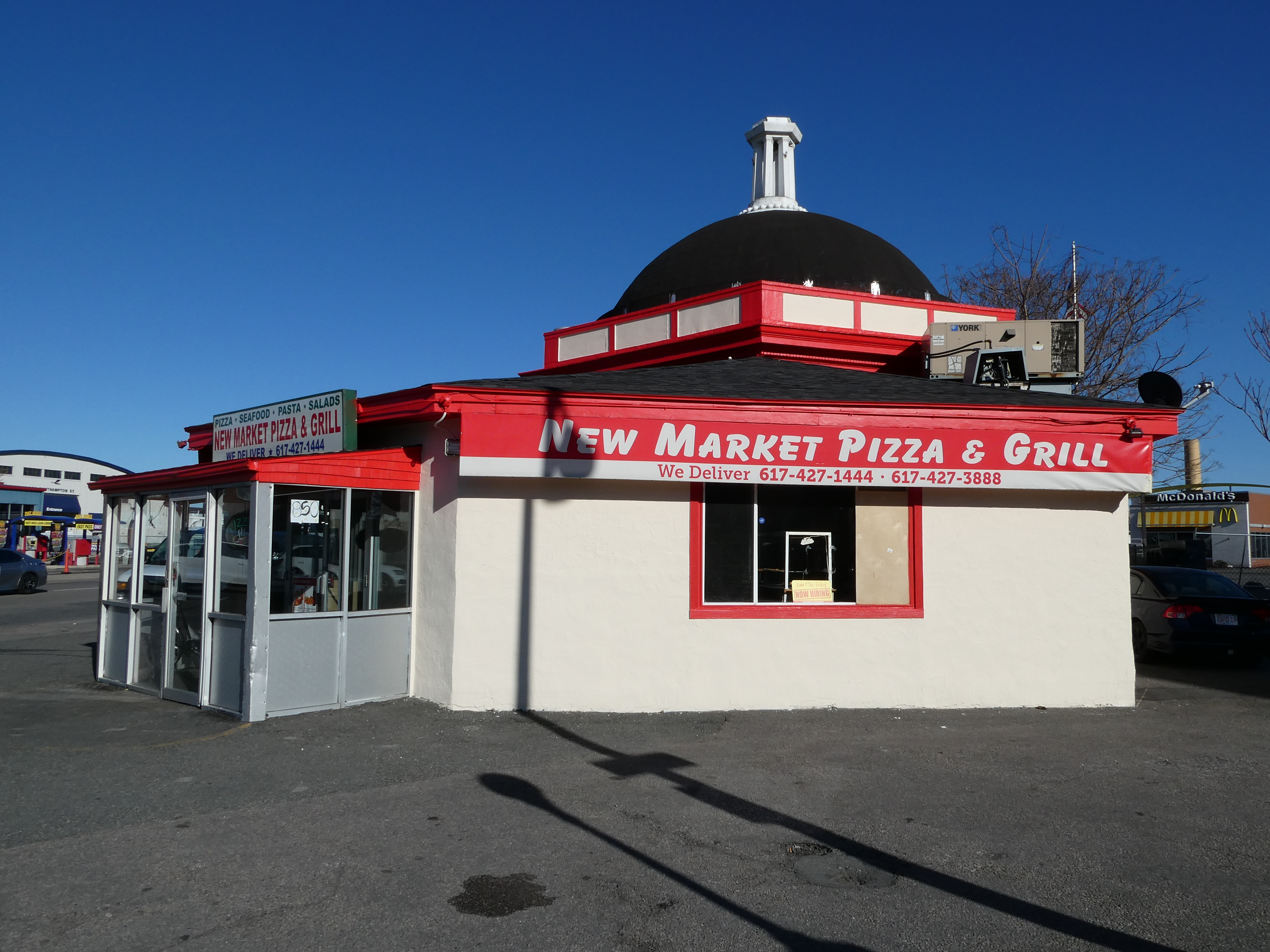
Former Colonial Beacon Gas Station in Boston.

Colonial Filling Stations Inc. was a subsidiary of Beacon Oil that owned gas stations throughout New England (except Vermont) and New York. In 1922, the architecture firm of Coolidge & Carlson was hired to design Colonial's prototype gas station. The prototype, known as the “Watertown”, featuring an all-white exterior, columns, balustrade, and a golden dome, was based on the design of the Massachusetts State House. 35 to 50 “Watertown” stations were built in Greater Boston. In the 1930s, the company began using a lighthouse design for its gas stations in New York.

In 1924, Beacon acquired Dixie Oil Company, which operated gas stations in Connecticut and Springfield, Massachusetts after Dixie defaulted on contractual obligations. By 1925 Beacon owned 160 gas stations. In 1926, Beacon entered the Rhode Island market after it acquired Narragansett Filling Stations Inc., the New York state market after it purchased the gasoline and kerosene business of Pennzoil, and the New York City market after it purchased the Craycroft Oil Company. In 1928, Beacon purchased the gas stations of the Webaco Oil Company of Webster, New York. By 1929 Beacon owned or leased 350 gas stations. In 1931, Beacon acquired the Kesbec chain of 55 gas stations.

== Industrial accidents ==
On April 14, 1922, an explosion at the Everett refinery injured four and killed one. The employee who was killed, Harry Vokes, was a retired vaudeville performer known for being half of Ward and Vokes. That November, 151 Everett residents filed a bill in equity with the Massachusetts Supreme Judicial Court seeking to shut down the plant. The bill was dismissed by the court.

On March 10, 1925, a fire under seven of Beacon's oil tanks required the evacuation of 200 South Everett residents.

On December 10, 1926, an explosion at the Beacon refinery shook buildings in Everett, Medford, and Winchester.

On February 10, 1928, ten of the company's stills exploded, setting fire to over 500,000 gallons of oil. Fourteen Beacon employees were killed as a result of the explosion.

On July 22, 1929, two Beacon employees were injured from a flare up from a high pressure still.

== Acquisition by Standard Oil ==
On January 9, 1929, Leonard announced that Beacon would be acquired by Standard Oil Company of New Jersey. On March 25, 1930, the company's name was changed to Colonial Beacon to more closely identify it with its two brands. That December, president R. B. Kahle was elected vice president of Standard Oil's shipping subsidiary and was succeeded by A. Clarke Bedford. From 1932 to 1933, Colonial Beacon sponsored the NBC Blue Network's Five-Star Theater, which featured the Marx Brothers' Flywheel, Shyster, and Flywheel. In 1935, Colonial Beacon entered the oil burner business by purchasing Arthur H. Ballard Inc. On December 31, 1947, Standard Oil took over the business and assets of Colonial Beacon, but continued to use the Colonial Beacon name for marketing purposes in New England and New York until the 1950s. The Everett refinery was closed down in 1965 as it had become unprofitable.

== Fleet ==
Beacon Oil also operated a fleet of oil tankers to maintain their operations. Each ship was transferred to the Standard Oil Company of New Jersey when the company was acquired.

Data
Name	Year launched	Tonnage
Beaconoil	1919	7,058
Beaconlight	1920	7,072
Beaconstar	1920	7,078
Beacon	1921	10,398
Colonial Beacon	1927	1,224
