= Colonial Beacon Gas Station =

- U.S. National Register of Historic Places
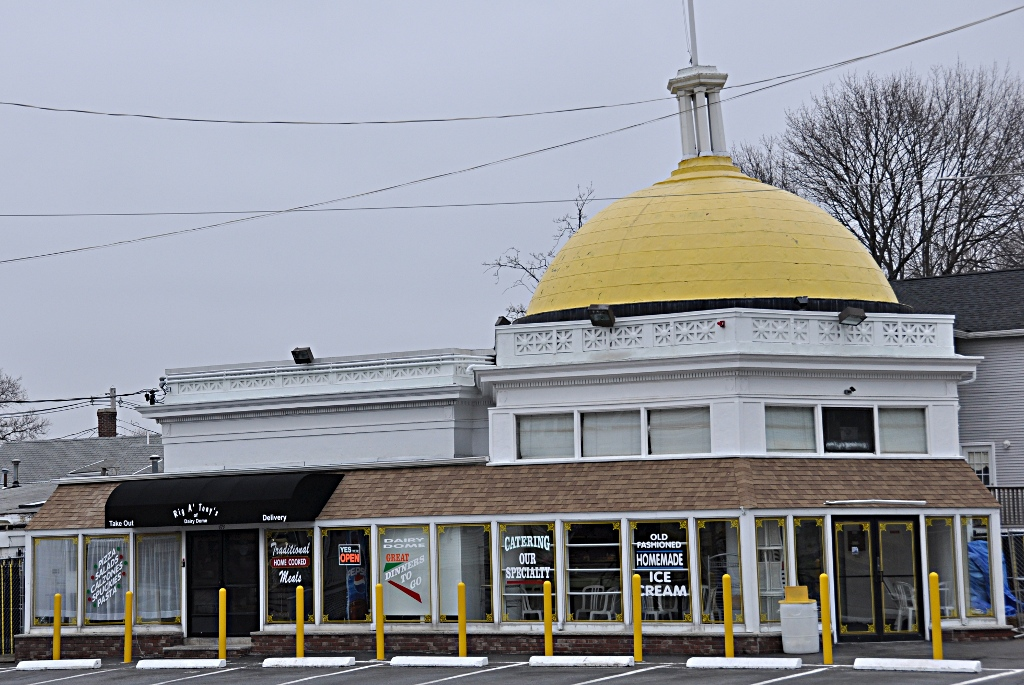

- Location within Massachusetts Location within the United States
- Location: 474 Main St., Stoneham, Massachusetts
- Coordinates: 42.47582°N 71.10054°W
- Built: 1922
- Architect: Coolidge & Carlson
- Architectural style: Classical Revival
- MPS: Stoneham MRA
- NRHP reference No.: 84002554
- Added to NRHP: April 13, 1984

The Colonial Beacon Gas Station was a historic gas station at 474 Main Street in Stoneham, Massachusetts. It was built c. 1922 by the Beacon Oil Company to be a flagship station in their Colonial chain of filling stations. The concrete and stucco building was designed by the Boston firm of Coolidge & Carlson. It had two main sections: an octagonal section that once served as a drive-through filling area, and a rectangular service area to its left. Corinthian columns originally supported the octagonal section; these were later covered over or replaced. The octagonal section was topped by a round dome, at whose apex was a small pillared section that was once topped by a grillwork globe that housed a light. This light, when illuminated, became the beacon which gave the station its name. The service area and pumping bay had a band of starburst panels that ran along the top of the flat roofed service area and around the base of the pumping area dome. The structure was one of about 10 Colonial Oil stations built with a golden dome to resemble the Massachusetts State House on Beacon Hill.

The building served as a filling station until after World War II. Later, it served a variety of retail services, for example as a flower and produce shop in 1984. None of these uses significantly affected the integrity of the building. The pumping bay was enclosed in glass, making it into an integral part of the interior space.

The building was listed on the National Register of Historic Places in 1984, at which time it was one of four surviving Colonial Oil filling stations. It housed an ice cream parlor, Dairy Dome, from the 1980s to the 2010s. The structure was demolished on December 18, 2018, for construction of an apartment building. Three other domed former Colonial Oil stations remain in Woburn, Malden, and Boston.

== See also ==
- National Register of Historic Places listings in Stoneham, Massachusetts
- National Register of Historic Places listings in Middlesex County, Massachusetts
