= Fugitives (1929 film) =

1929 film

- Directed by: William Beaudine
- Written by: Malcolm Stuart Boylan; Rowland Brown; Vernon Smith; John Stone
- Based on: The Exiles, and Other Stories; 1894 novel by Richard Harding Davis
- Produced by: William Fox; Kenneth Hawks (Supv)
- Starring: Madge Bellamy; Don Terry; Arthur Stone; Earle Foxe
- Cinematography: Chester A. Lyons
- Production company: Fox Film Corporation
- Distributed by: Fox Film Corporation
- Release date: January 27, 1929
- Running time: 60 minutes
- Country: United States
- Languages: Sound (Synchronized); English

Fugitives is a 1929 Synchronized sound American pre-Code drama film directed by William Beaudine and starring Madge Bellamy, Don Terry and Arthur Stone. While the film has no audible dialog, it was released with a synchronized musical score with sound effects using the sound-on-film Movietone process. Future stars Jean Harlow and Virginia Bruce both had small parts in the film.

== Plot ==
Alice Carroll, a wholesome chorus girl who lives quietly with her widowed mother, works nights at the nightclub of the predatory proprietor Al Barrow. Barrow has been pressing unwanted attentions upon her, and during a heated quarrel Alice is overheard by another chorine threatening to kill him rather than submit.

That night, Barrow is found dead in his office—shot. Alice, stunned, is discovered nearby, standing over his body with a revolver in her hand. Circumstantial evidence appears overwhelming.

The case falls to young Assistant District Attorney Dick Starr, earnest and ambitious. Convinced by the testimony of the chorus girl who overheard the threat, and by Alice's own damning proximity to the crime scene, Starr secures her conviction for murder. Though he is duty-bound to prosecute, Starr is privately troubled by her sincerity and innocence of manner. Alice is sentenced to prison.

On her way to Sing Sing, Alice is aided by her loyal friend Jimmy, a small-time crook who has long carried a torch for her. With the help of fellow crooks, he stages a daring escape. Alice vanishes into the shadows of New York's underworld, branded a fugitive.

Together with Jimmy, she flees overseas, eventually reaching a rough colonial outpost in Africa, a “refuge town” for criminals in the Orient. This lawless settlement is a haven for fugitives, crooks, and adventurers—a place where extradition is a meaningless word. Here Alice begins a new life, though her name is whispered with suspicion among the expatriate crowd.

Back home, Starr is shaken when later evidence casts doubt on Alice's guilt. The underworld begins to crack from within: rival gangsters quarrel, and one of Barrow's associates, mortally wounded in a police raid, makes a deathbed confession to the nightclub killing.

Stricken with remorse for having prosecuted an innocent woman, Starr makes every effort to secure her pardon. Learning where Alice has fled, he sets out to find her himself.

In the fugitive settlement, Alice is still haunted by her trial and convinced the law had framed her. She distrusts Starr when he appears, suspecting a trap. Yet Starr risks his life to protect her when Barrow's surviving gangster allies, led by Earl Rand and Scal “the Rat”, try to settle old scores. In a vicious attack on the dive where Alice has been hiding, Starr is nearly killed—but Alice fights back, saving his life.

At last, the truth comes out: Barrow's real killer has confessed, Alice is cleared, and Starr convinces her that his intentions are honorable.

With the cloud of suspicion finally lifted, Alice realizes she has fallen in love with the man who once sent her to prison. Starr asks her to return with him. Alice agrees, and the two are reconciled, prepared to leave behind the criminal refuge and begin anew—no longer fugitives, but partners in a redeemed life.

== Cast ==
- Madge Bellamy as Alice Carroll
- Don Terry as Dick Starr
- Arthur Stone as Jimmy
- Earle Foxe as Al Barrow
- Matthew Betz as Earl Rand
- Lumsden Hare as Uncle Ned
- Edith Yorke as Mrs. Carroll
- Hap Ward as Scal (aka "the Rat")

== See also ==
- List of early sound feature films (1926–1929)

== Bibliography ==
- Marshall, Wendy L. William Beaudine: From Silents to Television. Scarecrow Press, 2005.
