= Herbert Dillea =

American composer, songwriter and conductor

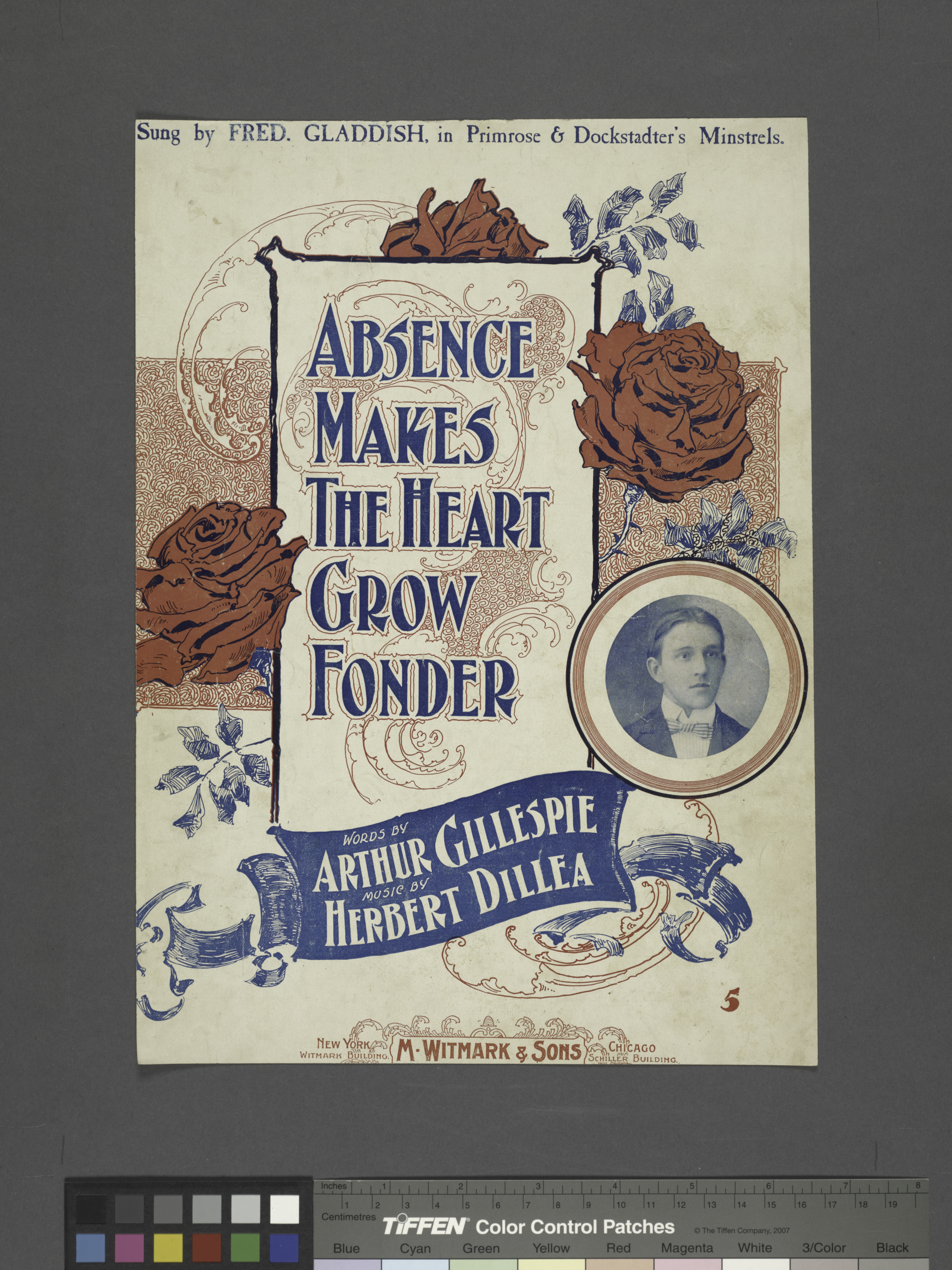
Cover of the sheet music for "Absence makes the heart grow fonder" which was published by M. Witmark & Sons in 1900.

Otho Herbert Dilley, better known by his stage and pen name Herbert Dillea, (December 19, 1870, in Guernsey County, Ohio – April 1, 1909, in Senecaville, Ohio) was an American composer, songwriter, and conductor. He composed the music to three Broadway musicals: The Floor Walkers (1900), The Head Waiters (1902), and My Wife Won't Let Me (1906). As a songwriter, Dilley was best known as the composer to the popular standard "Absence makes the heart grow fonder" (published in 1900; written for The Floor Walkers); a work which was recorded multiple times by singer Harry Macdonough and cornetist Jules Levy for records made for the Victor Talking Machine Company and Columbia Records from 1902 through 1905, and later was recorded by Wayne King in 1947. He was also the composer of the ragtime piece Rag time society which was recorded several times by the Metropolitan Orchestra for Victor in 1901 and 1902.

Dilley served as music director for the Broadway productions of his stage works. He was also active as a theatre conductor in Chicago, and was notably working as the resident director of the Iroquois Theatre's orchestra at the time of the famous 1903 fire at that venue. He died from tuberculosis on April 1, 1909, in Senecaville, Ohio.
