= Harry Vokes =

American comedian and actor (1866–1922)

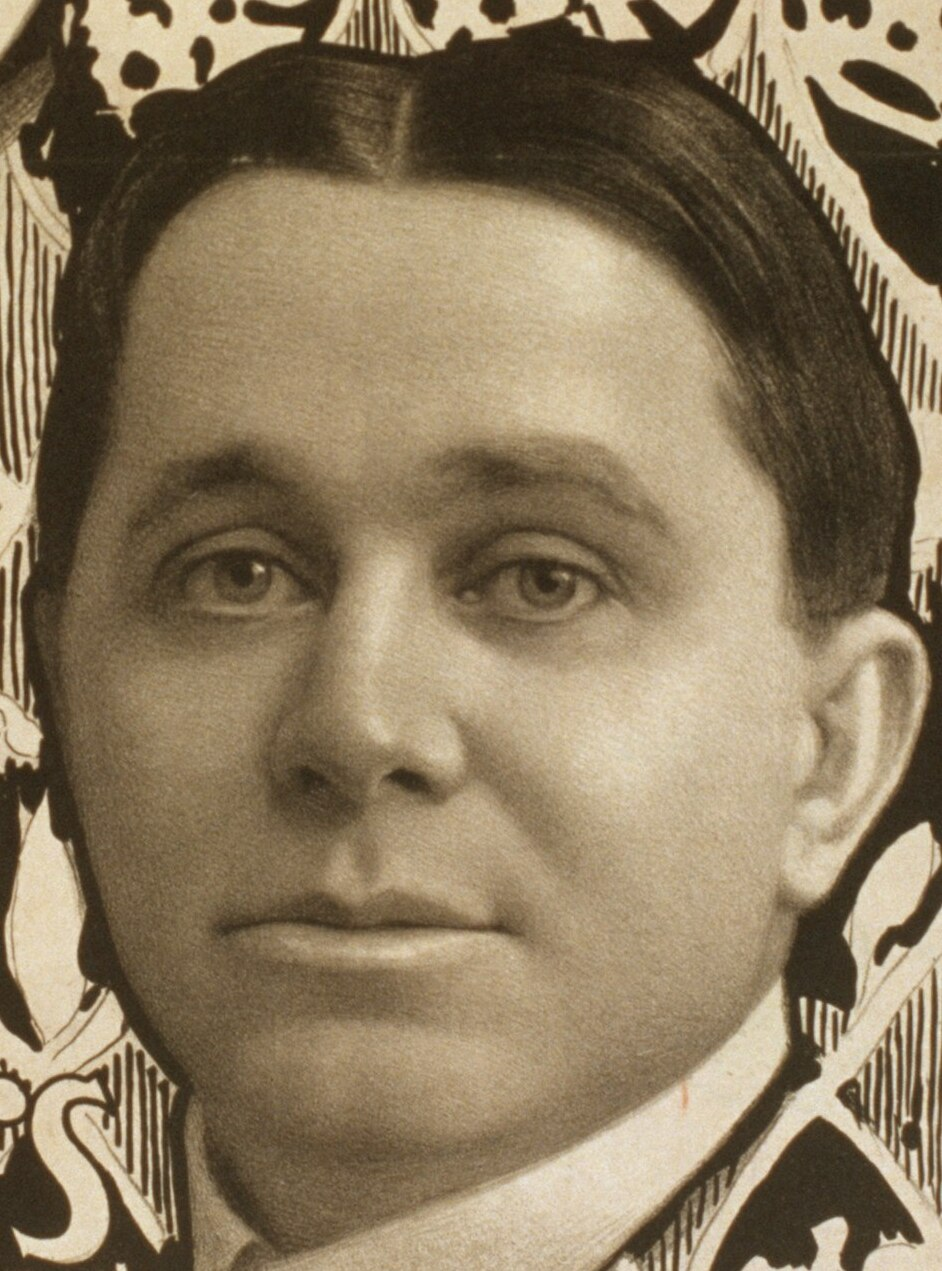
- On a poster for The Head Waiters (1901)
- Born: Harry Laughlin; December 29, 1866; Quincy, Illinois, U.S.
- Died: April 15, 1922 (aged 55); Boston, Massachusetts, U.S.
- Cause of death: Injuries caused by an explosion
- Resting place: Holy Cross Cemetery; Malden, Massachusetts
- Occupations: Comedian and actor
- Spouses: Margaret Daly (m. 1893; died 1908); Marie Francis (m. 1913)
- Children: 2

Harry Vokes (born Harry Laughlin; December 29, 1866 – April 15, 1922) was an American comedian and actor who was half of the comedy duo Ward and Vokes.

== Early life ==
Vokes was born Harry Laughlin in Quincy, Illinois. His father, Thomas B. Laughlin, was a postal inspector. Vokes learned acrobatics from John Ahern, a performer for the W. W. Cole Circus who later served as Quincy's police chief.

== Career ==
In 1886, Ahern received a contract to perform with the John B. Doris Circus and took Vokes with him. Soon thereafter, Vokes and Hap Ward began performing a tumbling act in music hall variety shows. They were discovered by an agent for Tony Pastor and began performing at his 14th Street Theatre. There, they launched their Harold and Percy sketch, which featured two ragged tramp characters delivering upper-class dialogue. They later changed the characters from tramps to a pair of wealthy loafers. The pair then transitioned to musical comedies, starring in A Run on the Bank (1895), The Governors (1898), The Floor Walkers (1900), The Head Waiters (1901), and A Pair of Pinks (1905). They performed with Margaret and Lucy Daly, who were the sisters of comedian Dan Daly. Vokes married Margaret Daly and Ward married Lucy Daly and the couples resided next to each other on Crescent Beach.

In 1905, the pair separated after Vokes decided to hire a new manager, James F. Lee, while Ward stayed with E. F. Stair. Vokes continued A Pair of Pinks with Will West in Ward's place and Ward starred in a new play, The Grafters, with his wife. Vokes later returned to vaudeville, performing sketches alongside his wife.

In 1908, Ward and Vokes reunited with a new play, The Promoters. Margaret Daly Vokes was slated to join the cast, but a year-long illness rendered her unable to perform. She died on August 27, 1908 at Ward's home in Lynnfield, Massachusetts while Vokes, Ward, and her sister Lucy were performing in Worcester, Massachusetts. In 1911, Ward and Vokes debuted their final play together, The Trouble Makers. In 1913, Vokes married Marie Francis, an actress from the Ward and Vokes company, in Grand Rapids, Michigan.

In 1915, Vokes starred in two motion pictures for Gaumont – The House Party and Beauty in Distress.

== Later life and death ==
Volkes retired from performing in 1918 and worked as a pump tender at the Beacon Oil Company refinery in Everett, Massachusetts. On April 14, 1922, Vokes and four others were injured by an explosion in the plant's compressor building. He died from his injuries the following day. Vokes was survived by his second wife and their two children. He was buried in Holy Cross Cemetery in Malden, Massachusetts.
