= Flywheel, Shyster, and Flywheel =

Comedy radio show (1932–1933)

- Other names: Beagle, Shyster, and Beagle
- Genre: Situation comedy
- Running time: 30 minutes
- Country of origin: United States
- Language: English
- Home station: NBC Blue Network
- Starring: Groucho Marx; Chico Marx
- Written by: Nat Perrin; Arthur Sheekman; George Oppenheimer; Tom McKnight
- Directed by: Nat Perrin; Arthur Sheekman
- Recording studio: WJZ, New York City; RKO Pictures, Los Angeles
- Original release: November 28, 1932 – May 22, 1933
- No. of series: 1
- No. of episodes: 26

Flywheel, Shyster, and Flywheel is a situation comedy radio show starring two of the Marx Brothers, Groucho and Chico, and written primarily by Nat Perrin and Arthur Sheekman. The series was originally broadcast in the United States on the National Broadcasting Company's Blue Network, beginning on November 28, 1932, and ending on May 22, 1933. Sponsored by the Standard Oil Companies of New Jersey, Pennsylvania and Louisiana and the Colonial Beacon Oil Company, it was the Monday night installment of the Five-Star Theater, an old-time radio variety series that offered a different program each weeknight. Episodes were broadcast live from NBC's WJZ station in New York City and later from a sound stage at RKO Pictures in Los Angeles, California, before returning to WJZ for the final episodes.

The program depicts the misadventures of a small New York law firm, with Groucho as attorney Waldorf T. Flywheel (a crooked lawyer) and Chico as Flywheel's assistant, Emmanuel Ravelli (a half-wit whom Flywheel uses as a fall guy). The series was originally titled Beagle, Shyster, and Beagle, with Groucho's character named Waldorf T. Beagle, until a real lawyer from New York named Beagle contacted NBC and threatened to file a lawsuit unless the name was dropped. Many of the episodes' plots were partly or largely based upon Marx Brothers films.

The show garnered respectable ratings for its early evening time slot, although a second season was not produced. It was thought that, like most radio shows of the time, the episodes had not been recorded. The episodes were thought entirely lost until 1988, when 25 of the 26 scripts were rediscovered in the Library of Congress storage and republished. Adaptations of the recovered scripts were performed and broadcast in the UK, on BBC Radio 4, between 1990 and 1993. In 1996, some recordings of the original show were discovered (all recorded from the final three episodes), including a complete recording of the last episode to air.

== Early development ==
In 1932 Texaco introduced its "Fire Chief" gasoline to the public, so named because its octane rating was 66, higher than the United States government's requirements for fire engines. To advertise its new premium grade fuel, Texaco approached vaudeville comic Ed Wynn to star in a radio show titled Fire Chief. Wynn played the fire chief in front of an audience of 700 and the show was aired live over the NBC Red Network, beginning April 26, 1932. It immediately proved popular with over two million regular listeners and a Co-Operative Analysis of Broadcasting (CAB) Rating of 44.8%.

Upon seeing the success of Wynn's Fire Chief, the Standard Oils in New Jersey, Louisiana and Pennsylvania, and Colonial Beacon, decided to sponsor their own radio program to promote Esso Gasoline and Essolube Motor Oil. They turned to the advertising agency McCann Erickson, which developed Five-Star Theater, a variety series that offered a different show each night of the week. Groucho and Chico Marx, one half of the popular vaudeville and film stars the Marx Brothers, were approached to appear in a comedy show. Harpo and Zeppo were not required, as Harpo's trademark mime artistry did not translate to radio, while Zeppo was on the verge of leaving the act. Before this decision was officially reached, early drafts of the scripts featured guest appearances written for both absent brothers, with Harpo being represented through honks of his horn and other trademark sound effects.

Nat Perrin and Arthur Sheekman, who had contributed to the scripts of the Marx Brothers' films Monkey Business (1931) and Horse Feathers (1932), were enlisted to write the comedy show. It was titled Beagle, Shyster, and Beagle, and its premise involved an unethical lawyer/private detective and his bungling assistant. (Note: "Beagle" sometimes means investigator; "Shyster" an unethical, unscrupulous lawyer.)

== Casting ==
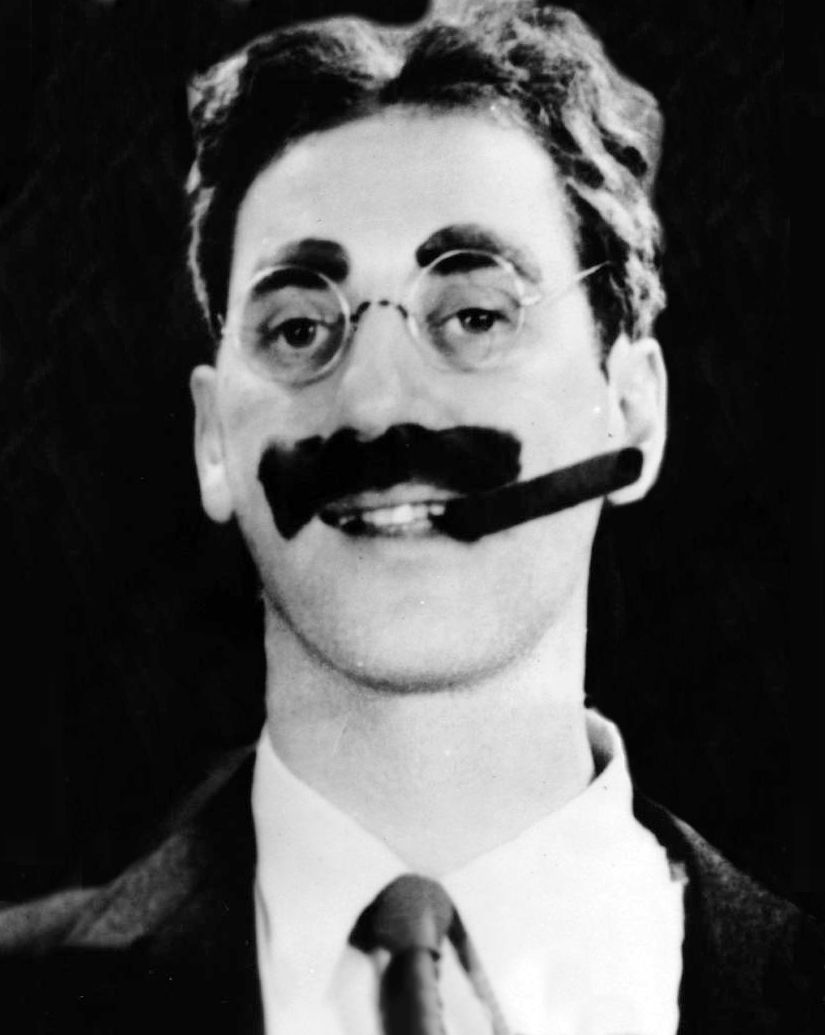
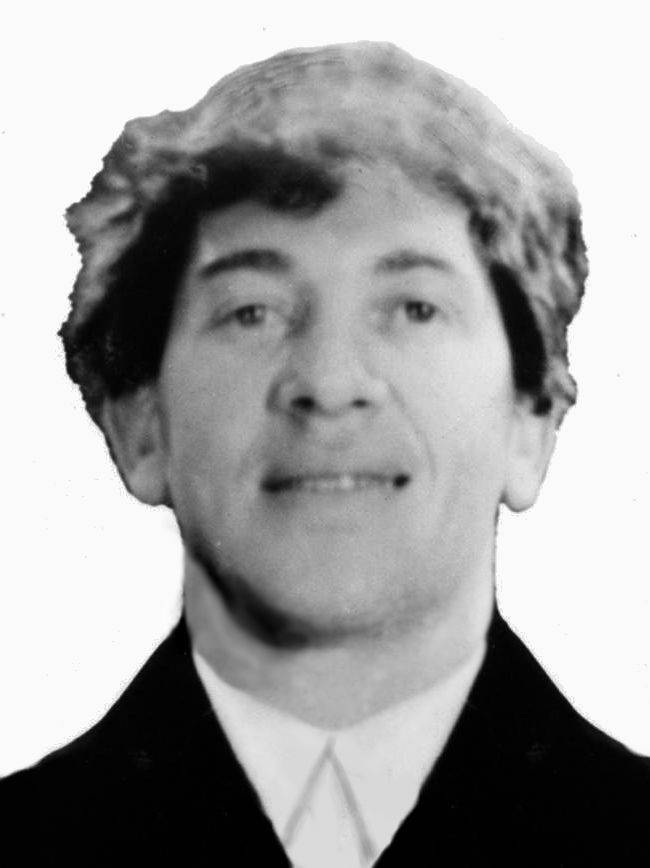
Groucho Marx as Waldorf T. Flywheel and Chico Marx as Emmanuel Ravelli

Groucho Marx played lawyer Waldorf T. Beagle (later renamed Waldorf T. Flywheel), and Chico played his assistant Emmanuel Ravelli, the same name as the Italian character he played in the film Animal Crackers (1930). Mary McCoy played secretary Miss Dimple, and it is thought that Broderick Crawford also appeared as various characters. "Shyster" and the second "Beagle" (and later, the second "Flywheel") are referred to only once outside of the show's title, when Flywheel explains that he is both Flywheels, while "Shyster ran away with my wife. And I put his name on the door as a token of my gratitude."

Groucho and Chico shared a weekly income of $6,500 for appearing in the show. During the Great Depression, this was considered a high sum for 30 minutes' work, especially since radio scripts required no memorization and only a few minutes were needed for costume, hair and makeup. By comparison, Greta Garbo's weekly salary from Metro-Goldwyn-Mayer during the same period was also $6,500, though this was for a 40- or 50-hour week. Wynn was paid $5,000 a week for Fire Chief. In contrast, almost two-thirds of American families were living on fewer than $26 a week. Harpo Marx was paid as a cast member, although the physical, silent nature of his comedy meant that it was impossible to give him an on-air role without forcing him to break character.

== Production ==
Five-Star Theater was broadcast from NBC's flagship station, WJZ in New York City. Because Groucho, Chico, Perrin, and Sheekman were living and working in Hollywood, they had to make a three-day train journey from Pasadena each week, and then another three-day trip back. The first episode was written as they took their first train ride to New York.

A number of Flywheel, Shyster, and Flywheel's scripts reused plots from Marx Brothers films. The plot of Episode 17 was suggested by the stolen painting plot in Animal Crackers, though it was a "Beauregard" in the film, not a Rembrandt. The 23rd episode also reused scenes from Animal Crackers, including the stolen diamond plot and Groucho's lines regarding the need for a seven-cent nickel. Monkey Business influenced two skits in Episode 25, and The Cocoanuts gave Episode 19 its plot. Episode 26, The Ocean Cruise, lifted some scenes virtually unchanged from the Marx Brothers' film Animal Crackers (with Zeppo Marx and Harpo Marx).

Despite reusing some scripts from other sources, Perrin said that he and Sheekman "had [their] hands full turning out a script each week". They found help from Tom McKnight and George Oppenheimer, whose names were passed along to Groucho. Perrin explained, "[Groucho] was in the men's room during a break, and he was complaining to the guy standing next to him, 'Geez, I wish we could find another writer or two to make life easier.' Suddenly there's a voice from one of the stalls: 'I've got just the guys for you!' Having Tom and George did make life easier, although Arthur and I went over their scripts for a light polishing."

After traveling to New York to perform the first seven episodes, the four men decided to broadcast from Los Angeles instead. NBC did not have a studio on the West Coast, so for the next thirteen weeks, between January 16 and April 24, 1933, the show was transmitted from a borrowed empty soundstage at RKO Radio Pictures. Folding chairs were brought in for the audience of around thirty or forty people – coming from vaudeville, Groucho and Chico preferred to perform to a crowd – and were quickly cleared out at the end of each performance so that the stage would be ready for any filming the following day. The last four episodes of the show were performed back at WJZ in New York.

Chico was often late for rehearsals, so Perrin would have to stand in for him on the read-throughs. When Chico eventually made his appearance, Perrin remembers, "he'd be reading Ravelli's lines and Groucho would tell him to stop [and make me] 'show him how the line should be read'. My Italian accent was better than Chico's, you see. But Chico didn't care."

== Episodes ==
Flywheel, Shyster, and Flywheel aired Monday nights at 7:30 p.m. on the NBC Blue Network to thirteen network affiliates in nine Eastern and Southern states. Twenty-six episodes were made, which were broadcast between November 28, 1932 and May 22, 1933. Each episode is introduced by the Blue Network announcer and features about fifteen minutes of drama and ten minutes of orchestral music between acts. The episodes end with Groucho and Chico – not in character, but as themselves – performing a 60-second skit promoting Esso and Essolube.

Episodes of Flywheel, Shyster, and Flywheel
"Episode 25"
Second half of "Episode 25" (Duration: 15 minutes, 3 seconds)

"Episode 26"
Complete audio recording of "Episode 26". (Duration: 29 minutes, 3 seconds)

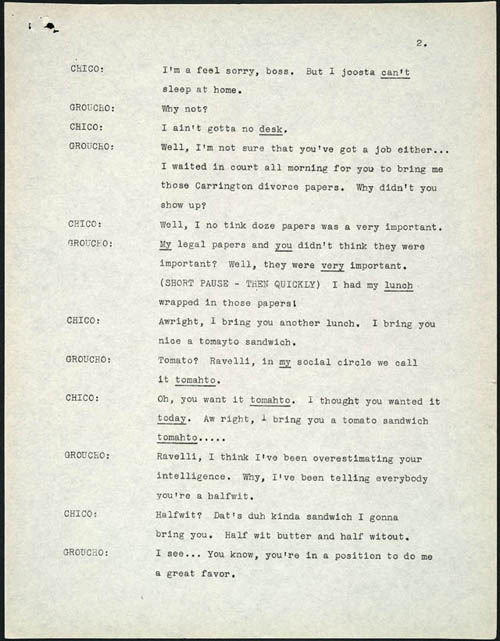
A sample page from a January 23, 1933, typed manuscript of the 1932–33 NBC radio show Flywheel, Shyster, and Flywheel that starred the Marx Brothers Groucho and Chico

Episode #	Airdate	Episode #	Airdate
1	November 28, 1932	14	January 27, 1933
2	December 5, 1932	15	March 6, 1933
3	December 12, 1932	16	March 13, 1933
4	December 19, 1932	17	March 20, 1933
5	December 26, 1932	18	March 27, 1933
6	January 2, 1933	19	April 3, 1933
7	January 9, 1933	20	April 10, 1933
8	January 16, 1933	21	April 17, 1933
9	January 23, 1933	22	April 24, 1933
10	January 30, 1933	23	May 1, 1933
11	February 6, 1933	24	May 8, 1933
12	January 13, 1933	25	May 15, 1933
13	January 20, 1933	26	May 22, 1933

== Reception ==
=== Ratings ===
Flywheel, Shyster, and Flywheel was not enough of a success for Standard Oil to continue beyond one season. The CAB Rating for the show was 22.1% and placed 12th among the highest rated evening programs of the 1932–33 season. The CAB Rating was not disappointing – popular established shows such as The Shadow and The Adventures of Sherlock Holmes did not perform as well – but it was less than half of Texaco's Fire Chief, which got a 44.8% CAB Rating and was the third highest-rated program of the season. One reason for the lower ratings may be because of the time slot the show aired. In September 1932, only 40% of radio owners were listening to the radio at 7:00 p.m., whereas 60% listened at 9:00 p.m. The 1932–1933 season's top-rated shows, The Chase and Sanborn Hour, Jack Pearl's Baron Münchhausen, and Fire Chief all aired after 9:00 p.m. Standard Oil decided it could not compete with Texaco in the ratings and Five-Star Theater was not renewed for a second season.

In his 1959 autobiography, Groucho and Me, Groucho comments, "We thought we were doing pretty well as comic lawyers, but one day a few Middle East countries decided they wanted a bigger cut of the oil profits, or else. When this news broke, the price of gasoline nervously dropped two cents a gallon, and Chico and I, along with the other shows, were dropped from the network." In his 1976 book, The Secret Word Is Groucho, he writes, "Company sales, as a result of our show, had risen precipitously. Profits doubled in that brief time, and Esso felt guilty taking the money. So Esso dropped us after twenty-six weeks. Those were the days of guilt-edged securities, which don't exist today."

=== Critical ===
Although the successful Marx films Monkey Business and Horse Feathers contained plots involving adultery, Variety did not appreciate them in the radio show:

That's fine stuff for children! Chances are that if the Marxes proceed with their law office continuity along lines like this they will never be able to hold a kid listener. Firstly because parents don't want their children to hear about bad wives and divorces, and this isn't an agreeable theme to kids. Which means that if the Marxes don't look out, whatever kid following they have on the screen will be totally lost to them on the air. It's quite likely the Marxes can make themselves on the air. But they will have to use more headwork than their first effort displayed.

Groucho's 13-year-old son Arthur found the show "extremely funny", albeit conceding that he may have been "a very easy audience".

=== Legal ===
Following the airing of the first episodes, a New York attorney named Morris Beagle filed a lawsuit for $300,000 alleging his name had been slandered, and that its use was damaging his business and his health. He also claimed that people were calling his law firm and asking, "Is this Mr. Beagle?" When he answered, "Yes", the callers would say, "How's your partner, Shyster?" and hang up the phone. The sponsors and studio executives panicked, and from episode four the title of the show was changed to "Flywheel, Shyster, and Flywheel", and Walter T. Beagle was renamed Waldorf T. Flywheel. It was explained in the episode that the character had divorced and reverted to his "maiden name".

=== Legacy ===
The show was later praised by other comedians of the time. In 1988, Steve Allen said, "when judged in relation to other radio comedy scripts of the early 30s, they hold up very well indeed and are, in fact, superior to the material that was produced for the Eddie Cantor, Rudy Vallee, Joe Penner school. The rapid-fire jokes [...] run the gamut from delightful to embarrassing." George Burns also found it "funny". Modern reviews of Flywheel, Shyster, and Flywheel have also been positive. The New York Times' Herbert Mitgang described it as "one of the funniest [...] radio shows of the early 1930s", adding that "the radio dialogue was so witty and outrageous, [an] innocent form of original comedy – as well as serious drama". Rob White of the British Film Institute said the show "glitter[s] with a thousand-and-one sockeroos."

== Existing material ==
=== Discovery of the scripts ===
The episodes of Flywheel, Shyster, and Flywheel were recorded, but for many years it was thought the recordings had not been preserved. At the time of the broadcasts, pre-recorded shows were frowned upon by advertisers and audiences. However, in 1988, Michael Barson, who worked in the United States Copyright Office at the Library of Congress, discovered that the scripts for twenty-five of the twenty-six episodes had been submitted to the Office, where they had been placed in storage. Nobody was aware that they still existed and their copyrights had not been renewed. This meant that Flywheel, Shyster, and Flywheel had fallen into the public domain. The scripts were published that same year by Pantheon in a book titled Flywheel, Shyster, and Flywheel: The Marx Brothers' Lost Radio Show, edited by Michael Barson and with an interview with Perrin.

In October 1988, Flywheel, Shyster and Flywheel scenes were broadcast for the first time since the show went off the air in 1933 when National Public Radio, a non-profit media organization that provides content to public radio stations around the United States, aired an 18-minute recreation of Flywheel, Shyster and Flywheel in markets that included Chicago, Los Angeles, and Dallas, Texas, using Washington, D.C.–based Arena Stage actors to perform the Chico and Groucho lead roles from the published scripts.

=== Rediscovery of lost recordings ===
After 1996, three recordings of Flywheel, Shyster, and Flywheel were found, including a five-minute excerpt of Episode 24 and a fifteen-minute recording of Episode 25. A complete recording of Episode 26 exists and was broadcast on BBC Radio 4 in 2005.

== BBC Radio adaption ==
The first series of the 1990 BBC remake was released on audio cassette in 1991.

In 1990 the British Broadcasting Corporation's Radio 4 aired a version of Flywheel, Shyster, and Flywheel. Michael Roberts and Frank Lazarus performed the lead roles of Flywheel and Ravelli, wearing make-up and clothing similar to Groucho and Chico. The regular cast also included Lorelei King in all the female roles and Graham Hoadly as many of the other male characters, and featured Spike Milligan and Dick Vosburgh as guest stars. The scripts for the BBC series were adapted for a modern British audience by Mark Brisenden and were produced and directed by Dirk Maggs. Each episode incorporated material from two or three different original episodes, and occasionally included additional jokes from Marx Brothers' films.

Commenting on the series, Maggs has said it was his favorite among the comedies he had directed, and described how they were performed.

The great thing about audience shows is doing the effects live on stage. BBC Radio Light Entertainment tended to have the effects operator hidden away behind curtains so they wouldn't distract the audience! A few Light Entertainment Producers like me have reasoned over the years that the spot effects are part of the entertainment so we brought the operator out front. And in the case of Flywheel we dressed him or her up as Harpo! Michael Roberts who played Groucho came out with such good ad libs that I was always happy to cut scripted gags to keep them. One great one was when he and Frank as Flywheel and Ravelli find themselves in a pigsty – the rest of the cast pushed in to make pig voices – and Mike ad libbed, "Imagine – two nice Jewish boys surrounded by ham" – it brought the house down.

— Dirk Maggs

Six episodes were performed and recorded at the Paris Theatre and aired weekly between June 2 and July 7, 1990. The success of the first series led to another two being commissioned. The second series aired from May 11 to June 15, 1991, and the third from July 11 to August 15, 1992. The first series was made available by BBC Enterprises on a two-cassette release in 1991, but the second and third series were not.
