= Frank Lazarus (composer) =

British and South African composer (1939–2025)

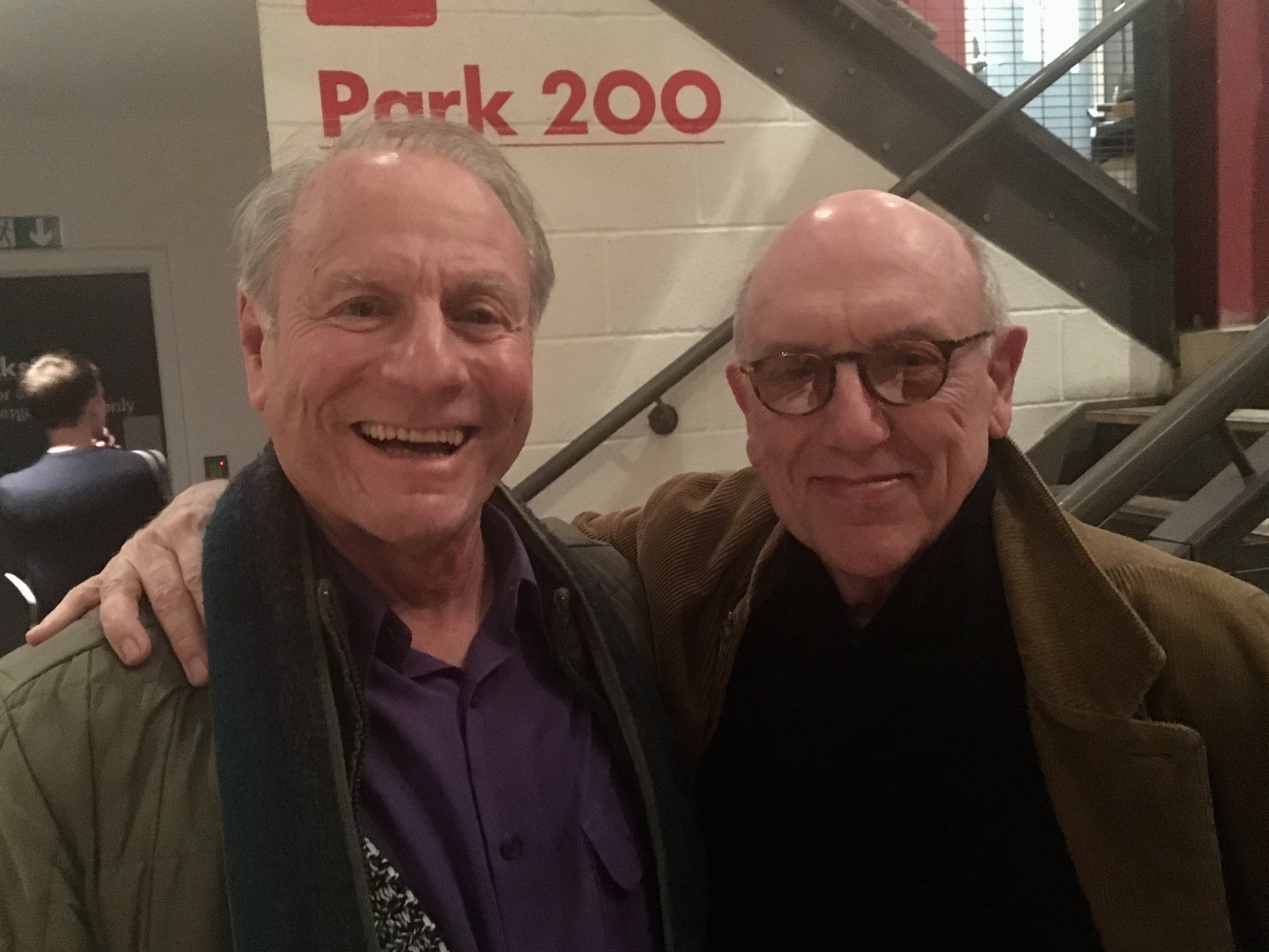
- Lazarus (left) with Mart Crowley (right) in 2016

Background information
- Born: May 4, 1939; Muizenberg, Cape Town, South Africa
- Died: September 14, 2025 (aged 86) London, United Kingdom
- Occupations: Actor, composer, lyricist

Frank Lazarus (4 May 1939 – 14 September 2025) was a British and South African actor, composer and lyricist. He was best known as the composer of the musical A Day in Hollywood / A Night in the Ukraine, for which he received a nomination for the Tony Award for Best Original Score in 1980. Lazarus also performed in the show, playing Carlo in both the 1979 London production and the subsequent Broadway run.

== Early life ==
Lazarus was born and brought up in Muizenberg, a suburb of Cape Town. His father, Louis, was a wine and brandy merchant and his mother, Doffie (née Hart), was a teacher and an amateur actress. He studied law at the University of Cape Town and worked for a short time in an attorney's office. His family were Jewish and as a child he sang in the choir of the Muizenberg Shul.

He emigrated to the United Kingdom in 1970 where he lived and worked for the remainder of his life.

== Early career ==
During his time in South Africa, he appeared on stage in various productions and adapted The Tree That Sat Down, a novel by Beverley Nichols, for the stage.

== An Evening with Maggie and Frank ==
In mid 1960s, he co-wrote the theatrical revue An Evening with Maggie and Frank with the actress Maggie Soboil and for which Lazarus also wrote music and lyrics. The show toured Australia in July 1968, including a series of performances at the Russell Street theatre in Melbourne.

== 1970s London ==
Lazarus appeared in several productions in London throughout the 1970s. In 1974 he understudied Ben Kingsley in an Athol Fugard play at the Royal Court Theatre.

He also appeared in film and television productions and his credits include the feature film Superman (1978), in which he played an Air Force One pilot, and the television serial Pennies from Heaven (1978). He also appeared in two episodes of EastEnders, among other roles.

== A Day in Hollywood/ A Night in the Ukraine ==
In 1978, when playing piano and portraying Erik Satie at the Greenwood theatre, Lazarus was spotted by the writer and lyricist Dick Vosburgh. Together they wrote what would become Lazarus' most notable achievement: A Day in Hollywood / A Night in the Ukraine. The production won the Evening Standard Award for Best Comedy and earned several nominations on Broadway, including Lazarus's Tony nomination for Best Original Score at the 1980 34th Tony Awards.

Mel Gussow, in The New York Times, described Lazarus as "one of the more antic members of the cast".

During the run of the show, the producers were sued by the heirs of the Marx brothers who claimed that their "right of publicity" had been infringed. Lazarus (and Vosburgh) were named as third party defendants in the case. Lazarus later developed a one-man piece based on his experiences of the show, The Hollywood/Ukraine Backers Audition.

== Later work ==
In 1992 Lazarus played Maxie Schwartz in June Moon, at the Vaudeville on the Strand. He starred as Horace Vandergelder opposite Prunella Scales’s Mrs Dolly Levi in The Matchmaker at the Chichester festival in 1993. His National Theatre work included the Gestapo officer in Jacobowsky and the Colonel in 1986.

Between 1990 and 1992 Lazarus starred in the BBC Radio 4 adaptation of Flywheel, Shyster and Flywheel, playing Emmanuel Ravelli (the counterpart to Chico Marx's character) opposite Michael Roberts as Waldorf T. Flywheel. The scripts used were rediscovered in 1988 and then adapted by Mark Brisenden and produced by Dirk Maggs. The series comprised three seasons (18 episodes) broadcast in front of a live studio audience.

== Death ==
Lazarus died in London on 14 September 2025, at the age of 86.
