= A Day in Hollywood / A Night in the Ukraine =

A Day in Hollywood A Night in the Ukraine
- Original Broadway cast recording
- Music: Frank Lazarus and others
- Lyrics: Dick Vosburgh
- Book: Dick Vosburgh
- Basis: A revue and Anton Chekhov's one-act play The Bear
- Productions: 1979 West End; 1980 Broadway

A Day in Hollywood / A Night in the Ukraine is a musical comedy consisting of two essentially independent one-act plays, with a book and lyrics by Dick Vosburgh and music by Frank Lazarus. Additionally, songs by other composers are incorporated into the score. The musical premiered in the West End and then ran on Broadway.

== Plot overview ==
The first act, A Day in Hollywood, is a revue of classic Hollywood songs of the 1930s performed by singers and dancers representing ushers from Grauman's Chinese Theatre. The second, A Night in the Ukraine, is loosely based on Anton Chekhov's one-act play The Bear, and is presented in the style of a Marx Brothers movie. We follow Serge B. Samovar, a lawyer based on Groucho Marx, as he attempts to collect a 1,800 ruble fee from Mrs. Pavlenko – a wealthy widow. Other characters in this act include Gino (a Harpo Marx-inspired character), Carlo (a Chico Marx-inspired character), Nina, and Constantine (arguably a character inspired by Zeppo Marx).

In a review of a regional production the reviewer from The New York Times commented that the musical "...has a hybrid score that lists music by Frank Lazarus, with book and lyrics by Dick Vosburgh, additional songs composed by Jerry Herman and a solid midsection medley devoted to the prolific composer of popular movie music, Richard A. Whiting. We are treated to a pleasant musical grab bag..."

== Productions ==
The musical premiered at the tiny New End Theatre in suburban Hampstead, London in late 1978, to great critical acclaim. This production transferred to the West End at the Mayfair Theatre on 28 March 1979, where it ran for 168 performances and won "Best Comedy" at the 1979 Evening Standard Theatre Awards.

The musical opened on Broadway at the John Golden Theatre on May 1, 1980, transferred to the Royale Theatre on June 17, 1980, and closed on September 27, 1981, after 588 performances and nine previews. The musical was directed and co-choreographed by Tommy Tune, with Thommie Walsh as co-choreographer, with scenic design by Tony Walton, costume design by Michel Stuart and lighting design by Beverly Emmons. The cast included David Garrison, Priscilla Lopez, Frank Lazarus, Peggy Hewett, Kate Draper, Albert Stephenson, and Stephen James.

An Off-Broadway revival premiered in 2022 and ran for 8 performances at Theatre Row. Directed by Robert Schneider and choreographed by Deidre Goodwin, the company included Mike Cefalo (Carlo / Frank), David B. Friedman (David / Samovar), Felipe Galganni (Sascha), Caleb James Grochalski (Male Swing / Dance Captain), Stephanie Israelson (Kate / Nina), Lauren Lukacek (Peggy / Pavlenko), Maria Grace Reginaldi (Female Swing), Suzanne Slade (Pricilla / Gina), Marina Vidal (Masha) and Mark William (Constantine / Stephen).

== Casts ==
	West End (1979)	Broadway (1980)	Off-Broadway Revival (2022)
Serge B. Samovar	John Bay	David Garrison	David B. Friedman
Mrs. Pavlenko	Paddie O'Neill	Peggy Hewett	Lauren Lukacek
Carlo	Frank Lazarus		Mike Cefalo
Gino	Sheila Steafel	Priscilla Lopez	Suzanne Slade
Constantine	Jon Glover	Stephen James	Mark William
Nina	Maureen Scott	Kate Draper	Stephanie Israelson
Sascha		Albert Stephenson	Felipe Galganni
Masha	Pera Koston*	Niki Harris	Marina Vidal

*Replaced by Alexandra Sebastian when the show transferred from the New End Theatre to the Mayfair Theatre.

== Songs ==
(Songs are by Vosburgh and Lazarus unless otherwise noted)

=== London Production ===
Act 1

- The Movies Get You Through
- Famous Feet
- Where Else But On the Silver Screen?
- A Day in Hollywood
- Tinseltown
- Story Behind the Song:
  - Cocktails for Two (Music and lyrics by Sam Coslow and Arthur Johnston)
  - Two Sleepy People (Music and lyrics by Hoagy Carmichael and Frank Loesser
  - Over the Rainbow (Music by Harold Arlen, lyrics by Yip Harburg
- Richard Whiting Medley:
  - It All Comes Out of the Piano
  - Ain't We Got Fun (Music by Richard A. Whiting, lyrics By Gus Kahn and Raymond B. Egan)
  - Too Marvelous for Words (Music by Whiting, lyrics by Johnny Mercer)
  - The Japanese Sandman (Music by Whiting, lyrics by Egan)
  - On the Good Ship Lollipop (Music by Whiting, lyrics by Sidney Clare)
  - Double Trouble (Music by Whiting and Ralph Rainger, lyrics by Leo Robin)
  - Louise (Music by Whiting, lyrics by Robin)
  - Sleepy Time Gal (Music by Whiting and Ange Lorenzo, lyrics by Egan and Joseph R. Alden)
  - It All Comes Out of the Piano
  - Beyond the Blue Horizon (Music by Whiting and W. Franke Harling, lyrics by Robin)
- Thanks for the Memory (Music by Rainger, lyrics by Robin)
- Easy to Love (Music and lyrics by Cole Porter)
- Another Memory
- Doin' the Production Code
- A Night in the Ukraine

Act 2

- A Night in the Ukraine (Entr'acte)
- Samovar the Lawyer
- Just Like That
- Again
- Gino's Harp Solo
- A Duel! A Duel!
- Carlo Plays Tchaikovsky
- Natasha
- A Night in the Ukraine (Reprise)

=== Broadway Production ===
Act 1

- Just Go to the Movies (Music and lyrics by Jerry Herman)
- Famous Feet
- I Love a Film Cliché (Music by Trevor Lyttleton MBE)
- Nelson (Music and lyrics by Herman)
- The Best in the World (Music and lyrics by Herman)
- Story Behind the Song:
  - Cocktails for Two (Music and lyrics by Sam Coslow and Arthur Johnston)
  - Two Sleepy People (Music and lyrics by Hoagy Carmichael and Frank Loesser
  - Over the Rainbow (Music by Harold Arlen, lyrics by Yip Harburg
- Richard Whiting Medley:
  - It All Comes Out of the Piano
  - Ain't We Got Fun (Music by Richard A. Whiting, lyrics By Gus Kahn and Raymond B. Egan)
  - Too Marvelous for Words (Music by Whiting, lyrics by Johnny Mercer)
  - The Japanese Sandman (Music by Whiting, lyrics by Egan)
  - On the Good Ship Lollipop (Music by Whiting, lyrics by Sidney Clare)
  - Double Trouble (Music by Whiting and Ralph Rainger, lyrics by Leo Robin)
  - Louise (Music by Whiting, lyrics by Robin)
  - Sleepy Time Gal (Music by Whiting and Ange Lorenzo, lyrics by Egan and Joseph R. Alden)
  - It All Comes Out of the Piano
  - Beyond the Blue Horizon (Music by Whiting and W. Franke Harling, lyrics by Robin)
- Thanks for the Memory (Music by Rainger, lyrics by Robin)
- Easy to Love (Music and lyrics by Cole Porter)
- Another Memory
- Doin' the Production Code
- A Night in the Ukraine

Act 2

- Hooray for Hollywood (Music by Whiting, lyrics by Mercer) (Added for the 2016 revival)
- Samovar the Lawyer
- Just Like That
- Again
- A Duel! A Duel!
- Natasha
- A Night in the Ukraine (Reprise)

== Awards and nominations ==
=== Original Broadway production ===
Year	Award	Category	Nominee	Result
1980	Tony Award	Best Musical		Nominated
1980	Tony Award	Best Book of a Musical	Dick Vosburgh	Nominated
1980	Tony Award	Best Original Score	Frank Lazarus and Dick Vosburgh	Nominated
1980	Tony Award	Best Performance by a Featured Actor in a Musical	David Garrison	Nominated
1980	Tony Award	Best Performance by a Featured Actress in a Musical	Priscilla Lopez	Won
1980	Tony Award	Best Direction of a Musical	Tommy Tune	Nominated
1980	Tony Award	Best Choreography	Tommy Tune and Thommie Walsh	Won
1980	Tony Award	Best Scenic Design	Tony Walton	Nominated
1980	Tony Award	Best Lighting Design	Beverly Emmons	Nominated
1980	Drama Desk Award	Outstanding Featured Actress in a Musical	Peggy Hewett	Nominated
1980	Drama Desk Award	Outstanding Choreography	Tommy Tune and Thommie Walsh	Won
1979–1980	Theatre World Award	Outstanding New York City Stage Debut	Stephen James	Won

== Lawsuit ==
Representatives of the Marx Brothers' interests (Groucho Marx Productions, on behalf of Groucho and Chico, and Harpo's widow Susan Marx) sued the musical's producers for violating the Marx Brothers' right of publicity. A lawyer for the plaintiffs said that they were not seeking to shut down the production, but only to demand a license fee for the use of the Marx Brothers characters. The District Court found in favor of the Marx heirs, applying New York law. However, on appeal, the decision was reversed, on the grounds that the Marx Brothers had been residents of California, and, at the time of the lawsuit, California law provided that a person's right of publicity either expired upon the person's death, or possibly, could pass to the person's heirs only under limited circumstances which could not restrict production of this musical. The lawsuit ultimately resulted in favor of the musical's producers.
