= Beverly Emmons =

Lighting designer

- Born: December 12, 1943 (age 82)
- Occupation: Lighting designer
- Spouse: Peter Simon
- Awards: 6 Tony Award nominations

Beverly Emmons (b. December 12, 1943) is an American lighting designer for the stage, dance and opera.

== Career ==
Emmons graduated from Sarah Lawrence College in 1965 and then worked as an assistant to Jules Fisher. Her first credit as a lighting designer was with the Off-Broadway play Sensations in 1970. Emmons first Broadway work was A Letter for Queen Victoria in 1975. She has been the lighting designer for many Broadway plays and musicals since then, most recently the revival of Annie Get Your Gun in 1999 and Stick Fly in 2011.

She has worked for ballet companies, including the Merce Cunningham Dance Company, and also for choreographers such as Martha Graham, Bill T. Jones and Trisha Brown. Her work for opera includes the Robert Wilson and Philip Glass opera Einstein on the Beach in November 1976 at the Metropolitan Opera House, and the Robert Wilson opera The Civil Wars: A Tree Is Best Measured When It Is Down, performed in 1986 at the Brooklyn Academy of Music.

She was on the graduate theater faculty of Columbia University, was the artistic director of the Lincoln Center Institute from 1997 to 2002, and is currently on the faculty of Sarah Lawrence College.

== Awards and nominations ==
Tony Award for Best Lighting Design nominee

- 1979 The Elephant Man
- 1980 A Day in Hollywood/A Night in the Ukraine
- 1987 Les liaisons dangereuses
- 1994 Passion
- 1995 The Heiress
- 1997 Jekyll and Hyde

Drama Desk Award Outstanding Lighting Design nominee

- 1979 The Elephant Man
- 1982 The Dresser
- 1994 Passion
- 1995 The Heiress
- 1996 Chronicle of a Death Foretold

== Broadway ==
- 2011 Stick Fly
- 1999 Annie Get Your Gun (revival)
- 1998 The Herbal Bed
- 1997 Jekyll & Hyde
- 1995 Chronicle of a Death Foretold
- 1995 The Heiress (revival)
- 1994 Passion
- 1993 Abe Lincoln in Illinois (revival)
- 1993 Shakespeare for My Father Associate Lighting Design
- 1992 The High Rollers Social and Pleasure Club
- 1990 Cat on a Hot Tin Roof (revival) Associate Lighting Design
- 1988 Michael Feinstein in Concert: Isn't it Romantic
- 1987 Les liaisons dangereuses Associate Lighting Design
- 1987 Stepping Out
- 1986 The Life and Adventures of Nicholas Nickleby (revival) Associate Lighting Design
- 1986 Mummenschanz:"The New Show"
- 1983 Doonesbury
- 1983 Total Abandon
- 1983 All's Well that Ends Well
- 1982 Good
- 1982 Is there life after high school?
- 1982 Little Me (revival)
- 1981 The Dresser
- 1981 The Life and Adventures of Nicholas Nickleby Associate Lighting Design
- 1981 Piaf
- 1980 Amadeus Associate Lighting Design
- 1980 A Day in Hollywood / A Night in the Ukraine
- 1980 Reggae
- 1980 Heartaches of a Pussycat
- 1979 The Elephant Man
- 1975 Bette Midler's Clams on the Half Shell Revue
- 1975 A Letter for Queen Victoria

== Projects ==
- Einstein on the Beach
- Merce Cunningham
- Executive Director of the Theatrical Lighting Database at the New York Public Library
- Executive Director of The Lighting Archive
