= Dick Vosburgh =

American-British comedy writer and lyricist (1929–2007)

- Born: Richard Kennedy Vosburgh; 27 August 1929; Elizabeth, New Jersey, US
- Died: 18 April 2007 (aged 77); London, England

Richard Kennedy Vosburgh (27 August 1929 – 18 April 2007) was an American-born Grammy and Tony-nominated comedy writer and lyricist, working chiefly in Britain.

== Early life ==
Vosburgh was born in Elizabeth, New Jersey, United States. He persuaded his father to let him study at the Royal Academy of Dramatic Art in London (where he met his future wife, Beryl Roques) and won the Comedy Acting prize. He was soon writing for BBC Radio, starting with scripts for Bernard Braden in 1953.

== Career ==
In the 60s he moved from radio to television, writing (and occasionally performing onscreen) on television comedy shows like The Frost Report, That Was The Week That Was, We Have Ways of Making You Laugh, Do Not Adjust Your Set, At Last The 1948 Show and How To Irritate People. On all these shows Vosburgh worked alongside members of what was to be Monty Python and he formed lasting friendships with them. He later appeared on one episode of Monty Python's Flying Circus as a bearded Russian spy who fights Lemming of the BDA, played by Eric Idle. Vosburgh also provided the serious-sounding voice-over on the theatrical trailer for the film Monty Python and the Holy Grail.

Throughout the 70s he was in the top tier of British comedy writers often partnering with Garry Chambers and Barry Cryer on material, working on the most popular shows of the time like The Two Ronnies, Morecambe and Wise and Who Do You Do? on which he was also script editor. Who Do You Do? pioneered a fast format of cutting between impressionists performing individual jokes against a neutral background which still feels modern today.

From the 70s onwards he wrote for many comedy television shows starring Ronnie Corbett, Ronnie Barker, David Frost, Roy Hudd, Bobby Davro, Frankie Howerd, Bob Monkhouse, Lenny Henry, Tommy Cooper, Freddie Starr and even visiting US stars such as Bob Hope and Joan Rivers.

Late in his career, he made a brief return to radio and worked on material for the radio revival of the Marx Brothers show Flywheel, Shyster and Flywheel.

Vosburgh would often get called in to "gag up" an existing movie script (meaning to add extra jokes to make it funnier), and worked on many films including Up Pompeii, Up the Chastity Belt, Carry On Nurse and Call Me Bwana and the sitcom Tell It to the Marines.

According to legend, he did much of his writing while continuously riding the Circle Line of the London Underground to avoid interruptions.

As a trained actor with a deep American voice living in London, Vosburgh was in demand for voice-over work. He voiced Larry Dart in the cult 1962 children's television show Space Patrol. His voice also appeared on many radio and television ads, for example, it was him saying "Flame-Grilled Whopper!" on Burger King's UK television ads for years. He was the recorded voice of The Grolier Electronic Encyclopedia, one of the first commercial CD-ROM titles.

As a lyricist, he had a reputation for being meticulous about the use of words and rhymes, and having a huge knowledge of the Hollywood and Broadway classic musicals. He wrote three West End musicals: the pastiche A Day in Hollywood/A Night in the Ukraine with composer Frank Lazarus (1979), Windy City (with Tony Macaulay, based on The Front Page, 1982) and A Saint She Ain't (with Denis King, 1999).

His greatest success was the Marx Brothers-parody musical comedy A Day in Hollywood/A Night in the Ukraine for which he wrote the book and lyrics. It started at a small fringe theatre, The New End in Hampstead, London and was an immediate hit. It soon transferred to the West End, running at the Mayfair Theater and was produced on Broadway the following year, 1980, in a significantly reworked version. It was a hit on Broadway, running for two seasons. It was this show that earned Vosburgh his three Tony nominations (Best Musical, Best Book of a Musical and Best Score Frank Lazarus). Overall the show got nine Tony nominations and won two. The original Broadway cast recording was nominated for a Grammy, earning Vosburgh his Grammy nomination.

In an article for the Times in 1982, Jane Ellison calls him 'a compulsive worrier, perfectionist and master of the wisecrack'. In the same article Dick says of himself:

"Television is not the ideal place for a Virgo to work. In fact, I am a Virgoan son of a Virgo, which is much much worse. I must be the most nit-picking person ever born - I sat up all night writing a speech for the wedding of one of my daughters. On stage, you can see the actors say your lines and you have a better chance to make them better next time. On television, you're reduced to clawing the screen."

He wrote many obituaries of comedians and B-movie actors for the Observer and The Times.

According to writer Garry Chambers, "When you were told you were working with such a [difficult] person again, he would say 'Be sure to give him my loathe.'" He also created the radio show of good songs from flop musicals Tunes the Backers Whistled While Jumping Off the Roof.

He is mentioned as being depicted in the background in the animated film A Liar's Autobiography

== Personal life and death ==
Vosburgh married Beryl Roques in 1953, and together had six children including actress Tilly Vosburgh and musician Matthew Vosburgh of the band Solid Space. He died in London, aged 77.

== Obituaries written by Dick Vosburgh ==
- Arnold Auberbach
- Joyce Blair
- Irving Brecher
- Bernard Bresslaw
- Bob Crosby
- Ted Dicks
- George Fenneman
- Buddy Feyne
- Ken Hoare
- Betty Hutton
- Paul Jerrico
- Leo Killion
- Dean Martin
- Spike Milligan
- Jack Paar
- Don Porter
- Dinah Shore
- Harold Spina
