= Hap Ward =

American actor (1868–1944)

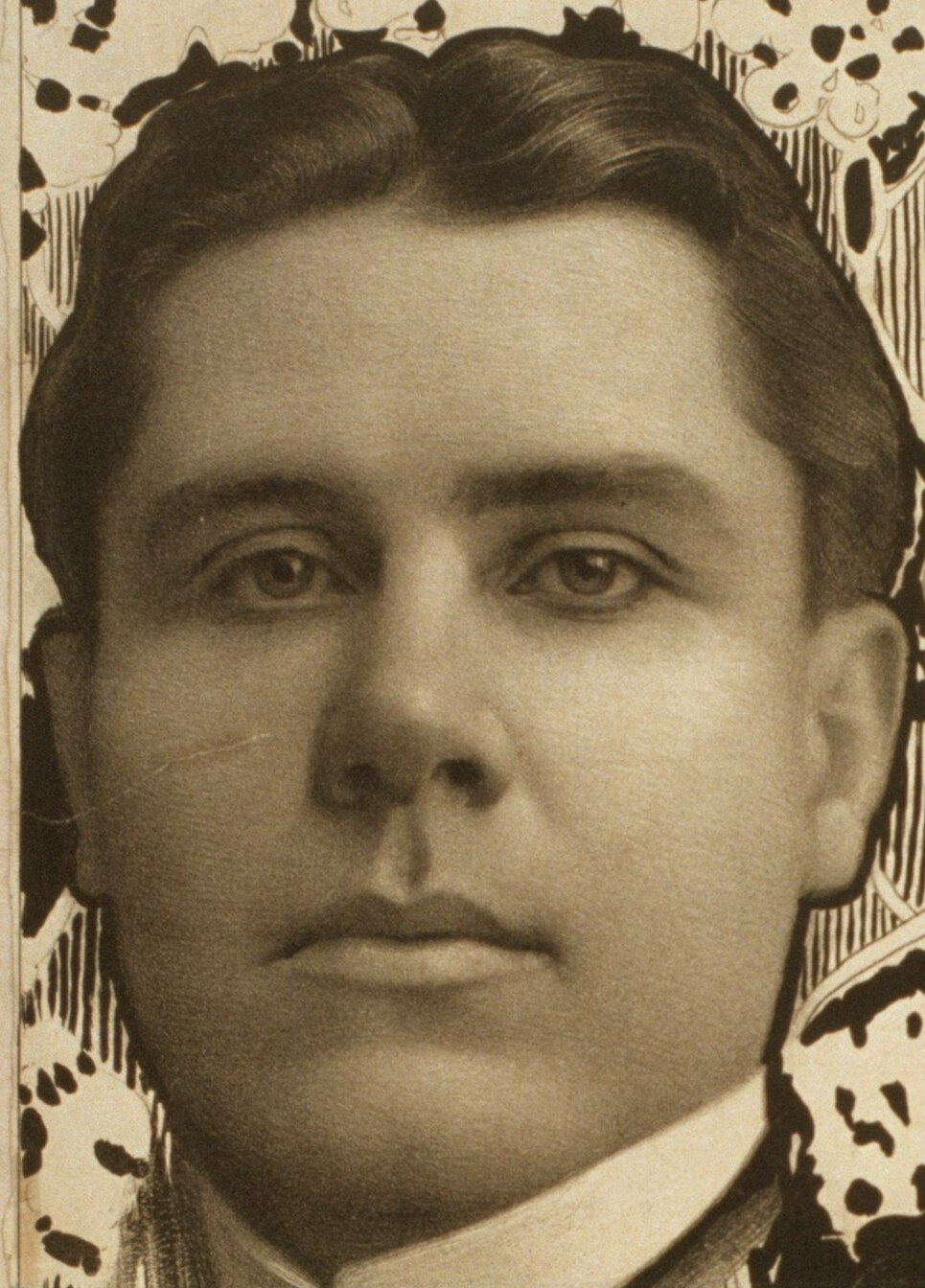
- On a poster for The Head Waiters (1901)
- Born: John Thomas O'Donnell; July 1868; Philadelphia, Pennsylvania, US
- Died: January 3, 1944 (aged 75); New York, New York, US
- Occupations: Actor, comedian, dancer

John Thomas O'Donnell (July 1868 – January 3, 1944), better known by his stage name Hap Ward, was an American comedian, dancer, and actor who was half of the vaudeville comedy duo Ward and Vokes.

Ward and Vokes toured widely in a series of musicals and vaudeville entertainments from 1894 through 1911. After this, Ward worked in other stage works without Vokes and starred in several films made from 1918 through 1929. The majority of his films were short comic silent films made with the actress Gale Henry between the years 1919 and 1921. His final film was the 1929 sound feature Fugitives in which he portrayed Scal "the Rat". He starred in several Broadway musicals during his career, including The Floor Walkers (1900) and the Ziegfeld Follies of 1923

== Life and career ==
Born John Thomas O'Donnell in Philadelphia, Hap Ward began his career in the theatre as a dancer. He formed a comedic partnership with the actor Harry Vokes in 1884, and the pair first achieved fame performing in theaters owned by the impresario Tony Pastor in which they excelled at portraying the tramps Harold and Percy; original characters they created which the duo portrayed in numerous stage works. These included the musicals A Run On the Bank (1895), The Governors (1898), The Floor Walkers (1900), The Head Waiters (1901), A Pair of Pinks (1905), The Promoters (1910), and The Trouble Makers (1911). The tramp characters of Harold and Percy generated comedy by behaving with gentlemanly manners of a higher social class while appearing like homeless vagrants. Ultimately these characters evolved from being unambitious tramps affecting upper class manners into "wealthy layabouts".

The Floor Walkers toured to Broadway's Grand Opera House for performances in 1900 and again in 1901. This work also starred sisters Margaret and Lucy Daly; the latter of whom was married to Hap Ward. Without Vokes, Ward starred in the Broadway musicals The Grafter (1906, as Bill Grafter), Not Yet, But Soon (1907, as Bill Nerve), and the Ziegfeld Follies of 1923.

Ward made his silent film debut in Francis Ford's The Silent Mystery (1918). This was followed by many comic silent films, most of them short films, made with the actress Gale Henry from 1919 through 1921; including the role of One Lung in The Detectress (1919) and parts in Pants (1919), The Slavey (1919), Her First Flame (1919), Her Week-end (1919), Lizzie's Luck (1919), Poor Fish (1919), Cash (1919), Sweet Cookie (1919), This Way Out (1920), Help! (1920), and Beat It (1921) to name a few. Ward later appeared in one sound film, portraying Scal "the Rat" in Fugitives (1929).

After retiring from acting, Ward operated a roadhouse outside of Boston for many years. At various points in his career he also worked as a theatre agent and producer. He was a member of The Lambs and was a founding member of The Catholic Actor's Guild of America. He died at his home in New York City on January 3, 1944 at the age of 76.
