= Standard Oil of Louisiana =

Oil company

- Formerly: Stanocola (1909-1924)
- Type: Subsidiary
- Founded: 1909; 117 years ago
- Defunct: 1944
- Fate: Absorbed by parent company
- Headquarters: Shreveport, Louisiana, United States
- Parent: Standard Oil of New Jersey

Standard Oil of Louisiana was an oil company created in 1909 as a subsidiary of Standard Oil of New Jersey (Esso, now part of ExxonMobil), a part of the Standard Oil trust. Located in Shreveport, Louisiana, it was known as Stanocola until 1924. In 1944 Standard Oil of Louisiana was absorbed into its parent company.
