= Hello, I Must Be Going (song) =

Song by Groucho Marx

from the album Animal Crackers
- Released: 1930
- Songwriter(s): Bert Kalmar, Harry Ruby

"Hello, I Must Be Going" is a song from the Marx Brothers' 1930 film Animal Crackers, written by Bert Kalmar and Harry Ruby. It was sung by Groucho, along with Margaret Dumont, just before the dialogue that preceded the song "Hooray for Captain Spaulding". It did not feature in the earlier stage production of Animal Crackers which opened on Broadway in 1928.

In the film story the song, together with “Hooray For Captain Spaulding”, create a mock grand operatic entry, complete with chorus, for the famed African explorer Captain Spaulding, played by Groucho. The song expresses Spaulding's contempt for this elaborate welcome.

The song is very closely associated with Groucho. A biography of Groucho was titled, Hello, I Must be Going! He also sang the song, with Erin Fleming, as the opening number of his Carnegie Hall concert in 1972.

== Other performances ==
In Oliver Stone's TV mini-series Wild Palms (1993), the title of the fifth and final episode, directed by Phil Joanou, was "Hello, I Must Be Going". The Marx Brothers song itself was sung by the character Senator Anton Kreutzer (played by Robert Loggia).
