= Animal Crackers (1930 film) =

1930 film starring the Marx Brothers

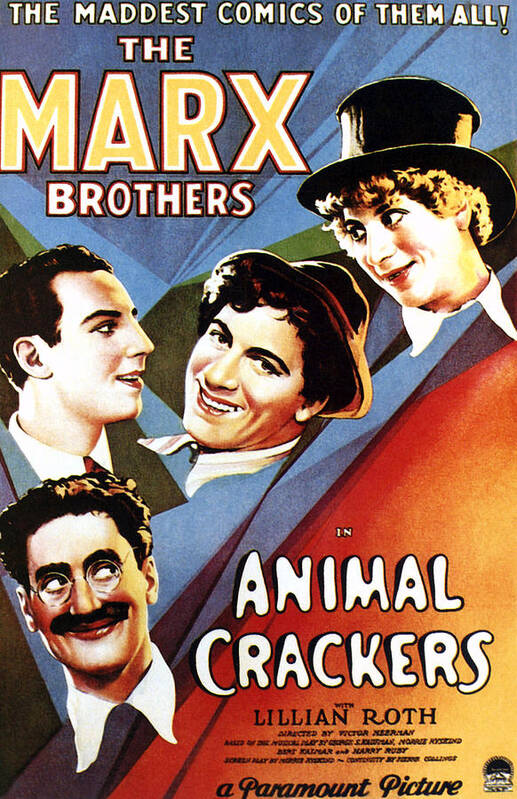
- Theatrical release poster
- Directed by: Victor Heerman
- Screenplay by: Morrie Ryskind
- Based on: Animal Crackers by: George S. Kaufman; Morrie Ryskind; Bert Kalmar; Harry Ruby
- Produced by: Walter Wanger
- Starring: Groucho Marx; Harpo Marx; Chico Marx; Zeppo Marx; Lillian Roth
- Cinematography: George J. Folsey
- Music by: Bert Kalmar; Harry Ruby
- Distributed by: Paramount Pictures
- Release date: August 28, 1930
- Running time: 98 minutes
- Country: United States
- Language: English
- Box office: $3.1 million (U.S. and Canadian rentals)

Animal Crackers is a 1930 American pre-Code comedy film starring the Marx Brothers and directed by Victor Heerman. It is based on the brothers' 1928 musical Animal Crackers by George S. Kaufman and Morrie Ryskind, with songs by Bert Kalmar and Harry Ruby. The screenplay was adapted by Morrie Ryskind. The film features Groucho, Harpo, Chico, and Zeppo Marx alongside Margaret Dumont and Lillian Roth. Set at a Long Island society party honoring eccentric African explorer Captain Jeffrey T. Spaulding (Groucho), the film serves as a vehicle for the Marx Brothers' absurdist comedy routines, with a minimal plot loosely structured around the theft of a valuable painting.

Produced by Paramount Pictures at their Astoria Studios in Queens, New York, Animal Crackers was the Marx Brothers' second feature film, following The Cocoanuts (1929). The production faced challenges adapting the stage musical to the emerging sound film format, as musical films were still in their infancy. The studio made extensive cuts to musical numbers and restructured the original material. Director Victor Heerman was hired to manage the disruptive behavior of the Marx Brothers on set.

The film was a critical and commercial success upon its original, uncut release. It was reissued in 1936 with cuts made to meet the newer Motion Picture Production Code. The film established several of the Marx Brothers' most famous characters, gags, and songs, with "Hooray for Captain Spaulding" and "Hello, I Must Be Going" becoming signature pieces.

The film's humor and surrealist elements influenced comedy filmmaking and earned recognition from avant-garde critics such as Antonin Artaud and filmmakers like François Truffaut and Jim Jarmusch. Legal issues over literary and distribution rights led to the film being withdrawn from circulation in the late 1950s. Following a fan campaign initiated by students and supported by Groucho himself, Universal Pictures, which by then owned the rights, settled the legal dispute in 1974. Animal Crackers was subsequently re-released to theaters and television. It was restored in 2016 based on an original print found in the British Film Institute, which included material previously censored in 1936. The film entered the public domain in the United States in 2026.

== Plot ==
Animal Crackers (1930)

Society matron Mrs. Rittenhouse hosts a weekend party at her Long Island mansion to honor African explorer Captain Jeffrey T. Spaulding, who has recently returned from his expeditions. The entertainment includes the unveiling of art patron Roscoe W. Chandler's newly acquired painting, After the Hunt, by the celebrated artist, Beaugard. Musicians Signor Emanuel Ravelli and his silent partner, known only as the Professor, are among the guests. Borne on a sedan chair by African natives, Captain Spaulding arrives and announces his immediate departure ("Hello, I Must Be Going") and Mrs. Rittenhouse and the guests sing his praises ("Hooray for Captain Spaulding").

Mrs. Rittenhouse's daughter, Arabella, hits on a plan to advance her fiancé John Parker's artistic career: John painted a nearly perfect copy of the Beaugard work during his studies, and the couple intends to swap his version for the original. They hope the deception, when revealed, will impress Chandler with John's talent. Arabella enlists Ravelli to switch the paintings.

Two other party guests—Mrs. Whitehead and Grace Carpenter—have a similar plan, though their motivation is to embarrass Mrs. Rittenhouse. Grace had also copied the Beaugard in art school, but it is a poor imitation. Hives, the Rittenhouse butler, is persuaded by Grace and Mrs. Whitehead, his former employer, to substitute their painting. In their ignorance of the first plot, they inadvertently remove John's superior copy rather than the original.

Ravelli and the Professor encounter Chandler and recognize him as "Abie", a fish peddler from Czechoslovakia operating under an assumed identity. (Note: Some sources incorrectly state that Ravelli identifies the character as "Abe Kabibble". In the scene, "Abe Kabibble" is only one of the names Ravelli guesses before correctly arriving at "Abie". Abe Kabibble was the lead character in the contemporary comic strip Abie the Agent, and looks similar to the Chandler character.) During a nighttime thunderstorm that plunges the mansion into darkness, Ravelli and the Professor attempt their own painting switch, only to be interrupted by Captain Spaulding and Mrs. Rittenhouse. (Note: Some film scholars have noted that the brothers' characters may be played by stand-ins during the blackout sequence where the paintings are switched. The author Matthew Coniam, author of The Annotated Marx Brothers, who documented this, was unable to find out why they might have been used. Some have hypothesized that Zeppo may have doubled for Groucho, since he sometimes did so on stage, but there is no direct evidence of this. Coniam was able to identify the brothers' official stand-ins as Jack Cooper (for Harpo), Packey O'Gatty (for Chico), and Henry Van Bousen (for Groucho).)

The guests assemble for a lecture on Africa by Captain Spaulding, followed by music from Ravelli and the Professor ("I'm Daffy Over You", "Silver Threads Among the Gold"). After adjourning to the library, Mrs. Rittenhouse unveils the painting; Chandler immediately spots Grace's poor copy and realizes his valuable artwork has been stolen. John, observing the revealed painting, mistakenly believes his own work is still in place and is crestfallen by Chandler's negative reaction. A second power outage occurs during the commotion, and when the lights return, the substitute painting has vanished, leaving the assembled guests confused. Mrs. Whitehead and Grace laugh at Mrs. Rittenhouse's humiliation. John and Arabella reflect on how romantic it was to be there when the theft took place ("Why Am I So Romantic?").

The following day, Police arrive to investigate the theft. John discovers Grace's inferior copy and realizes that multiple parties attempted the same deception. After retrieving another version from the Professor, John and Arabella present their findings to Captain Spaulding. The Professor is apprehended, and all three paintings are recovered and sorted out. When Chandler briefly mistakes John's skillful copy for the genuine Beaugard, he recognizes the young man's artistic ability and commissions him for a series of portrait paintings.

The Professor escapes custody and employs a Flit gun to spray the assembled guests with some sort of sedative, rendering everyone unconscious. After successfully incapacitating all present, the Professor spots a pretty blonde girl he had been pursuing at intervals throughout the film and knocks himself out as well, to lie down beside her on the floor.

== Cast ==
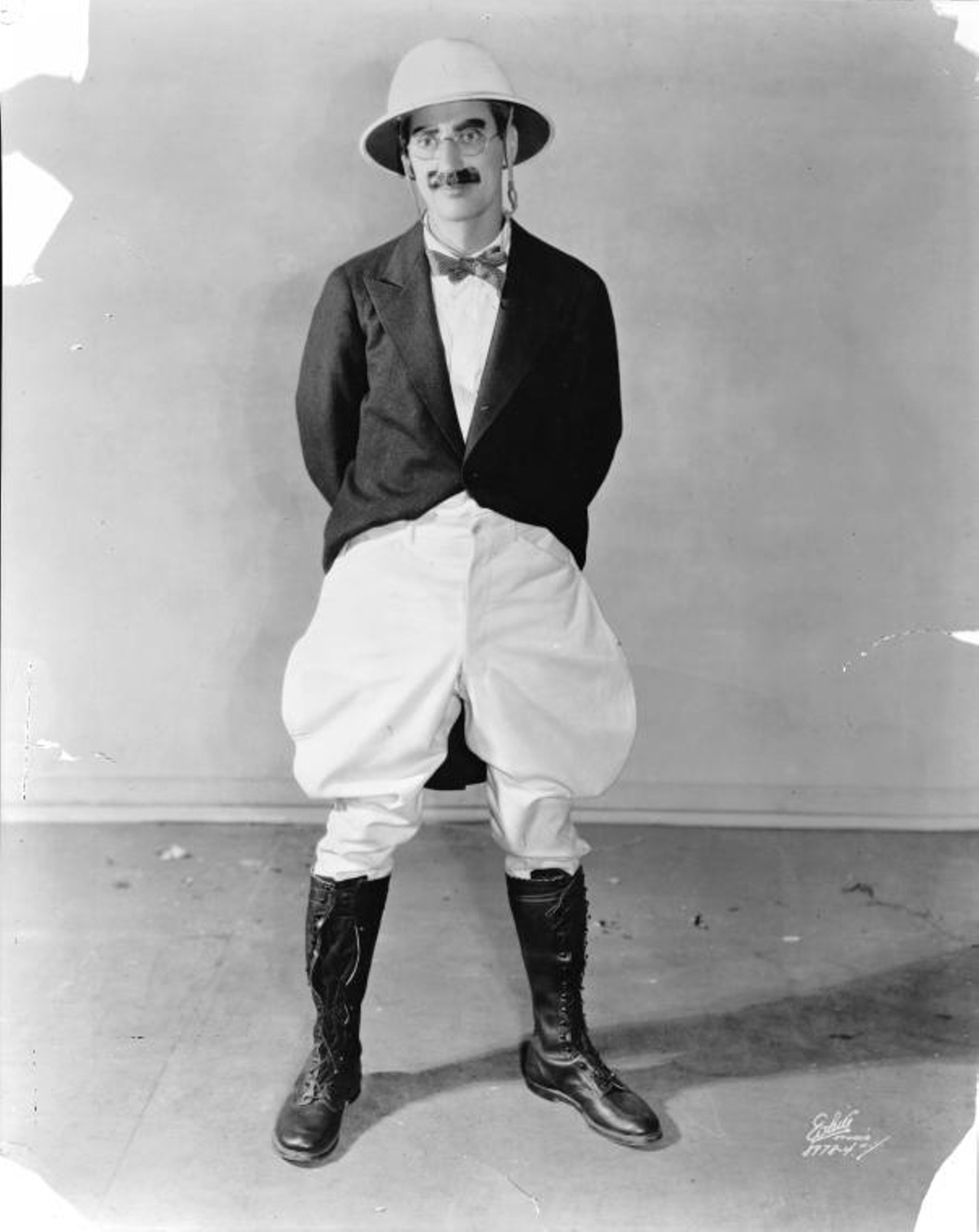
Groucho as Captain Spaulding in a 1928 publicity photo for the stage musical

- Groucho Marx as Captain Jeffrey T. Spaulding (Note: On the opening cast card, Groucho is billed as "Jeffrey Spaulding". A newspaper headline shown immediately after the credits identifies him as "Captain Geoffrey T. Spaulding".)
- Harpo Marx as the Professor
- Chico Marx as Signor Emanuel Ravelli
- Zeppo Marx as Horatio Jamison
- Margaret Dumont as Mrs. Rittenhouse
- Lillian Roth as Arabella Rittenhouse
- Hal Thompson as John Parker
- Louis Sorin as Roscoe W. Chandler
- Margaret Irving as Mrs. Whitehead
- Kathryn Reece as Grace Carpenter
- Robert Greig as Hives, the Rittenhouse butler
- Edward Metcalf as Inspector Hennessey
- The Music Masters as Six Footmen

== Production ==
=== Development ===
After the commercial success of The Cocoanuts, Variety announced that Paramount Pictures signed the Marx Brothers for a follow-up film in February 1930. Paramount had not yet secured the rights to Animal Crackers, the brothers' then-current Broadway musical, from producer Sam H. Harris. The studio instead planned to commission an original screenplay from Ben Hecht, but by March, it was reported that Paramount had obtained the film rights to Animal Crackers and began pre-production, with the goal of commencing filming in May.

The stage-to-screen adaptation presented challenges during the early sound era. The original cut of The Cocoanuts was longer than the musical itself; it had to be edited extensively to achieve a shorter runtime. To avoid the same problem, Paramount enlisted co-author Morrie Ryskind to accompany the Marx Brothers on the national tour of Animal Crackers to observe performances and identify material suitable for elimination. The adaptation process involved numerous revisions that significantly changed the original structure of the stage version. Some characters and scenes were removed and a few roles were amalgamated. Mary Stewart, the female love interest was merged with the Arabella Rittenhouse character, while art dealer Monsieur Doucet was combined with wealthy financier Roscoe W. Chandler.

Paramount hired Victor Heerman as director partly due to his reputation for maintaining discipline with performers, as both the Marx Brothers and Lillian Roth were known for unprofessional behavior on set. Heerman also contributed to the cuts, insisting on the removal of most of the musical numbers, including the play's grand finale, which featured the brothers as 18th-century French courtiers romancing Madame du Barry. When the Marx Brothers, Ryskind, and composers Bert Kalmar and Harry Ruby objected to removing the musical elements, Heerman held a test screening with early footage. The test audience's enthusiastic response convinced the creative team to support Heerman's vision. However, he agreed to retain "Hooray for Captain Spaulding" at Ryskind's urging.

Much of the cast, including the Marx Brothers, Margaret Dumont, Louis Sorin, Robert Greig, and Margaret Irving, reprised their roles from the Broadway production. The love interests from the play—Bernice Ackerman as Mary Stewart and Milton Watson as John Parker—were replaced by Lillian Roth (as Arabella Rittenhouse; John Parker's love interest in the play was Mary Stewart, not Arabella. Arabella Rittenhouse was originally played by Alice Wood) and Hal Thompson. Roth's involvement in the production, however, was reportedly involuntary. In Roth's 1954 autobiography I'll Cry Tomorrow, she recalled that B. P. Schulberg, Paramount's head of West Coast production, told her she was being sent to New York "to be kicked in the rear by the Marx Brothers" as punishment for her difficult behavior on set. Roth burst into tears when given the news.

=== Filming ===
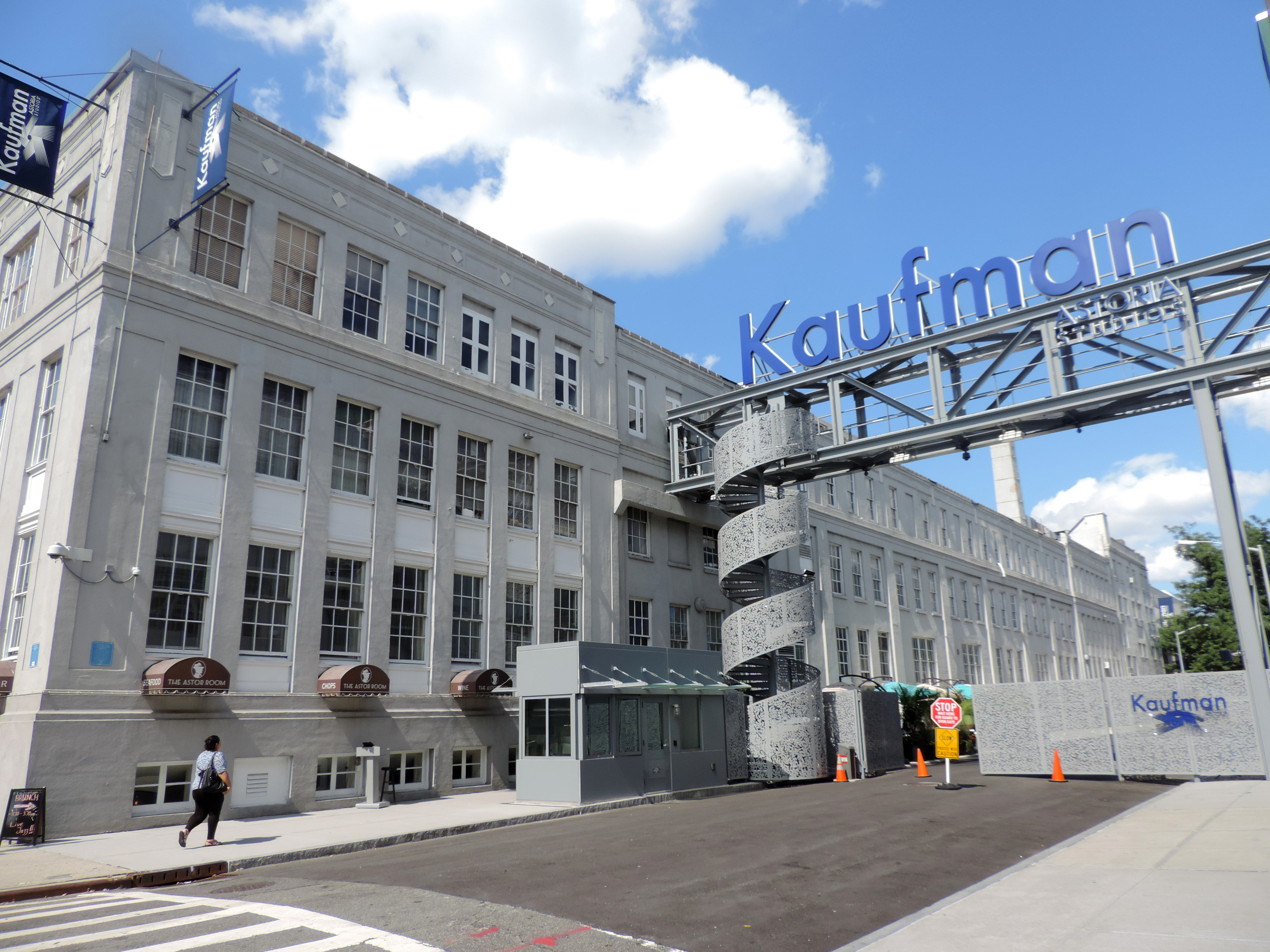
Kaufman Astoria Studios, pictured in 2014

Principal photography began at Astoria Studios in Queens on April 28, 1930. Art director William Saulter designed the elaborate art deco Rittenhouse manor set with a detailed lawn and interior. At the time, it was the largest set ever built at Astoria.

Like other studios, Paramount faced significant challenges in capturing quality audio recordings during the early sound era. The Cocoanuts was notably hampered by primitive sound recording technology, forcing directors to use cumbersome workarounds to reduce background noise; these included minimizing camera movement and soaking paper props in water to prevent audible crinkling. (Note: The presence of wet paper is especially noticeable in the famous "Why a Duck?" sequence in The Cocoanuts.) While recording technology had advanced by 1930, eliminating most of these constraints, music still required on-set recording rather than post-production dubbing, a constraint that complicated the editing process. Because the middle of a scene could not be cut without an abrupt musical break, director Victor Heerman recalled that the music department ultimately chose which take was used, once preferring a take where Groucho had moved out of shot because "the clarinet sounded much better".

On-set footage shot in Multicolor.

During screen tests, some shots were filmed using the Multicolor process. This footage, which is the earliest known color film of the Marx Brothers, features Harpo without his usual costume and wig. It was later incorporated into the short film Wonderland of California. Because only four Multicolor cameras existed, shooting the film entirely in color was impractical. Instead, the sequence was used to help persuade Howard Hughes to invest in the color process. (Note: Hughes later used the Multicolor process for one scene in his film Hell's Angels.) Approximately 15 seconds of this test footage resurfaced in the 1990s and aired as part of the 1998 Turner Classic Movies documentary Glorious Technicolor.

Lillian Roth remembered the filming as "one step removed from a circus", with the Marx Brothers regularly arriving late, taking long lunches, and leaving early. To manage them, Heerman assigned an assistant director to track each of them. Rumors persisted that Heerman had constructed an actual jail cell to confine the brothers, but he denied this: "These were adult men", Heerman recalled, "and they didn't have to be locked in". Contemporary reports describe a makeup trailer decorated to resemble a jail cell, complete with "Animal Crackers Hoosegow" painted on its exterior. It was never locked, but served as a relaxation space for the performers.

Principal photography for Animal Crackers was complete by mid-June, although Harpo, who had developed glandular fever, had to be brought back over the Fourth of July weekend to film his harp solo.

=== Censorship ===
After the Motion Picture Production Code was adopted by the film industry in 1930, the producers of Animal Crackers had to submit their script for approval prior to filming. Even though the code was not strictly enforced before 1934, censors still had much of the material removed or altered during pre-production. References to Arabella Rittenhouse's drinking were cut, including the line, "Don't worry, mother, I won't disgrace you. I can hold my liquor with any of them." The censors also removed references to Mussolini and required changes to Jamison's lyrics, transforming "the women hot, the champagne cold" to "the women warm, the champagne cold".

After filming was complete, censors suggested more cuts, but the studio largely ignored them. Several double entendres were proposed for deletion, including the lines, "We took some pictures of the native girls but they weren't developed. We are going back in a couple of weeks", and "Signor Ravelli's first selection will be 'Somewhere My Love Lies Sleeping' with a male chorus." During "Hooray for Captain Spaulding" Groucho's line, "I think I'll try and make her", which followed Mrs. Rittenhouse's declaration, "He is the only white man to cover every acre", was flagged for removal but retained.

=== Music ===
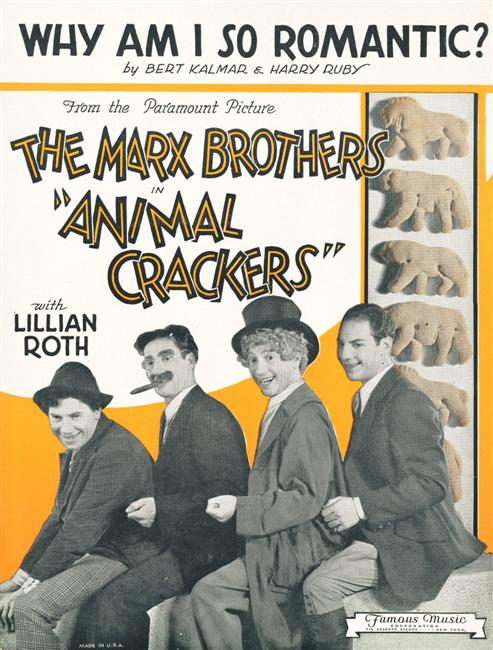
Cover of the sheet music for the song "Why Am I So Romantic"

The majority of the music written by Kalmar and Ruby for the Animal Crackers musical was not used in the film. Songs that were present in the musical but removed from the film include "Cool Off" and "The Long Island Low-Down", sung by Grace Carpenter; "News", "When Things Are Bright and Rosy", "Who's Been Listening to My Heart?", and "Watching the Clouds Roll By", sung by the romantic leads; the ensemble piece "Go Places and Do Things"; and a Marx Brothers piece from the cut du Barry scene, "We're Four of the Three Musketeers". The opening number, with Hives and the six footmen was drastically cut; the original version contained several additional verses, including parts sung by the maids and guests. The song performed by Roth and Thompson, "Why Am I So Romantic", was written specifically for the film.

The film features the following musical numbers, all written by Kalmar and Ruby unless otherwise indicated:

1. Opening (performed by Hives and Six Footmen)
2. "I Represent the Captain" (performed by Zeppo Marx)
3. "Hooray for Captain Spaulding" Part I (performed by the cast)
4. "Hello, I Must Be Going" (performed by Groucho Marx)
5. "Hooray for Captain Spaulding" Part II (performed by the cast)
6. "Why Am I So Romantic?" (performed by Lillian Roth and Hal Thompson, followed by a harp solo by Harpo Marx)
7. "I'm Daffy Over You" (composed and performed by Chico Marx) (Note: The refrain to "I'm Daffy Over You" is sometimes confused with the 1950s song "Sugar in the Morning")
8. "Silver Threads Among the Gold" (traditional, performed by Chico Marx)
9. Brief piano interlude (performed by Harpo Marx)
10. "Gypsy-Chorus" ("Anvil Chorus") (Giuseppe Verdi, performed by Chico Marx)
11. "My Old Kentucky Home" (traditional, performed by the Marx Brothers)

Chico Marx's piano composition "I'm Daffy Over You" became his signature tune. It was featured again in their next film, Monkey Business (1931) and is heard briefly in Horse Feathers (1932). Chico can be heard playing the song in his final appearance, in the television pilot Deputy Seraph.

== Themes ==
=== Social satire ===
Animal Crackers is often identified as a work of social satire. Author Simon Louvish characterizes the Marx Brothers as anti-establishment figures who challenge social hierarchies with their anarchic behavior. He views Captain Spaulding as a "social climber who loves to saw the rungs off the ladder—even if these are the rungs still above him". According to his analysis, the brothers reveal the falsehoods behind the etiquette and manners of the upper class. In this process, "Abie the Fishpeddler is exposed, the police are confounded, and the sweet hopes of youth are realized."

Ultimately, Louvish suggests that the film depicts society's triumph over its revolutionaries, who will eventually join it on their own terms. He cites Harpo's final act of anesthetizing himself alongside the party guests as evidence that the brothers ultimately seek acceptance within the establishment.

In a 1976 essay, writer Gianni Celati argued that this anti-establishment tone is realized through the brothers' physical roughness. He observed that they turn crowded spaces into stages where they mock and degrade high-status objects; for example, Harpo treats a valuable painting—a symbol of the establishment—as a common blanket.

The satire extends to Zeppo, typically the group's straight man. In a scene where Groucho dictates a convoluted letter, Zeppo subverts the expected role of the obedient subordinate by admitting he omitted the parts he did not think were important. Critic Joe Adamson observed that "it takes a Marx Brother to pull something like that on a Marx Brother and get away with it".

=== Anarchic humor and surrealism ===
Animal Crackers generated critical debate over whether its comedic approach constitutes surrealism. Avant-garde writer Antonin Artaud considered the film to be an example of the style. He believed the film liberated viewers from reality, achieving through cinema "a particular magic" that freed audiences through surrealist imagery. He suggests the film's intent goes beyond mere humor; it constitutes a "destruction of all reality in the mind".

By contrast, filmmaker Jim Jarmusch argues that Artaud misinterprets the brothers because of his lack of proficiency in the English language. He characterizes the brothers' work as anarchist, but disagrees that it is surrealist. Historian Keith Eggener noted a disconnect between the formal theories of surrealism as expressed by writers like André Breton and how surrealism was interpreted in the United States, which he characterized as stripping away surrealism's revolutionary intent, saying that "when Americans at this time spoke of Surrealism's attachment to Marx, they were usually talking about Groucho or Harpo". Eggener posits that the brothers' work may have had surrealist aesthetic elements, but without deeper symbolic imagery, it would not have fit the definition of surrealism.

The Marx Brothers' relationship with surrealism was complicated by their commercial priorities. Painter Salvador Dalí described Animal Crackers as "the summit of the evolution of comic cinema". However, when Dalí prepared an explicitly surrealist script seven years later for a proposed Marx Brothers film for Metro-Goldwyn-Mayer, it was rejected as being too surreal. In a meeting with Dalí and MGM executives, Groucho dismissed the proposal as uncommercial, saying "it won't play".

== Release ==
=== 1930 release and 1936 re-release ===
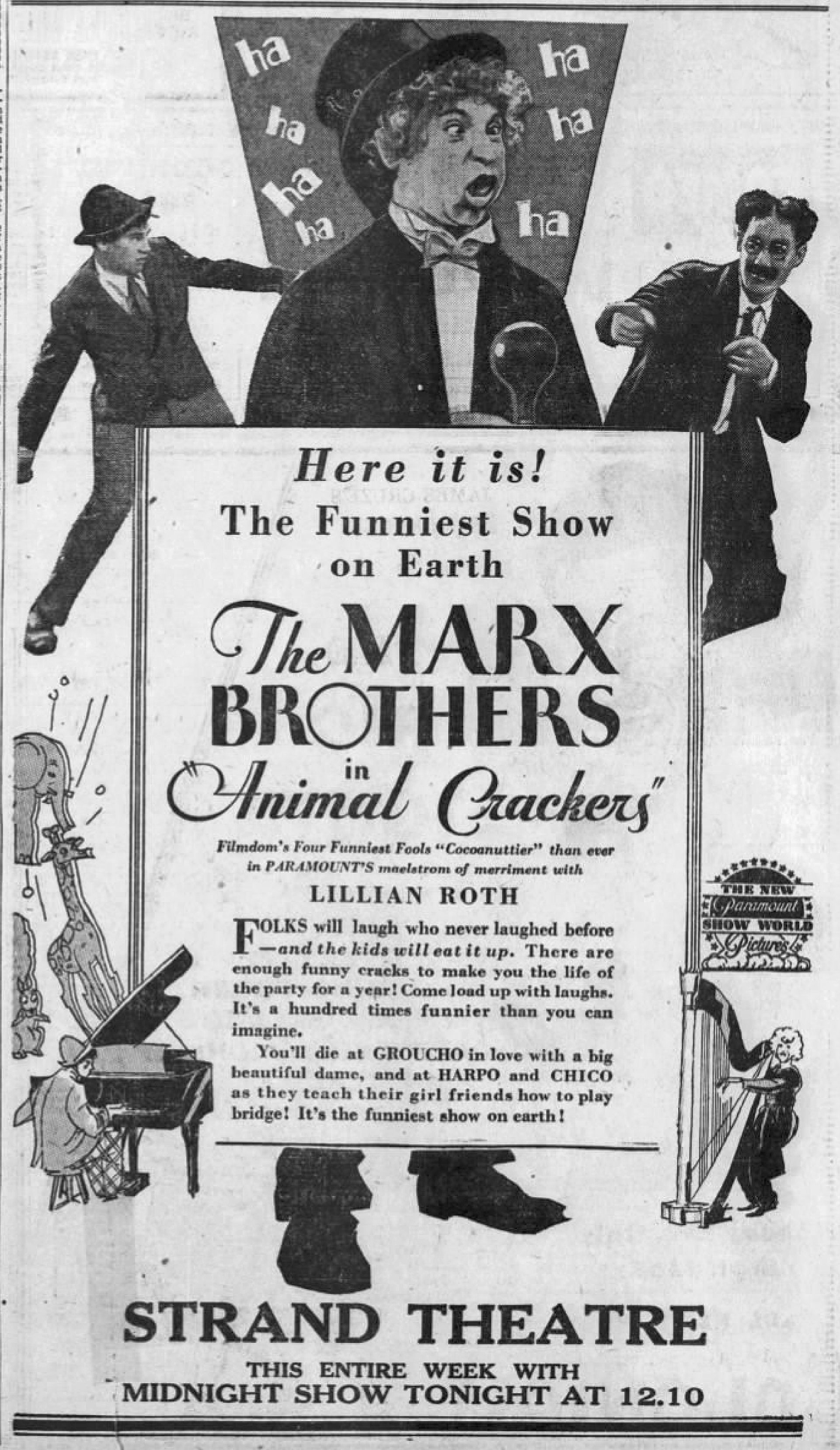
Newspaper ad for Animal Crackers (1930)

Animal Crackers premiered on August 28, 1930, at the Rialto Theatre in New York. It earned an estimated $30,000 ($578,187 in 2025) during its opening weekend in Los Angeles, placing first at the box office. By June 1932, the film had earned $1.5 million ($35.4 million in 2025) in worldwide theatrical rentals.

The film was reissued in 1936, requiring several cuts to comply with the stricter enforcement of the Motion Picture Production Code, which was enacted four years after the film's original release. The reissue ran approximately a minute and a half shorter than the original 1930 cut. Cuts included the line "I think I'll try and make her" from "Hooray for Captain Spaulding"; a scene where Harpo pulls a female guest's slip out from under her dress with his teeth; and Groucho telling a joke about a "shotgun wedding". The censored print remained the only version shown in the United States and most other countries until 2016.

=== Rights issues and 1974 re-release ===
In 1956, the American film rights to Animal Crackers reverted to its original authors—playwrights George S. Kaufman and Morrie Ryskind, and composers Harry Ruby and Bert Kalmar—after Paramount Pictures failed to renegotiate them. Two years later, MCA Inc. acquired the film rights (along with most other pre-1950 Paramount films), but could not secure the stage play rights due to Kaufman's and Ryskind's financial demands. These legal restrictions prevented Animal Crackers from being shown theatrically or broadcast on television in the United States, although it could still be shown outside the restricted area. The last known domestic theatrical release was in 1949 (alongside Duck Soup).

By the 1970s, Animal Crackers could not be seen legally in the United States, although bootleg copies were shown at smaller theaters. After attending one such showing in 1973, Marx Brothers enthusiast Steve Stoliar contacted Groucho, seeking his support for a re-release campaign. On February 7, 1974, Groucho and his assistant Erin Fleming appeared with Stoliar's "Committee for the Re-release of Animal Crackers" (CRAC) at the University of California, Los Angeles, before approximately 200 students, generating over 2,000 petition signatures, attracting reporters, and garnering national media attention. Universal Pictures (which MCA bought in 1962), who owned the film rights, subsequently announced an agreement with the authors and their estates. Test screenings with Groucho's personal appearances in Westwood (May 23, 1974) and New York's Sutton Theater (June 23, 1974) drew enthusiastic crowds. At the latter, a near-riot erupted and a police escort was required. Animal Crackers remained unavailable for television viewing until a special broadcast of the film by CBS on July 21, 1979.

The complete, uncut version of Animal Crackers—which had been available only in an edited form since the 1936 re-release—was restored in 2016 from a 35mm duplicate negative held by the British Film Institute, and given a brief theatrical run. Animal Crackers entered the public domain in the United States in 2026.

== Reception ==
On the review aggregator website Rotten Tomatoes, 97% of 30 critics' reviews are positive. Metacritic, which uses a weighted average, assigned the film a score of 77 out of 100, based on 9 critics, indicating "generally favorable" reviews.

=== Initial response ===
The film was critically praised on its original release. Critic Mordaunt Hall of The New York Times gave it a positive review, describing it as a "further example of amusing nonsense ... This mad affair suits the principals and its absurdities brought forth gales of laughter yesterday afternoon." He added the caveat that "It is, however, the sort of thing that will only appeal to those who revel in the work of these four brothers." Martin Dickstein of the Brooklyn Daily Eagle agreed, calling it an improvement on The Cocoanuts in which the brothers "manage to reach the topmost heights of lunacy", concluding it was "just about the surest cure for the blues that could ever be prescribed."

Animal Crackers also received positive coverage from trade publications. The Film Daily compared it favorably to The Cocoanuts, writing, "The four Marx Brothers are back in the talkers, this time doing better than in their first." Noting that there was not much plot, they observed that "[w]hile most of the repartee is nonsense, it gets the laughs and that's what counts". The Film Spectator gave a dissenting negative review, writing, "I am sorry I saw it."

Sime Silverman in Variety offered a favorable review, commenting on its financial success and implications for the film industry in adapting stage comedy to the screen: "Perhaps a little trade stuff here might serve better than a waste of words to tell about a dough film that's already in it." He predicted that the public would stop going to see touring stage shows, opting instead to wait for the release of the film: "[G]iving Paramount extreme credit for reproducing Animal Crackers intact from the stage. ... That is of such benefit it asks why Animal Crackers on stage at $5.50, when even the ruralites know they will see it later on the screen for 50 or 75c?"

=== Critical reassessment ===
Critics and filmmakers recognized the film's significance in the decades following its initial release. In his 1954 review, French New Wave director François Truffaut called the Marx Brothers the "greatest American comedians of the prewar decade", ranking Animal Crackers alongside A Night at the Opera as their best work. Truffaut further noted that the film had enduring appeal, writing that "[o]ne laughs with this movie as much as one did twenty years ago".

The 1974 re-release of Animal Crackers also prompted critics to reassess the film. In a review for The Los Angeles Free Press, critic Dick Lochte wrote, "With a Marx Brothers movie, success becomes largely a matter of routines. And Animal Crackers provides some of their best." David Sterritt of the Christian Science Monitor noted that even though the film's production was dated, "Animal Crackers is a peach." The review by John J. O'Connor in The New York Times for the film's first television broadcast on CBS in July 1979, described the Marx Brothers routines as "uneven", but still found them funny: "at one point, Groucho turns toward the camera and explains, 'All the jokes can't be good — you got to expect that once in a while.' In Animal Crackers, however, the good ones are very, very good."

The film continues to receive plaudits from reviewers and filmmakers. Director Jim Jarmusch listed the Marx Brothers in an article describing his "guilty pleasures", specifically citing Animal Crackers. Actor and director Stanley Tucci featured the film in a curated selection of works for Time magazine, calling it "one of the greatest movies ever made". Comedian and actor Keegan-Michael Key cited the Marx Brothers as an influence on his work, expressing his preference for Animal Crackers over Duck Soup.

=== Cultural influence ===
Much of the cultural influence of Animal Crackers stems from the character of Captain Spaulding, whose impact extends far beyond the film. (Note: Partial evidence of the interest in Captain Spaulding can be seen in the rumors that have circulated claiming that the character was named after an army officer arrested a few years earlier for selling cocaine to Hollywood residents. Groucho denied these rumors, saying "Contrary to popular mythology, Captain Spaulding's name wasn't taken from that of a Hollywood dope peddler. The name was concocted by two New Yorkers who'd spent little time in California: Kaufman and Ryskind.") One of his most quoted lines, "One morning I shot an elephant in my pajamas. How he got in my pajamas, I don't know", is listed among the AFI's 100 Greatest Movie Quotes.

Captain Spaulding became closely associated with Groucho Marx. Author Glenn Mitchell refers to Spaulding as "the most durable of Groucho's identities". The character was later referenced in Harold Arlen and Yip Harburg's 1939 lyrics to the song "Lydia, the Tattooed Lady". The 1970s TV series MASH and director Rob Zombie's 2003 horror film House of 1000 Corpses both featured characters named Captain Spaulding (spelled 'Spalding' in MASH). "Hooray for Captain Spaulding" and "Hello, I Must Be Going" became Groucho's signature songs. An instrumental version of "Hooray for Captain Spaulding" served as the theme music for most of the run of Groucho's quiz show You Bet Your Life. Director Woody Allen featured a chorus of Groucho impersonators performing the song in French in his 1996 film Everyone Says I Love You. After Groucho's death, talk show host Dick Cavett remarked, "We had lost Captain Spaulding".

Independently of its association with Captain Spaulding, the song "Hello, I Must Be Going" also found its way into other works. It lent its name to a 1982 album by British musician Phil Collins and a 2012 movie by director Todd Louiso. Woody Allen opened his 2009 movie Whatever Works with a clip of Groucho singing it. It also served as a thematic element, as well as the title of an episode, in Oliver Stone's miniseries Wild Palms.

== Home media ==
Animal Crackers was released in 1978 by MCA Home Video on DiscoVision, again on LaserDisc in 1985, and on VHS in 1986. (Note: The copyright year is 1986 on the back of the VHS jacket.) Universal released Animal Crackers on DVD as part of "The Marx Brothers Silver Screen Collection" in 2004. A restored edition on Blu-ray, including previously censored content, was released in 2016 as part of The Marx Brothers Silver Screen Collection Restored Edition. It features commentary by film historian Jeffrey Vance. Both collections include their first five films: The Cocoanuts, Animal Crackers, Monkey Business, Horse Feathers, and Duck Soup.

== See also ==
- List of American comedy films
