= Captain Spaulding =

Marx Brothers fictional character

- Animal Crackers character
- Groucho Marx as Captain Spaulding in the film version of Animal Crackers.
- First appearance: Animal Crackers (musical)
- Last appearance: Animal Crackers (film)
- Portrayed by: Groucho Marx

In-universe information
- Full name: Jeffrey T. Spaulding
- Alias: Geoffrey Spaulding
- Gender: Male
- Title: Captain
- Occupation: Explorer

Captain Jeffrey T. Spaulding is a fictional character in the 1928 Broadway musical Animal Crackers and the 1930 film of the same name. He was originally played by actor Groucho Marx, one of the Marx Brothers, in both productions. Despite his middle name being Edgar, he is known as Jeffrey T. Spaulding; his first name is also spelled as "Geoffrey" in parts of the film.

Spaulding had a theme song entitled "Hooray for Captain Spaulding", composed by Bert Kalmar and Harry Ruby, which all of the guests sing upon his arrival. This song would go on to be associated with Marx for the rest of his life in public; it was the theme for his television series You Bet Your Life and was often played when he was introduced as a guest on television shows. At Marx's Carnegie Hall concert in the early 1970s, accompanist Marvin Hamlisch played the song as Marx made his entrance onstage.

== Role in Animal Crackers ==
Spaulding is a famous explorer on return from a trek across Africa to be the guest of honor at a high-society party given by the wealthy dowager Mrs. Rittenhouse (Margaret Dumont). She frequently claims that Spaulding is one of the most courageous travelers in the world, yet by his own accounts of his safari, he reveals his cowardice. At the party, which is taking place over a weekend, a valuable painting is stolen, and he, along with the police and his secretary Jamison (Zeppo Marx), try to recover it.

One morning, I shot an elephant in my pajamas. How he got in my pajamas I don't know.

— Captain Spaulding

== In popular culture ==
In the 1939 Marx Brothers' film At the Circus, J. Cheever Loophole (also played by Groucho Marx) sings a rendition of "Lydia the Tattooed Lady" and one line references Lydia having a tattoo of Captain Spaulding exploring the Amazon.

The character Capt. Calvin Spaulding from the television show M*A*S*H, played by Loudon Wainwright III, was named after the Marx character.

The horror film character Captain Spaulding, who appears in several works by Rob Zombie (including House of 1000 Corpses, The Devil's Rejects, and 3 from Hell), is named after the Marx character.

A chorus of people disguised as the character appears in Woody Allen's movie Everyone Says I Love You.
