= Everyone Says I Love You =

1996 film by Woody Allen

- Theatrical release poster
- Directed by: Woody Allen
- Written by: Woody Allen
- Produced by: Robert Greenhut
- Starring: Alan Alda; Woody Allen; Drew Barrymore; Lukas Haas; Goldie Hawn; Gaby Hoffmann; Natasha Lyonne; Edward Norton; Natalie Portman; Julia Roberts; Tim Roth; David Ogden Stiers
- Cinematography: Carlo Di Palma
- Edited by: Susan E. Morse
- Music by: Dick Hyman
- Distributed by: Miramax Films
- Release dates: December 8, 1996 (limited Release); January 17, 1997 (United States)
- Running time: 101 minutes
- Country: United States
- Language: English
- Budget: $20 million
- Box office: $9.8 million

Everyone Says I Love You is a 1996 American musical romantic comedy film written and directed by Woody Allen. It stars Alan Alda, Allen, Drew Barrymore, Lukas Haas, Goldie Hawn, Gaby Hoffmann, Natasha Lyonne, Edward Norton, Natalie Portman, Julia Roberts, Tim Roth, and David Ogden Stiers. Set in New York City, Venice, and Paris, it features singing by actors not usually known for musical roles. The film was a box-office bomb, but is among the more critically successful of Allen's films, with Chicago Sun-Times critic Roger Ebert even ranking it as one of Allen's best.

The emotions of an extended upper-class family in Manhattan are followed in song in New York City, Paris, and Venice. Many characters act, interact, and sing in each city. They include young lovers Holden and Skylar, Skylar's parents Bob and Steffi, Steffi's ex-husband Joe, Steffi and Joe's daughter Djuna "DJ" (the film's narrator), a lady Joe meets named Von, and recently released prison inmate Charles Ferry.

== Plot ==
Holden Spence and Skylar Dandridge are an upper-class Manhattan couple ("Just You, Just Me"). Holden enlists Djuna "DJ" Berlin, Skylar's younger half-sister, to help him choose an expensive diamond engagement ring ("My Baby Just Cares for Me"). Skylar wants a "take-charge" kind of guy ("I'm a Dreamer, Aren't We All"). Holden's romantic gesture, at DJ's urging, backfires when Skylar swallows the ring he slipped into her parfait, resulting in a trip to the ER ("Makin' Whoopee").

Bob and Steffi Dandridge, liberal Democratic lawyers ("Looking at You") who have a blended family from previous marriages, are aghast at having a Republican son, Scott, who wants criminals taken off the street and disapproves of Steffi's work rehabilitating felons. Steffi, who volunteers with the American Civil Liberties Union, brings to the engagement party one of her causes, Charles Ferry ("He was an abused child who made one mistake."), who scares guests with accounts of prison stabbings. Initially alarmed by Charles's aggressive passes ("If I Had You"), Skylar eventually falls under his spell ("I've never been kissed by a sociopath before."), breaking up with Holden. Both Steffi and Bob are friendly with Steffi's neurotic ex-husband, Joe Berlin, who lives in Paris and has just broken up with his latest drug-using nymphomaniac girlfriend ("I'm Through with Love"). Steffi unsuccessfully attempts to pair Joe up with a more suitable woman.

On vacation with her father in Venice, Italy, DJ and her friend, whose mother is a psychologist, listen through a hole in the wall on the clientele's therapy sessions. Von Sidell, an art historian, relates to the therapist that she is discontented with her husband, longing for romance and discussing her fantasies. DJ suggests her father "run into" Von jogging and coaches Joe on how to woo her by faking interest in art, music, travel, African daisies, and a hastily bought Parisian garret, and by setting up "coincidental" meetings at a museum and a concert. Convinced she has met the man of her dreams ("All My Life"), the unsuspecting Von leaves her husband Greg for Joe.

DJ falls for a gondolier named Alberto and plans to drop out of college to marry him until she meets her next "flame": Ken Risley, a student at Columbia University, where his uncle teaches ("Cuddle up a Little Closer, Lovey Mine"). She then falls for a rapper in New York, followed by a dashing Parisian. Competitive sisters Lane and Laura, DJ's half-sisters, both have crushes on a local lad, heir to the Vandermost millions, but 14-year-old Laura is heartbroken when Vandermost falls for Lane ("I'm Through with Love"). Grandpa, an 88-year-old foot fetishist with dementia, occasionally wanders off, corralled by Freda the maid, who DJ jokingly claims was Hitler's maid at Berchtesgaden ("It's Bavarian pasta, it doesn't need any sauce; Italian pasta needs sauce. The Italians were weak!"). At Grandpa's funeral, the corpses at the chapel sing and dance to "Enjoy Yourself (It's Later than You Think)".

Skylar encourages ex-convict Charles to study law, but he instead involves the unwitting Skylar in a grocery store robbery with his gang. Begging to be let out of the getaway car, Skylar successfully escapes and eventually reconciles at a Halloween party with a forgiving Holden ("Chiquita Banana"). This time Skylar swallows the engagement ring Holden has slipped in a box of Cracker Jack. Sometime later, Scott is diagnosed with a blockage in an artery that has restricted the flow of oxygen to his brain, but once it successfully resolves, he immediately resigns from the Young Republicans Club and begins espousing left-wing causes. Having experienced all her fantasies with the man of her dreams, Von no longer yearns for them; she leaves Joe to return to Greg.

The family travels to Paris for Christmas and attends a Groucho Marx-themed New Years party ("Hooray for Captain Spaulding"). When Bob suffers a cold, Steffi attends with Joe; they reminisce, acknowledging that although their marriage has failed ("I'm Through With Love"), they still care about each other. Although Steffi loves Bob "wholeheartedly", she shares a mutually supportive kiss with Joe before encouraging him to find someone suitable. The family dances to "Everyone Says I love You" as DJ romances a dance partner in a Harpo Marx costume.

== Cast ==
- Alan Alda as Bob Dandridge
- Woody Allen as Joe Berlin
- Drew Barrymore as Skylar Dandridge (singing voice dubbed by Olivia Hayman)
- Lukas Haas as Scott Dandridge
- Goldie Hawn as Steffi Dandridge
- Gaby Hoffmann as Lane Dandridge
- Natasha Lyonne as Djuna "D.J." Berlin
- Edward Norton as Holden Spence
- Natalie Portman as Laura Dandridge
- Julia Roberts as Von Sidell
- Tim Roth as Charles Ferry
- David Ogden Stiers as Arnold Spence
- Itzhak Perlman as himself
- Edward Hibbert as a Harry Winston Salesman
- Patrick Cranshaw as Grandpa
- Billy Crudup as Ken Risley
- Robert Knepper as Greg
- Scotty Bloch as Lynn Spence
- Isiah Whitlock Jr. as Cop
- Kevin Hagan as Doorman
- Navah Perlman as Pianist
- Waltrudis Buck as Psychiatrist
- Christy Carlson Romano as a Trick or Treat Child
- Tim Jerome as X-ray Room Doctor
- Arlene Martell as a Nurse
- Singers: Helen Miles, Arlene Martell, Emily Bindiger, Cindy Cobitt, Al Dana, Kevin DeSimone, Paul Evans, Chrissy Faith, Jeff Lyons, Michael Mark, Jenna Miles, Robert Ragaini, Lenny Roberts, Annette Sanders, Terry Textor, Vaneese Thomas and Ashley H. Wilkinson

== Music ==
The film uses classic songs for each scene, in some cases with unexpected dance routines.

1. "Just You, Just Me" (Jesse Greer, Raymond Klages) — Edward Norton
2. "My Baby Just Cares for Me" (Walter Donaldson, Gus Kahn) — Edward Norton/Natasha Lyonne
3. "Recurrence/I'm a Dreamer, Aren't We All" (Ray Henderson, Lew Brown, B.G. DeSylva) — Dick Hyman/Olivia Hayman
4. "Makin' Whoopee" (Donaldson, Kahn) — Tim Jerome
5. "Venetian Scenes/I'm Through with Love" (Kahn, Matt Malneck, Fud Livingston) — Dick Hyman/Woody Allen
6. "All My Life" (Sam Stept, Sidney Mitchell) — Julia Roberts
7. "Just You, Just Me" (Salsa Version) (Greer, Klages) — Dick Hyman and the New York Studio Players
8. "Cuddle Up a Little Closer" (Karl Hoschna, Otto Harbach) — Billy Crudup/Sanjeev Ramabhadran
9. "Looking at You" (Cole Porter) — Alan Alda
10. "Recurrence/If I Had You" (Ted Shapiro, Jimmy Campbell, Reg Connelly) — Dick Hyman/Tim Roth
11. "Enjoy Yourself (It's Later than You Think)" (Carl Sigman, Herb Magidson) — Patrick Crenshaw
12. "Chiquita Banana" (Leonard McKenzie, Garth Montgomery, William Wirges) — Christy Carlson Romano
13. "Hooray for Captain Spaulding/Vive Le Capitaine Spaulding" (Bert Kalmar, Harry Ruby, Philippe Videcoq) — The Helen Miles Singers
14. "I'm Through with Love" (Kahn, Malneck, Livingston) — Goldie Hawn/Edward Norton
15. "Everyone Says I Love You" (Kalmar, Ruby) — The Helen Miles Singers

Most of the performers sing in their own voices, with the exception of Drew Barrymore, who convinced Allen that her singing was too awful even for the "realistic singing voice" concept he was going for. Her voice was dubbed by Olivia Hayman. Allen asked Goldie Hawn, a gifted singer, to sing "poorly" in order to achieve the "realistic" sound he was going for.

The title song was written by Bert Kalmar and Harry Ruby and was used as a recurring theme song in the Marx Brothers film Horse Feathers (1932). Allen is a well-known Groucho Marx fan. Marx's theme song from Animal Crackers (1930) "Hooray for Captain Spaulding" is featured, sung in French by a chorus of Groucho Marxes. The songs, film score, and subsequent album were recorded, mixed, and co-produced by Dick Hyman and Roy Yokelson.

== Reception ==
=== Box office ===
On its opening weekend, the film grossed $131,678 from three theaters, with an average of $43,892 per theater. It ended its run with $9.8 million.

=== Critical response ===
The film was well received. On the review aggregator website Rotten Tomatoes, the film holds an approval rating of 77% based on 44 reviews, with an average rating of 7.2/10. The website's critics consensus reads, "A likable, infectious musical, Woody Allen's Everyone Says I Love You is sometimes uneven but always toe-tapping and fun." Janet Maslin wrote a strongly positive review in The New York Times, describing the film as "a delightful and witty compendium of [Allen's] favorite things." Among the film's strongest detractors was Jonathan Rosenbaum, who described it as "creepy" and claimed, "in this characterless world of Manhattan-Venice-Paris, where love consists only of self-validation, and political convictions of any kind are attributable to either hypocrisy or a brain condition, the me-first nihilism of Allen's frightened worldview is finally given full exposure, and it's a grisly thing to behold."

=== Accolades ===
The film was nominated for Best Motion Picture – Musical or Comedy at the 54th Golden Globes.
