= Why a Duck? =

Marx Brothers comedy routine centered on an accidental pun

Chico and Groucho Marx during the classic "Why a Duck?" scene from The Cocoanuts.

"Why a Duck?" is a comedy routine featured in the Marx Brothers movie The Cocoanuts (1929). In a scene in which Groucho and Chico are discussing a map, Groucho mentions the presence of a viaduct between the mainland and a peninsula. Chico, who is playing the role of an immigrant with poor English skills, replies "Why a duck?" This leads into a long schtick with Chico responding "Why a no chicken?", "I catch ona why a horse", and so forth.

"Why a Duck?" is a touchstone scene for Marx Brothers fans, as evidenced by Richard Anobile's book of the same name (featuring a foreword by Groucho) which focuses on the minutiae of the Marx Brothers' routines.

== Duck as a theme ==
The duck is a running gag throughout the Marxes' and especially Groucho's career. His signature walk was called "the duck walk" and on Groucho's television program You Bet Your Life a stuffed duck made up to resemble Groucho would drop from the ceiling to give contestants money if they said the day's secret word. Reportedly, when literally asked "why a duck" was chosen for the gag, Groucho answered "because a duck is such a silly animal". Ducks are the only animals that perform lines in the song "Everyone Says I Love You" in the Marx Brothers' film Horse Feathers (1932). Their next film was called Duck Soup (1933), although no ducks or soup appear anywhere in the film except in the title sequence. In A Night At The Opera (1935), Groucho orders a duck egg for breakfast.

== Cultural references to the "why a duck?" routine ==
- "Why A Duck?" (radio program)

== See also ==
- Inherently funny word
- Duck: cultural references
