= Morrie Ryskind =

American dramatist (1895–1985)

- Born: Morris Ryskind; October 20, 1895; Brooklyn, New York, U.S.
- Died: August 24, 1985 (aged 89); Washington, D.C., U.S.
- Education: Columbia University
- Occupations: Dramatist; screenwriter; lyricist; newspaper columnist
- Spouse: Mary House (1929–1985)
- Children: 2
- Writing career
- Years active: 1929–1972

Morris Ryskind (October 20, 1895 – August 24, 1985) was an American dramatist, lyricist and writer of theatrical productions and movies who became a conservative political activist later in life.

== Life and career ==
Ryskind was born in Brooklyn, New York, the son of Russian Jewish immigrants Ida (Edelson) and Abraham Ryskind. He attended Columbia University but was suspended shortly before he was due to graduate after he called university president Nicholas Murray Butler "Czar Nicholas" in the pages of the humor magazine Jester in 1917. Ryskind was criticizing Butler for refusing to allow Ilya Tolstoy to speak on campus.

From 1927 to 1945, Ryskind was author of numerous scripts and musical lyrics for Broadway productions and Hollywood films, and he later directed several productions. He collaborated with George S. Kaufman on several Broadway hits. In 1933, he earned the Pulitzer Prize for drama for the Broadway production Of Thee I Sing, a musical written in collaboration with composer George Gershwin.

Ryskind wrote or cowrote several Marx Brothers stage musicals and screenplays, including the book for the Broadway musical Animal Crackers (1929) (with Kaufman), as well as the screenplays for the film versions of The Cocoanuts (1929) and Animal Crackers (1930).

Ryskind and Kaufman collaborated again on the screenplay for the Marx Brothers first film for Metro-Goldwyn-Mayer, A Night at the Opera (1935). The film was later selected by the American Film Institute as among the top 100 comedy films. In working on that script, Ryskind was heavily involved in the "cleanup process", observing the brothers repeatedly perform sections of the screenplay before live audiences on a nationwide tour to determine which lines worked and which did not. In an interview with Richard J. Anobile in The Marx Brothers Scrapbook, Groucho Marx said that he was so appalled by an early draft of the script, which was written by Bert Kalmar and Harry Ruby, that he screamed "Why fuck around with second-rate talent, get Kaufman and Ryskind [to write the screenplay]!"

Ryskind also adapted the hit Broadway play Room Service, into a suitable Marx Brothers screenplay for the 1938 film version.

During that period, Ryskind was twice nominated for an Academy Award for his part in writing the films My Man Godfrey (starring Carole Lombard, 1936) and Stage Door (starring Katharine Hepburn, 1937). Later, he wrote the screenplay for the successful Penny Serenade, wrote the stage musical Louisiana Purchase (which soon became a film starring Bob Hope) and supervised the production of The Lady Comes Across.

=== Political activism ===
For many years, Ryskind had been a member of the Socialist Party of America, and during the 1930s he participated in party-sponsored activities, even performing sketches at antiwar events, but he split with the party's Old Guard faction led by Louis Waldman. His politics soon moved to the political right. In 1940, Ryskind abandoned the Democratic Party, and he opposed President Franklin Delano Roosevelt's pursuit of a third term, writing the campaign song for that year's Republican Party presidential nominee Wendell Willkie. He maintained some ties to the Socialist Party throughout the 1940s and served as a vice chairman of the Keep America Out of War Congress.

Ryskind became a friend to writers Max Eastman, Ayn Rand, John Dos Passos, Suzanne La Follette and Raymond Moley. Later, he would become a friend to William F. Buckley Jr. and future president Ronald Reagan. In 1947, he appeared before the House Un-American Activities Committee as a "friendly witness" at hearings that resulted in the blacklisting of the "Hollywood Ten," including Ring Lardner Jr. and Dalton Trumbo. Ryskind never sold another script after that appearance, and he believed that his appearance before HUAC was responsible, although there is no direct evidence of an organized campaign against the "friendly witnesses."

In the 1950s, Ryskind contributed articles to The Freeman, In 1954, he was also a board member of the American Jewish League Against Communism.

Ryskind lent money to Buckley to help start The National Review, which began publication in 1955, another journal to which he was an early contributor. Ryskind briefly joined the John Birch Society but soon disassociated himself from the group after it began to claim that Roosevelt, Harry S. Truman and Dwight D. Eisenhower were part of the Soviet conspiracy.

From 1960 to 1971, Ryskind wrote a feature column for the Los Angeles Times that promoted conservative ideas. His son Allan H. Ryskind was the longtime editor of the conservative weekly Human Events.

The elder Ryskind's autobiography I Shot an Elephant in My Pajamas: The Morrie Ryskind Story details his adventures from Broadway to Hollywood as well as his conversion to conservative politics.

== Stage productions ==
- Merry-Go-Round (1927, with Howard Dietz to music by Henry Souvaine and Jay Gorney)
- Animal Crackers (1929, with George S. Kaufman to music and lyrics by Bert Kalmar and Harry Ruby)
- Ned Wayburn's Gambols (1929, lyricist with music by Walter G. Samuels)
- Strike up the Band (1930, bookwriter with music by George Gershwin and lyrics by Ira Gershwin)
- The Gang's All Here (1931, contributing bookwriter)
- Of Thee I Sing (1931, with George S. Kaufman to music by George Gershwin and lyrics by Ira Gershwin) - Pulitzer Prize for Drama)
- Pardon My English (1933, with Herbert Fields to music by George Gershwin and lyrics by Ira Gershwin)
- Let 'Em Eat Cake (1933 sequel to Of Thee I Sing, with George S. Kaufman to music by George Gershwin and lyrics by Ira Gershwin)
- Louisiana Purchase (1941, bookwriter to music and lyrics by Irving Berlin, later, a film starring Bob Hope)
- The Lady Comes Across (1942, theatre director)

== Filmography ==
- The Cocoanuts (1929, starring the Marx Brothers)
- Animal Crackers (1930, starring the Marx Brothers)
- A Night at the Opera (1935, starring the Marx Brothers)
- My Man Godfrey (1936) - Oscar nomination
- Stage Door (1937) - Oscar nomination
- Room Service (1938, starring the Marx Brothers)
- Man About Town (1939)
- Penny Serenade (1941)
- Claudia (1943)
- Where Do We Go From Here? (1945)
- It's in the Bag! (1945), starring Fred Allen

== Bibliography ==
- George S. Kaufman et al., Kaufman & Co.: Broadway Comedies, Laurence Maslon, ed. (New York: The Library of America, 2004 ISBN 1-931082-67-7; includes Animal Crackers and Of Thee I Sing)
- Animal Crackers (1928, with George S. Kaufman, New York: Samuel French's Musical Library, 1984 ISBN 978-0573681370)
- Of Thee I Sing (1931, with George S. Kaufman and Ira Gershwin, New York: Knopf. 1932; Samuel French's Musical Library, 1963 ISBN 978-0573680373)
- Let 'Em Eat Cake (1933, with George S. Kaufman and Ira Gershwin, New York: Knopf. 1933)
- I Shot an Elephant in My Pajamas: the Morrie Ryskind Story (with John H. M. Roberts, Lafayette, LA: Huntington House, 1994 ISBN 1-56384-000-6)
- Nicholas Miraculous: The Amazing Career of the Redoubtable Dr. Nicholas Murray Butler, Michael Rosenthal (Columbia University Press, 2006 ISBN 978-0-231-17421-3)

== See also ==
- List of Russian Academy Award winners and nominees
