= Margaret Dumont =

American actress (1882–1965)

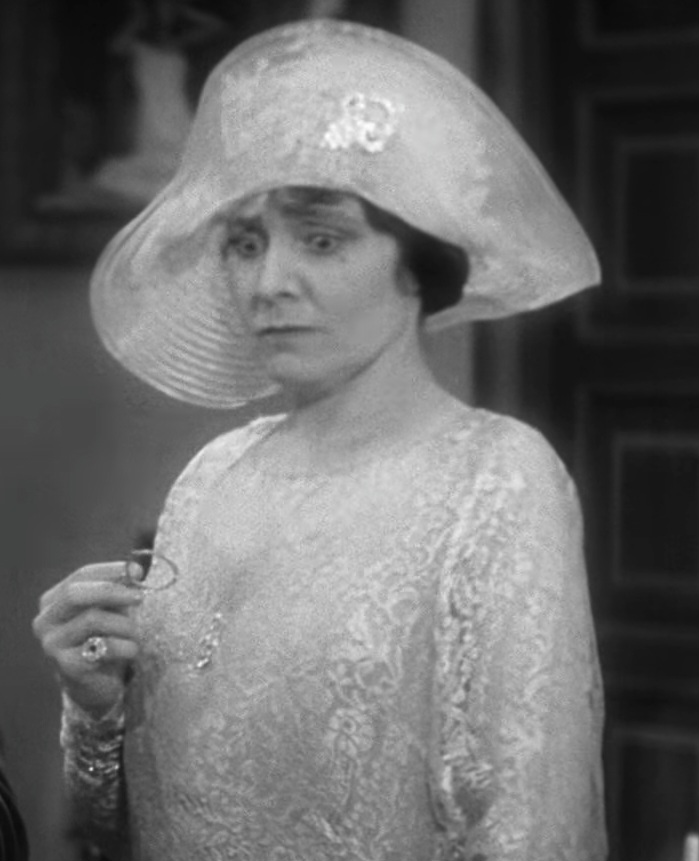
- Dumont as Mrs. Potter in The Cocoanuts (1929)
- Born: Daisy Juliette Baker; October 20, 1882; Brooklyn, New York, U.S.
- Died: March 6, 1965 (aged 82); Hollywood, California, U.S.
- Resting place: Chapel of the Pines Crematory
- Occupation: Actress
- Years active: 1902–1965
- Spouse(s): John Moller, Jr. (m. 1910; died 1918)

Margaret Dumont (born Daisy Juliette Baker; October 20, 1882 – March 6, 1965) (Note: Many sources, including obituaries, incorrectly give Dumont's birth year as 1889 or 1890.) was an American stage and film actress. She is best remembered as the comic foil to the Marx Brothers in seven of their films; Groucho Marx called her "practically the fifth Marx brother." (Note: There were five Marx brothers - and a sixth, who died as a child - but only four of them performed together on film.)

== Early life ==
Dumont was born Daisy Juliette Baker in Brooklyn, New York, the daughter of William and Harriet Anna (née Harvey) Baker. Her mother was a music teacher and encouraged Daisy's singing career from an early age.

== Career ==
Dumont trained as an operatic singer and actress in her teens and began performing on stage in the U.S. and Europe, at first under the name Daisy Dumont and later as Margaret (or Marguerite: French for Daisy) Dumont. Her theatrical debut was in Sleeping Beauty and the Beast at the Chestnut Theater in Philadelphia; in August 1902, two months before her 20th birthday, she appeared as a singer/comedian in a vaudeville act in Atlantic City. The dark-haired soubrette, described by a theater reviewer as a "statuesque beauty," attracted notice later that decade for her vocal and comedic talents in The Girl Behind the Counter (1908), The Belle of Brittany (1909), and The Summer Widower (1910).

In 1910, she married millionaire sugar heir and industrialist John Moller, Jr., and retired from stage work, although she had a small uncredited role as an aristocrat in a 1917 film adaptation of A Tale of Two Cities. The marriage was childless.

After her husband's sudden death during the 1918 influenza pandemic, Dumont reluctantly returned to the Broadway stage, and soon gained a strong reputation in musical comedies. She never remarried. Her Broadway career included roles in the musical comedies and plays The Fan (1921), Go Easy, Mabel (1922), The Rise of Rosie O'Reilly (1923/24), and The Fourflusher (1925); she had an uncredited role in the 1923 film Enemies of Women.

=== With the Marx Brothers ===
In 1925, theatrical producer Sam H. Harris recommended Dumont to the Marx Brothers and writer George S. Kaufman for the role of the stuffy rich widow Mrs. Potter in the Marxes' Broadway production of The Cocoanuts. In their next Broadway show, Animal Crackers, which opened in October 1928, Dumont again was cast as foil and straight woman Mrs. Rittenhouse, another wealthy, high society widow. She appeared with the Marxes in the screen versions of both The Cocoanuts (1929) and Animal Crackers (1930).

In the Marx Brothers films, Dumont invariably portrayed rich widows whom Groucho would alternately insult and romance for their money:

- The Cocoanuts (1929) as Mrs. Potter
- Animal Crackers (1930) as Mrs. Rittenhouse
- Duck Soup (1933) as Mrs. Gloria Teasdale
- A Night at the Opera (1935) as Mrs. Claypool
- A Day at the Races (1937) as Mrs. Emily Upjohn
- At the Circus (1939) as Mrs. Susanna Dukesbury
- The Big Store (1941) as Martha Phelps

Her role as the excitable, hypochondriacal Mrs. Upjohn in A Day at the Races brought her a Best Supporting Actress Award from the Screen Actors Guild; film critic Cecilia Ager suggested that a monument be erected in honor of Dumont's courage and steadfastness in the face of the Marx Brothers' antics. Groucho once said that because of their frequent movie appearances, many people believed they were married in real life.

An exchange from Duck Soup:

Groucho: I suppose you'll think me a sentimental old fluff, but would you mind giving me a lock of your hair?
Dumont: A lock of my hair? Why, I had no idea you ...
Groucho: I'm letting you off easy. I was gonna ask for the whole wig.

Dumont also endured dialogue about her characters' (and thus her own) stout build, as with these lines also from Duck Soup:

Dumont: I've sponsored your appointment because I feel you are the most able statesman in all Freedonia.
Groucho: Well, that covers a lot of ground. Say, you cover a lot of ground yourself. You'd better beat it; I hear they're going to tear you down and put up an office building where you're standing.

and:

Groucho: Why don't you marry me?
Dumont: Why, marry you?
Groucho: You take me and I'll take a vacation. I'll need a vacation if we're going to get married. Married! I can see you right now in the kitchen, bending over a hot stove. But I can't see the stove.

Or her age (in their last film pairing, The Big Store):

Dumont: ...I'm afraid after we're married awhile, a beautiful, young girl will come along and you'll forget all about me.
Groucho: Don't be silly. I'll write you twice a week.

Dumont's character would usually give a short, startled or confused reaction to these insults, but always appeared to forget them quickly.

In his one-man show at New York's Carnegie Hall in 1972, Groucho mentioned Dumont's name and got a burst of applause. He falsely informed the audience that she rarely understood the humor of their scenes and would ask him, "Why are they laughing, Julie?" ("Julie" being her nickname for Julius, Groucho's birth name). Dumont was so important to the success of the Marx Brothers films that she was one of the few people Groucho mentioned in his short acceptance speech for an honorary Oscar in 1974. (The others were Harpo and Chico, their mother Minnie, and Groucho's companion Erin Fleming. Zeppo and Gummo Marx, who were both alive at the time, were not mentioned, though Jack Lemmon, who introduced Groucho, mentioned all four brothers who appeared with Dumont on film.)

In most of her interviews and press profiles, Dumont preserved the myth of her on-screen character: the wealthy, regal woman who never quite understood the jokes. However, in a 1942 interview with the World Wide Features press syndicate, Dumont said, "Scriptwriters build up to a laugh but they don't allow any pause for it. That's where I come in. I ad lib—it doesn't matter what I say—just to kill a few seconds so you can enjoy the gag. I have to sense when the big laughs will come and fill in, or the audience will drown out the next gag with its own laughter. ... I'm not a stooge, I'm a straight lady. There's an art to playing straight. You must build up your man, but never top him, never steal the laughs from him."

For decades, film critics and historians have theorized that because Dumont never broke character or smiled at Groucho's jokes, she did not "get" the Marxes' humor. On the contrary, Dumont, a seasoned stage professional, maintained her "straight" appearance to enhance the Marxes' comedy. In 1965, shortly before Dumont's death, The Hollywood Palace featured a recreation of "Hooray for Captain Spaulding" (from the Marxes' 1930 film Animal Crackers) in which Dumont can be seen laughing at Groucho's ad-libs—proving that she got the jokes.

Writing about Dumont's importance as a comic foil in 1998, film critic Andrew Sarris wrote "Groucho's confrontations with Miss Dumont seem much more the heart of the Marxian matter today than the rather loose rapport among the three brothers themselves."

Dumont's acting style, especially in her early films, reflected the classic theatrical tradition of projecting to the back row (for example, trilling the "r" for emphasis). She had a classical operatic singing voice that screenwriters eagerly used to their advantage.

=== Other roles ===
Dumont appeared in 57 films, including some minor silent work beginning with A Tale of Two Cities (1917). Her first feature was the Marx Brothers' The Cocoanuts (1929), in which she played Mrs. Potter, the role she played in the stage version from which the film was adapted. She also made some television appearances, including a guest-starring role with Estelle Winwood on The Donna Reed Show in the episode "Miss Lovelace Comes to Tea" (1959).

Dumont, usually playing her dignified dowager character, appeared with other film comedians and actors, including Wheeler and Woolsey and George "Spanky" McFarland (Kentucky Kernels, 1934); Joe Penner (Here, Prince 1932, and The Life of the Party 1937); Lupe Vélez (High Flyers, 1937); W.C. Fields (Never Give a Sucker an Even Break, 1941, and Tales of Manhattan 1942); Laurel and Hardy (The Dancing Masters, 1943); Red Skelton (Bathing Beauty, 1944); Danny Kaye (Up in Arms, 1944); Jack Benny (The Horn Blows at Midnight, 1945); George "Gabby" Hayes (Sunset in El Dorado, 1945); Abbott and Costello (Little Giant, 1946); and Tom Poston (Zotz!, 1962).

Turner Classic Movies’ website says of High Flyers: "The surprise... is seeing [Dumont] play a somewhat daffy matron, more Billie Burke than typical Margaret Dumont. As the lady who's into crystal gazing and dotes on her kleptomaniac bull terrier, she brings a discreetly screwball touch to the proceedings."

She also appeared on television with Martin and Lewis in The Colgate Comedy Hour (December 1951).

Dumont played dramatic parts in films including Youth on Parole (1937), Dramatic School (1938), Stop, You're Killing Me (1952), Three for Bedroom C (1952), and Shake, Rattle & Rock! (1956).

Her last film role was that of Shirley MacLaine's mother, Mrs. Foster, in What a Way to Go! (1964).

On February 26, 1965, eight days before her death, Dumont made her final acting appearance on the television program The Hollywood Palace, where she was reunited with Groucho, the week's guest host. They performed material from Captain Spaulding's introductory scene in Animal Crackers, including the song "Hooray for Captain Spaulding." The videotaped show was broadcast by ABC on April 17, 1965.

== Death ==
Margaret Dumont died from a heart attack on March 6, 1965. She was cremated and her ashes were interred at the Chapel of the Pines Crematory in Los Angeles. She was 82, although many obituaries erroneously gave her age as 75.

In 2023, Dumont's cremains were removed from non-public storage in the basement of the Chapel of the Pines after 58 years to a publicly accessible niche with a new bronze plaque in the chapel columbarium.

== Partial filmography ==
| Year | Film | Role | Notes |
|---|---|---|---|
| 1923 | Enemies of Women | French Beauty | Uncredited |
| 1929 | The Cocoanuts | Mrs. Potter | |
| 1930 | Animal Crackers | Mrs. Rittenhouse | |
| 1931 | The Girl Habit | Blanche Ledyard | |
| 1933 | Duck Soup | Mrs. Gloria Teasdale | |
| 1934 | Fifteen Wives | Sybilla Crum | |
| 1934 | Gridiron Flash | Mrs. Fields | |
| 1934 | Kentucky Kernels | Mrs. Baxter | |
| 1935 | A Night at the Opera | Mrs. Claypool | |
| 1936 | Anything Goes | Mrs. Wentworth | |
| 1936 | Song and Dance Man | Mrs. Whitney | |
| 1937 | A Day at the Races | Mrs. Emily Upjohn | |
| 1937 | The Life of the Party | Mrs. Penner | |
| 1937 | Youth on Parole | Mrs. Abernathy | |
| 1937 | High Flyers | Martha Arlington | |
| 1937 | Dramatic School | Pantomime teacher | |
| 1938 | Wise Girl | Mrs. Bell-Rivington | |
| 1939 | At the Circus | Mrs. Suzanna Dukesbury | |
| 1941 | The Big Store | Martha Phelps | |
| 1941 | For Beauty's Sake | Mrs. Franklin Evans | |
| 1941 | Never Give a Sucker an Even Break | Mrs. Hemogloben | |
| 1942 | Sing Your Worries Away | Landlady Flo Faulkner | |
| 1942 | Born to Sing | Mrs. E.V. Lawson | |
| 1942 | Rhythm Parade | Ophelia MacDougal | |
| 1943 | The Dancing Masters | Louise Harlan | |
| 1944 | Up in Arms | Mrs. Willoughby | |
| 1944 | Seven Days Ashore | Mrs. Croxton-Lynch | |
| 1944 | Bathing Beauty | Mrs. Allenwood | |
| 1945 | The Horn Blows at Midnight | Mme. Traviata / Miss Rodholder | |
| 1945 | Diamond Horseshoe | Mrs. Standish | |
| 1945 | Sunset in El Dorado | Aunt Dolly / Aunt Arabella | |
| 1946 | Little Giant | Mrs. Henrickson | |
| 1946 | Susie Steps Out | Mrs. Starr | |
| 1952 | Three for Bedroom "C" | Mrs. Agnes Hawthorne | |
| 1952 | Stop, You're Killing Me | Mrs. Harriet Whitelaw | |
| 1956 | Shake, Rattle & Rock! | Georgianna Fitzdingle | |
| 1958 | Auntie Mame | | Uncredited |
| 1962 | Zotz! | Persephone Updike | |
| 1964 | What a Way to Go! | Mrs. Foster | |
