= Lydia the Tattooed Lady =

1939 song written by Yip Harburg and Harold Arlen

"Lydia, the Tattooed Lady" is a 1939 song written by Yip Harburg and Harold Arlen. It first appeared in the Marx Brothers film At the Circus (1939) and became one of Groucho Marx's signature tunes. It subsequently appeared in the movie The Philadelphia Story (1940), sung by Virginia Weidler as Dinah Lord.

The complex lyrics by Harburg – with clever rhymes such as "Lydia/encyclopedia" and "Amazon/pajamas on" – were inspired by W. S. Gilbert. Harburg made many contemporary references to topical personalities such as Grover Whalen, who opened the 1939 New York World's Fair.

Among the items, persons, and scenes tattooed on Lydia's body are the Battle of Waterloo (on her back), The Wreck of the Hesperus (beside it), the red, white and blue (above them); the cities of Kankakee and "Paree", Washington Crossing the Delaware, President Andrew Jackson, Niagara, Alcatraz, Buffalo Bill, Captain Spaulding (Groucho's character in Animal Crackers) exploring the Amazon, Lady Godiva (but with her pajamas on), Grover Whalen, the Trylon, Treasure Island, Nijinsky, Social Security Number (behind her earlobe) and a fleet of ships (on her hips). Alternative lyrics suggest that Lydia's buttocks have tattoos of a map and a caricature of Hitler: "When she stands, the world grows littler. When she sits, she sits on Hitler."

The song was parodied by the Capitol Steps as "Libya, Oh Libya" (the Terrorist Nation) on their album Thank God I'm a Contra Boy and was featured in the 1991 film The Fisher King in reference to Amanda Plummer's character.

== See also ==
- Tattooed lady
