= At the Circus =

1939 Marx Brothers film by Edward Buzzell

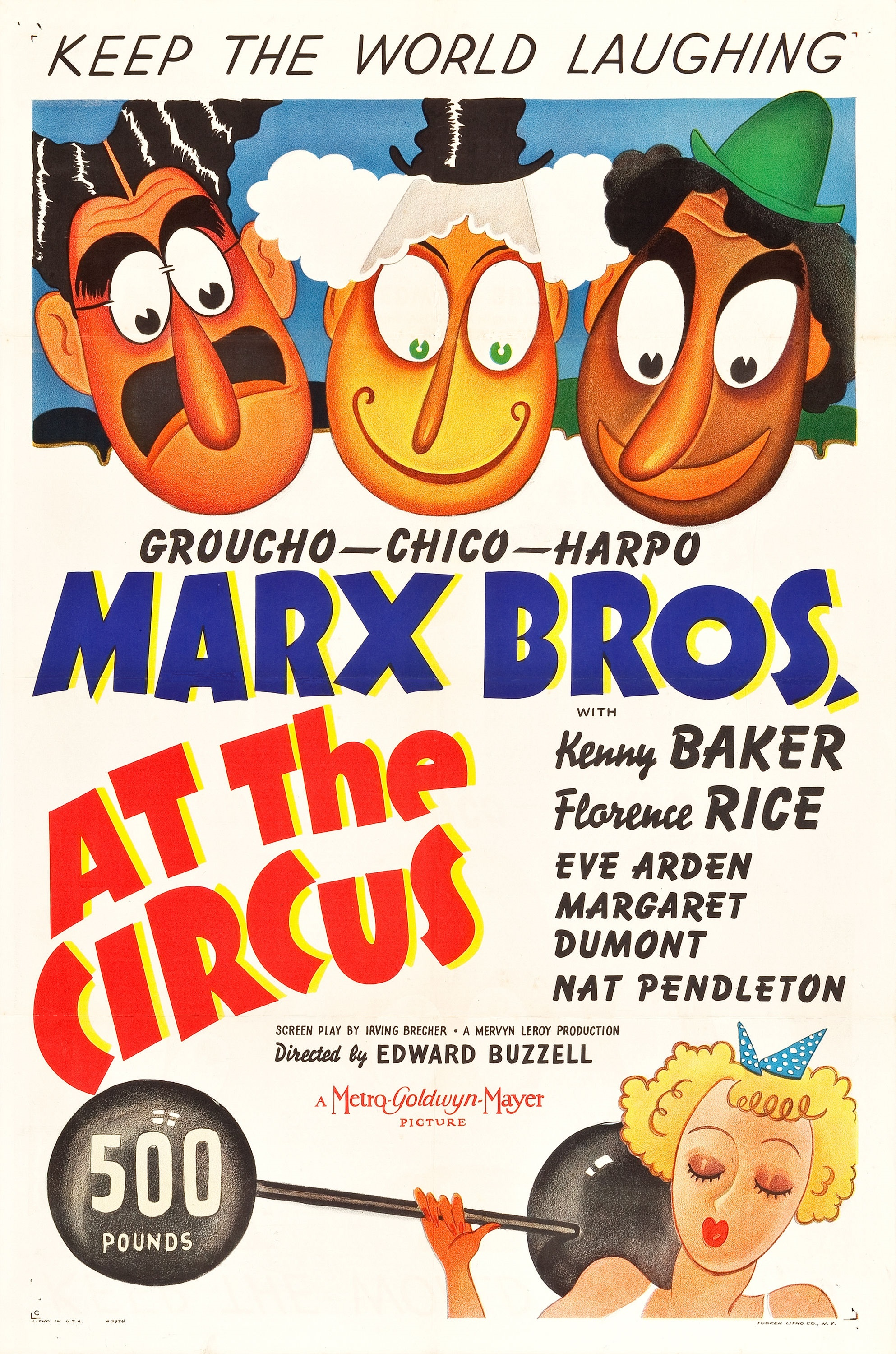
- Directed by: Edward Buzzell
- Written by: Irving Brecher; Buster Keaton (uncredited); Laurence Stallings (uncredited)
- Produced by: Mervyn LeRoy
- Starring: Groucho Marx; Chico Marx; Harpo Marx; Florence Rice; Kenny Baker; Margaret Dumont; Eve Arden
- Cinematography: Leonard M. Smith
- Edited by: William H. Terhune
- Music by: Franz Waxman
- Production company: Metro-Goldwyn-Mayer
- Distributed by: Loew's, Inc.
- Release date: October 20, 1939
- Running time: 87 minutes
- Country: United States
- Language: English

At the Circus is a 1939 comedy film starring the Marx Brothers (Groucho, Harpo and Chico) released by Metro-Goldwyn-Mayer in which they help save a circus from bankruptcy. The film contains Groucho Marx's classic rendition of "Lydia the Tattooed Lady". The supporting cast includes Florence Rice, Kenny Baker, Margaret Dumont, and Eve Arden. The songs, including "Lydia the Tattooed Lady", "Two Blind Loves", and "Step Up and Take a Bow", were written by the team of Harold Arlen and Yip Harburg, who'd recently furnished the songs for another MGM film that same year, The Wizard of Oz.

== Plot ==
Goliath, the circus strongman and the midget, Little Professor Atom, both employed by Wilson's Wonder Circus, are accomplices of villanous businessman John Carter in taking over the circus from owner Jeff Wilson. Julie Randall, Jeff's girlfriend, performs a horse act in the circus. Jeff has hidden $10,000 in cash (equal to $231,459 today), which he owes to Carter, in the cage of Gibraltar the gorilla. When Jeff goes to retrieve the money to give to Carter from Gibraltar's cage on the circus train, Carter has Goliath and Atom knock Jeff unconscious and steal the $10,000.

Jeff's friend and circus employee, Antonio 'Tony' Pirelli, summons attorney J. Cheever Loophole to investigate the situation. Loophole discovers Carter's moll, Peerless Pauline (whose circus act consists of walking upside-down with suction cups on her shoes), is hiding the money, but she outwits him and he fails to retrieve it. Later, Tony and Punchy search Goliath's stateroom on the circus train for the money, but are unsuccessful.

With Carter about to foreclose on the circus, Loophole discovers that Jeff's aunt is the wealthy Mrs. Susanna Dukesbury, and he tricks her into paying $10,000 for the Wilson Wonder Circus to entertain the Newport 400, instead of a performance by French conductor Jardinet, and his symphony orchestra. The audience is delighted with the circus; when the blustery Jardinet arrives, Loophole, who delayed the Frenchman's arrival on the SS Normandie by implicating him in a dope ring, disposes of the conductor and his orchestra by having Tony and Punchy cut the moorings on a floating bandstand as they play the prelude to act III of Wagner's Lohengrin at the water's edge.

Meanwhile, Carter and his henchmen try to burn down the circus, but are thwarted by Tony and Punchy, along with the only witness to the robbery: Gibraltar the gorilla, who also retrieves Jeff's money from Carter after a big trapeze finale, which features Tony shooting Mrs. Dukesbury out of a cannon. Loophole asks Gibraltar if the money is all there and the ape carefully counts it. The film ends with Jardinet and his orchestra still playing Wagner to the waves.

== Cast ==
- Groucho Marx as Attorney J. Cheever Loophole
- Chico Marx as Antonio "Tony" Pirelli
- Harpo Marx as "Punchy"
- Kenny Baker as Jeff Wilson
- Florence Rice as Julie Randall
- Eve Arden as Peerless Pauline
- Margaret Dumont as Mrs. Susanna Dukesbury
- Nat Pendleton as Goliath the Strongman
- Fritz Feld as Jardinet
- James Burke as John Carter
- Jerry Maren as Little Professor Atom (credited as Jerry Marenghi)
- Barnett Parker as Whitcomb
- Edmund Mortimer as Judge Chanock (uncredited)
- Irving Bacon as Telegraph clerk (uncredited)
- Frank Orth as Diner cook (uncredited)
- Charles Gemora as Gibraltar the Gorilla (uncredited)
- Emory Parnell as Ringmaster (uncredited)
- Ralph "Tex" Madsen - Circus Performer on Train as “Tallest Texan Cowboy” (uncredited)

== Production notes ==
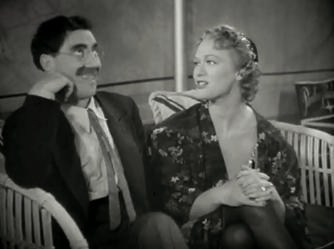
Groucho Marx and Eve Arden in a scene from At the Circus

Comedy legend Buster Keaton's career had long been on the downside, and he was reduced to working for scale at MGM as a gag man. Keaton's complex and elaborate sight gags did not mesh well with the Marx Brothers' brand of humor, and was sometimes a source of friction between the comedian and the brothers. When Groucho called Keaton on the incompatibility of his gags with the Marx Brothers, Keaton responded, "I'm only doing what Mr. Mayer asked me to do. You guys don't need help."

Hundreds of girls applied for the film, with eighteen finally chosen after "rigid tests". They had to be expert ballet dancers, have good singing voices, and they had to be able to prove all this by doing a toe-dance on a cantering bareback horse, while singing in key. Four of the girls were former circus riders. Several of the other girls had ridden in rodeos, either professionally or as amateurs, and the rest had been riding most of their lives.

The name of Groucho's character in this film, J. Cheever Loophole, recalls that of real-life financier J. Cheever Cowdin, who had ties to the film industry. In 1936, Cowdin led a group of investors who had lent $750,000 (equal to $17,401,079 today) to Carl Laemmle and his son Carl Laemmle, Jr., to finance the film Show Boat. Before the release of the film, the investors demanded repayment, but the Laemmles did not have the funds to pay it back. Because of this, Cowdin was able to take control of the Laemmle's Universal Pictures studio and served as the company's president until 1946. Show Boat proved to be a financial success and, had the loan not been called for repayment until after the film's release, the Laemmles would have been able to repay the loan and retain ownership of Universal.

Groucho was aged 48 during the filming of At the Circus, and his hairline had begun to recede. He wore a toupee in the film and would do the same for the following Marx Brothers film, Go West.

As a gag, At the Circus screenwriter Irving Brecher masqueraded as Groucho in publicity stills alongside Harpo and Chico. Brecher bore a marked resemblance to Groucho and is nearly unrecognizable in the photos, sporting Groucho's greasepaint mustache, eyebrows and glasses.

Groucho as J. Cheever Loophole was originally introduced in a key scene set in a courtroom which was filmed, but cut from the picture.

One of Groucho's oft-repeated stories about the filming At the Circus concerned the gorilla skin that an actor wore. On The Dick Cavett Show taped June 13, 1969, he said that the actor was too hot inside the skin under the bright lights, and during lunch he went to the studio commissary and poked several holes in the skin with an icepick. Upon discovering the holes, the manager of the gorilla skin became extremely angry and took the skin away. MGM scoured southern California for a replacement and finally located an orangutan skin in San Diego. An orangutan is much smaller than a gorilla, so a shorter actor was hired to fit inside it. Groucho said he received many inquiries about this, and some viewers he happened to meet would ask him why the gorilla was noticeably smaller in the second half of the picture.

== Musical numbers ==
- "Step Up And Take A Bow" (Arlen/Harburg)
- "Lydia, the Tattooed Lady" (Arlen/Harburg)
- "Two Blind Loves" (Arlen/Harburg)
- "Swingali" (Arlen/Harburg)
- "Blue Moon"
- "Beer Barrel Polka"

== Reception ==
Reviews from critics were generally not as positive as those for earlier Marx Brothers films. Frank S. Nugent of The New York Times wrote that "in all charity and with a very real twinge of regret, we must report that their new frolic is not exactly frolicsome; that it is, in cruel fact, a rather dispirited imitation of former Marx successes, a matter more of perspiration than inspiration and not at all up to the Marx standards (foot-high though they may be) of daffy comedy." Variety called the film "broad, ribald fun in familiar pattern to early pictures of the Marx Bros." Though Film Daily wrote, "The mad Marxmen have never been funnier, nor have they had a better story in which to cavort than 'At the Circus,'" Harrison's Reports called it "about the worst Marx picture seen in years ... Children should enjoy it, but hardly any adults." John Mosher of The New Yorker wrote that the Marxes seemed to be trying harder in this picture than they were in Room Service, "but the achievement of novelty or surprise, the true Marx note, is never apparent." In contrast, the November 11, 1939, issue of Ottawa Citizen described the film as "a veritable riot of hilarity" and "possibly the nuttiest of the films that Groucho, Chico and Harpo have perpetrated."
