= Animal Crackers (musical) =

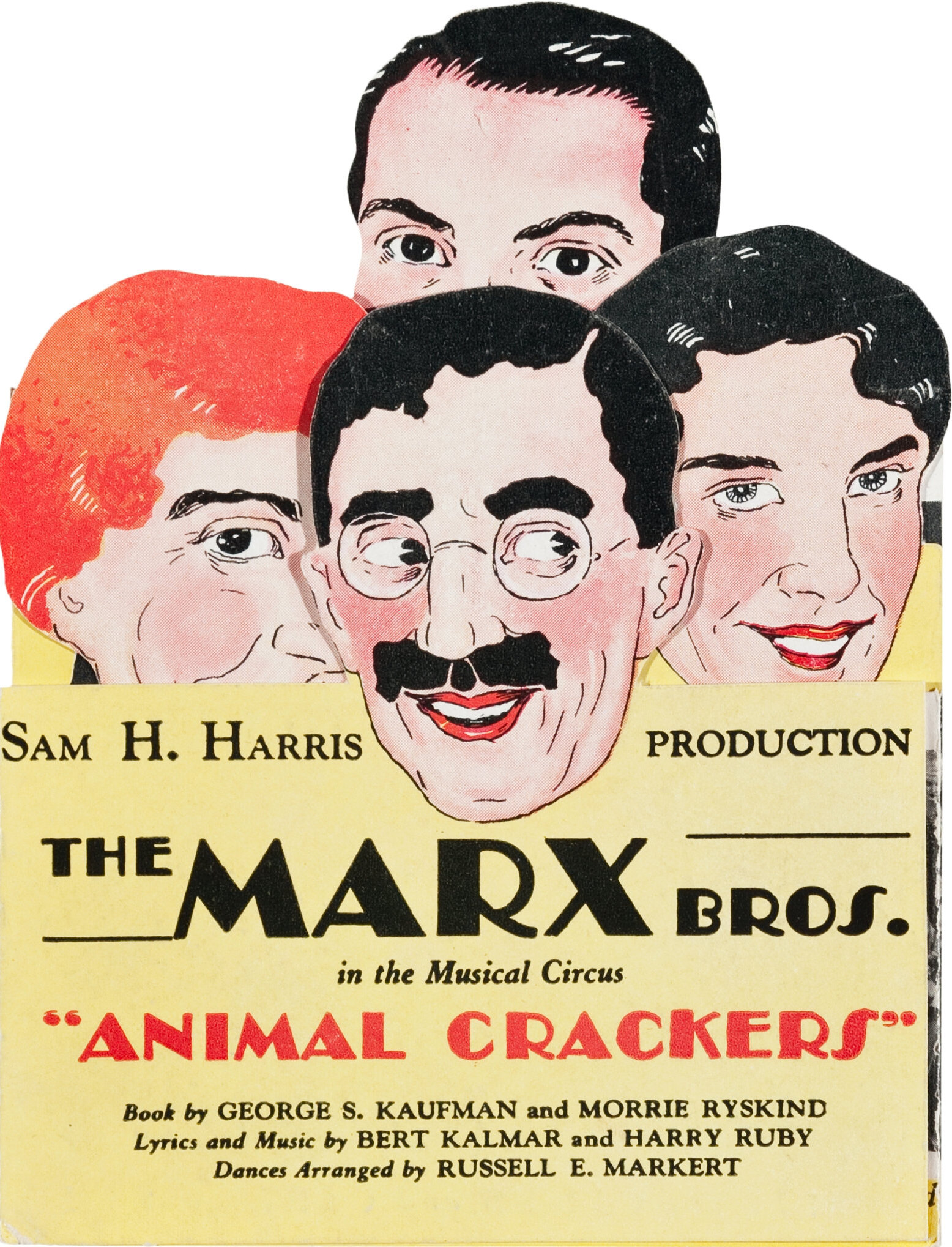
- Die cut handout for the original 1928 production
- Music: Bert Kalmar; Harry Ruby
- Lyrics: Bert Kalmar; Harry Ruby
- Book: George S. Kaufman; Morrie Ryskind
- Productions: 1928 Broadway; 1982 Washington, D.C. 1992 Connecticut; 1993 New Jersey; 1999 West End; 2009 Chicago

Animal Crackers is a musical play with music and lyrics by Bert Kalmar and Harry Ruby and a book by George S. Kaufman and Morrie Ryskind. The musical starred the Marx Brothers and is set at the Long Island Home of Mrs. Rittenhouse; a character portrayed by Margaret Dumont in the 1928 production on Broadway.

The lyrics and music of several songs in Animal Crackers entered the public domain in the United States in 2024. The full script, copyrighted in 1929, entered the public domain in the United States in 2025.

== Original production ==
Animal Crackers opened on Broadway on October 23, 1928, at the 44th Street Theatre, and closed April 6, 1929, running for 191 performances. The musical was produced by Sam H. Harris, staged by Oscar Eagle, and starred the four Marx Brothers and Margaret Dumont in the Brothers' second Broadway hit. Hermes Pan appeared as a chorus boy.

In 1930, Paramount Pictures released a film version of the play with the Marx Brothers and some of the principal actors repeating their roles from the stage production, but with most of the musical numbers cut.

After The Cocoanuts ran for almost three years at the Lyric Theatre, the "anarchic" Animal Crackers became the third and final Broadway show for the Marx Brothers (I'll Say She Is was the first), after which they transitioned to making films. Vaudeville's heyday was nearly over, as talking pictures were beginning to become popular. The Marx Brothers performed Animal Crackers on stage in the evenings, while during the day they were busy filming The Cocoanuts at Paramount's Astoria Studios in Astoria, Queens.

== Song list ==
The song list for the show is as follows:

Act I

- Opening

Hives and Dancers
The Maids — The Sixteen Markert Dancers
The Guests — Ensemble

- "News" — Wally Winston and the Sixteen Markert Dancers
- "Hooray for Captain Spaulding" — Hives, Jamison, Mrs. Rittenhouse, Captain Spaulding and Ensemble
- "Who's Been Listening to My Heart" — Mary and John
- "The Long Island Low-Down" — Wally Winston and Grace
- "Go Places and Do Things" — Ensemble
- Dance
- "Watching the Clouds Roll By" — Mary and John
- Piano speciality — Emanuel Ravelli

Act II

- "When Things Are Bright and Rosy" — Wally Winston and Arabella
- Reprise — Mary and John
- "Cool Off" — Grace and Ensemble
- The Royal Filipino Band
- Harp speciality — The Professor
- "Four of the Three Musketeers" — Spaulding, Jamison, Ravelli, Professor
- Finale — Company

- "Three Little Words" † ‡
- "Oh By Jingo!" (by Lew Brown and Albert von Tilzer)†
- "Show Me a Rose" ‡
- "The Social Ladder" †
- "I Wanna Be Loved by You" ††
- "Nevertheless (I'm in Love with You)" ††
- "The Blues My Naughty Sweetie Gives to Me" †††
- "Everyone Says I Love You" †††

† added for Goodspeed production
‡ added for Arena Stage and Paper Mill productions
†† added for Paper Mill production
††† added for the Goodman production

== Original 1928-9 Broadway cast ==
Character	Actor
Hives	Robert Greig*
Mrs. Rittenhouse	Margaret Dumont*
Arabella Rittenhouse	Alice Wood
Roscoe W. Chandler	Louis Sorin*
Wally Winston**	Bert Mathews
Mrs. Whitehead	Margaret Irving*
Grace Carpenter	Bobbie Perkins
M. Doucet**	Arthur Lipson
John Parker	Milton Watson
Mary Stewart**	Bernice Ackerman
Horatio Jamison	Zeppo Marx*
Jeffrey T. Spaulding	Groucho Marx*
Emanuel Ravelli	Chico Marx*
The Professor	Harpo Marx*

*Reprised the role in the film adaptation.

**Character not in the film adaptation.

== Later productions ==
The musical was revived in 1982 at the Arena Stage, Washington, D.C., directed by Douglas C. Wager and choreographed by Baayork Lee. It was also revived in 1992 by Goodspeed Musicals, Connecticut.

A production in 1993 at the Paper Mill Playhouse, New Jersey, was notable for being Kristin Chenoweth's first professional role.

It was produced in the U.K. by the Manchester Royal Exchange Theatre, where it was first mounted as part of the 1995–96 season, running from December 21 until February 3. It was then revived at that theatre's Swan Street Studio from March 12 to April 14, 1998. It was taken on tour, and played the Sculpture Court of The Barbican Centre in a circus tent in June 1998; after further touring, it transferred to the West End at the Lyric Theatre, opening on March 16, 1999, and closing on May 15, 1999 (the run brought to an early close, having been booking until September). Starring were Ben Keaton (Spaulding), Toby Sedgwick (the Professor), Joseph Alessi (Emanuel Ravelli), and Jean Challis (Mrs Rittenhouse).

Animal Crackers was produced to open the 2009–2010 season at the Goodman Theatre in Chicago, opening September 18, 2009, and closing on November 1. The revival starred Joey Slotnick (Spaulding), Molly Brennan (the Professor), Jonathan Brody (Emanuel Ravelli), and Ora Jones (Mrs. Rittenhouse). In addition, with a cast of only nine, several of the roles were doubled up by actors.

Animal Crackers also ran from May 6, 2011, to June 4, 2011, at The Lyric Stage Company of Boston.

"Animal Crackers" opened the 2013 season at the Williamstown Theatre Festival, running from June 26, 2013, to July 13, 2013.
