= The Cocoanuts =

1929 film starring the Four Marx Brothers

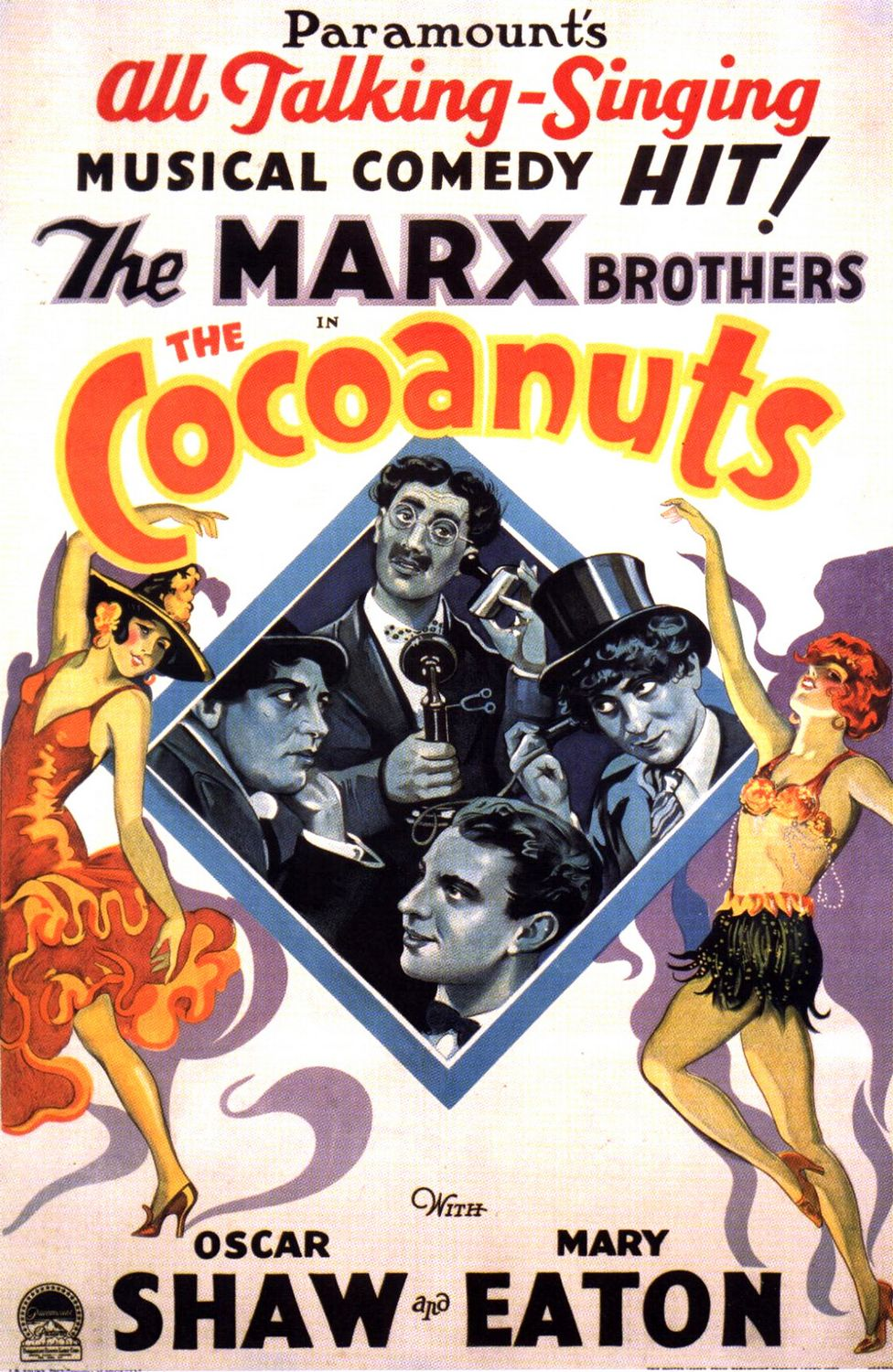
- Theatrical release poster
- Directed by: Robert Florey; Joseph Santley
- Screenplay by: Morrie Ryskind
- Based on: The Cocoanuts; 1925 play by George S. Kaufman
- Produced by: Monta Bell; Walter Wanger (uncr.)
- Starring: Groucho Marx; Harpo Marx; Chico Marx; Zeppo Marx
- Cinematography: George J. Folsey; J. Roy Hunt
- Edited by: Barney Rogan (uncr.)
- Music by: Irving Berlin; Victor Herbert (uncr.); Frank Tours (uncr.); Georges Bizet (uncr.)
- Distributed by: Paramount Pictures
- Release dates: May 23, 1929 (New York City); August 3, 1929 (United States)
- Running time: 93 minutes
- Country: United States
- Language: English
- Budget: $500,000 (estimated)
- Box office: $1.8 million (worldwide rentals)

The full film

The Cocoanuts is a 1929 pre-Code musical comedy film starring the Marx Brothers (Groucho, Harpo, Chico, and Zeppo). Produced for Paramount Pictures by Walter Wanger, who is not credited, the film also stars Mary Eaton, Oscar Shaw, Margaret Dumont and Kay Francis. The first sound film to credit more than one director (Robert Florey and Joseph Santley), it was adapted to the screen by Morrie Ryskind from the musical play by George S. Kaufman. Five of the film's tunes were composed by Irving Berlin, including "When My Dreams Come True", sung by Oscar Shaw and Mary Eaton.

On January 1, 2025, The Cocoanuts entered the public domain.

== Plot ==
The Cocoanuts is set in the Hotel de Cocoanut, a resort hotel, during the Florida land boom of the 1920s. The hotel is run by Mr. Hammer and his assistant, Jamison. Chico and Harpo arrive with empty suitcases, apparently planning to fill them by robbing and conning the guests. Mrs. Potter, a wealthy widow, is one of the hotel's few paying customers; her daughter Polly is in love with Bob Adams, a struggling young architect, who works to support himself as a clerk at the hotel. Adams has grand plans for the development of the entire area as Cocoanut Manor. Mrs. Potter wants Polly to marry Harvey Yates, whom she believes to be of higher social standing than Adams. Yates is actually a confidence man out to steal Mr. Potter's expensive diamond necklace with the help of his partner in crime, Penelope.

== Cast ==
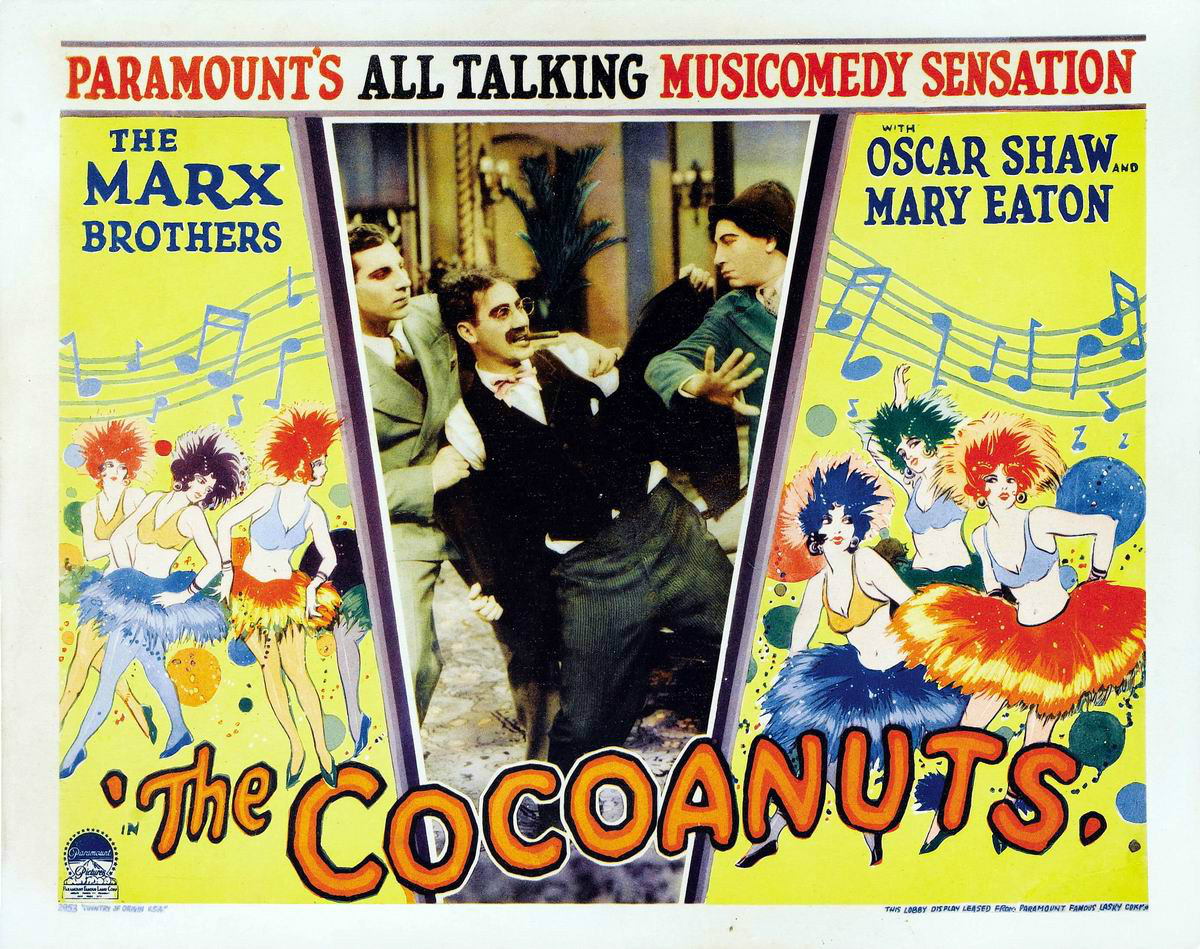
Lobby card

- Groucho Marx as Mr. Hammer
- Harpo Marx as Harpo
- Chico Marx as Chico
- Zeppo Marx as Jamison
- Mary Eaton as Polly Potter
- Oscar Shaw as Bob Adams
- Margaret Dumont as Mrs. Potter
- Kay Francis as Penelope
- Cyril Ring as Harvey Yates
- Basil Ruysdael as Detective Hennessy
- Barton MacLane as Muscle Man at beach (uncredited)

Dancers:

- Gamby-Hale Girls
- Allan K. Foster Girls

== Production ==
Principal photography began on Monday, February 4, 1929, at Paramount's Astoria studio. The Marx Brothers shot their contributions during the day. At night, they traveled to the 44th Street Theatre, where they were concurrently performing the 1928 Broadway musical Animal Crackers.

Referring to directors Robert Florey and Joseph Santley, Groucho Marx remarked, "One of them didn't understand English and the other didn't understand Harpo."

As was common in the early days of sound film, to eliminate the sound of the camera motors, the cameras and the cameramen were enclosed in large soundproof booths with glass fronts to allow filming. This resulted in largely static camera work. For many years, a false legend had it that Florey, who had never seen the Marxes' work before, was put in the soundproof booth because he could not contain his laughter at the brothers' spontaneous antics.

Every piece of paper seen in the movie is soaking wet, in order to keep crackling paper sounds from overloading the primitive recording equipment of the time. After the 27th take of the "Viaduct" scene, Florey finally got the idea to soak the paper in water; the 28th take of the "Viaduct" scene used soaked paper, and this take was finally quiet and used in the film.

The "ink" that Harpo drank from the hotel lobby inkwell was actually Coca-Cola, and the telephone mouthpiece that he nibbled, was made of chocolate, both inventions of Robert Florey.

Paramount brought conductor Frank Tours (1877–1963) over from London to be the film's musical director, as he had also been the conductor for the show's original Broadway production in 1925. At the time, Tours had been conducting at the Plaza Theatre in Piccadilly Circus (Paramount's premier exhibition venue in the UK). Filming took place at the Paramount studios in Astoria, Queens; their second film, Animal Crackers, was also shot there. After that, production of all Marx Brothers films moved to Hollywood.

== Songs ==
- "Florida by the Sea" (instrumental with brief vocal by chorus during opening montage)
- "When My Dreams Come True" (theme song, Mary Eaton and Oscar Shaw variously, several reprises)
- "The Bell-Hops" (instrumental, dance number)
- "Monkey Doodle Doo" (vocal by Mary Eaton and dance number)
- "Ballet Music" (instrumental, dance number)
- "Tale of the Shirt" (vocal by Basil Ruysdael, words set to music from Carmen by Georges Bizet)
- "Tango Melody" (vocal included in the stage production, used in the film as background music only)
- "Gypsy Love Song" (by Victor Herbert, piano solo by Chico Marx)

Several songs from the stage play were omitted from the film: "Lucky Boy", sung by the chorus to congratulate Bob on his engagement to Polly and "A Little Bungalow", a love duet sung by Bob and Polly that was replaced with "When My Dreams Come True" in the film.

Irving Berlin wrote two songs entitled "Monkey Doodle Doo". The first was published in 1913, the second introduced in the 1925 stage production and featured in the film. They are very different songs.

Although legend claims Berlin wrote the song "Always" for The Cocoanuts, he never meant for the song to be included, writing it, instead, as a gift for his fiancée.

== Reception ==
When the Marx Brothers were shown the final cut of the film, they were so horrified they tried to buy the negative back and prevent its release. Paramount wisely resisted – the movie turned out to be a big box office hit, with a $1,800,000 gross making it one of the most successful early talking films.

The film premiered on May 23, 1929, at the Rialto Theatre in New York. It received mostly positive reviews from critics, with the Marx Brothers themselves earning most of the praise while other aspects of the film drew a more mixed reaction. Mordaunt Hall of The New York Times reported that the film "aroused considerable merriment" among the viewing audience, and that a sequence using an overhead shot was "so engaging that it elicited plaudits from many in the jammed theatre." However, he found the audio quality during some of the singing to be "none too good", adding, "a deep-voiced bass's tones almost fade into a whisper in a close-up. Mary Eaton is charming, but one obtains little impression of her real ability as a singer."

Variety called it "a comedy hit for the regular picture houses. That's all it has – comedy – but that's enough." It reported the sound had "a bit of muffling now and then" and that the dancers weren't always filmed well: "When the full 48 were at work only 40 could be seen and those behind the first line could be seen but dimly."

"It is as a funny picture and not as a musical comedy, not for its songs, pretty girls, or spectacular scenes, that The Cocoanuts succeeds", wrote John Mosher in The New Yorker. "Neither Mary Eaton, nor Oscar Shaw, who contribute the "love interest", is effective, nor are the chorus scenes in the least superior to others of the same sort in various musical-comedy-movies now running in town. To the Marxes belongs the success of the show, and their peculiar talents seem, surprisingly enough, even more manifest on the screen than on the stage."

Film Daily called it "a good amount of fun, although some of it proves tiresome. This is another case of a musical comedy transferred almost bodily to the screen and motion picture treatment forgotten. The result is a good many inconsistencies which perhaps may be overlooked provided the audience accepts the offering for what it is."

== Accolades ==
- American Film Institute – recognition
- AFI's 100 Years... 100 Laughs – nominated

== See also ==
- Animal Crackers (1930), the next Marx Brothers film
- List of American films of 1929
- List of early sound feature films (1926–1929)
- List of United States comedy films
