= A Night at the Opera (film) =

1935 Marx Brothers film directed by Sam Wood

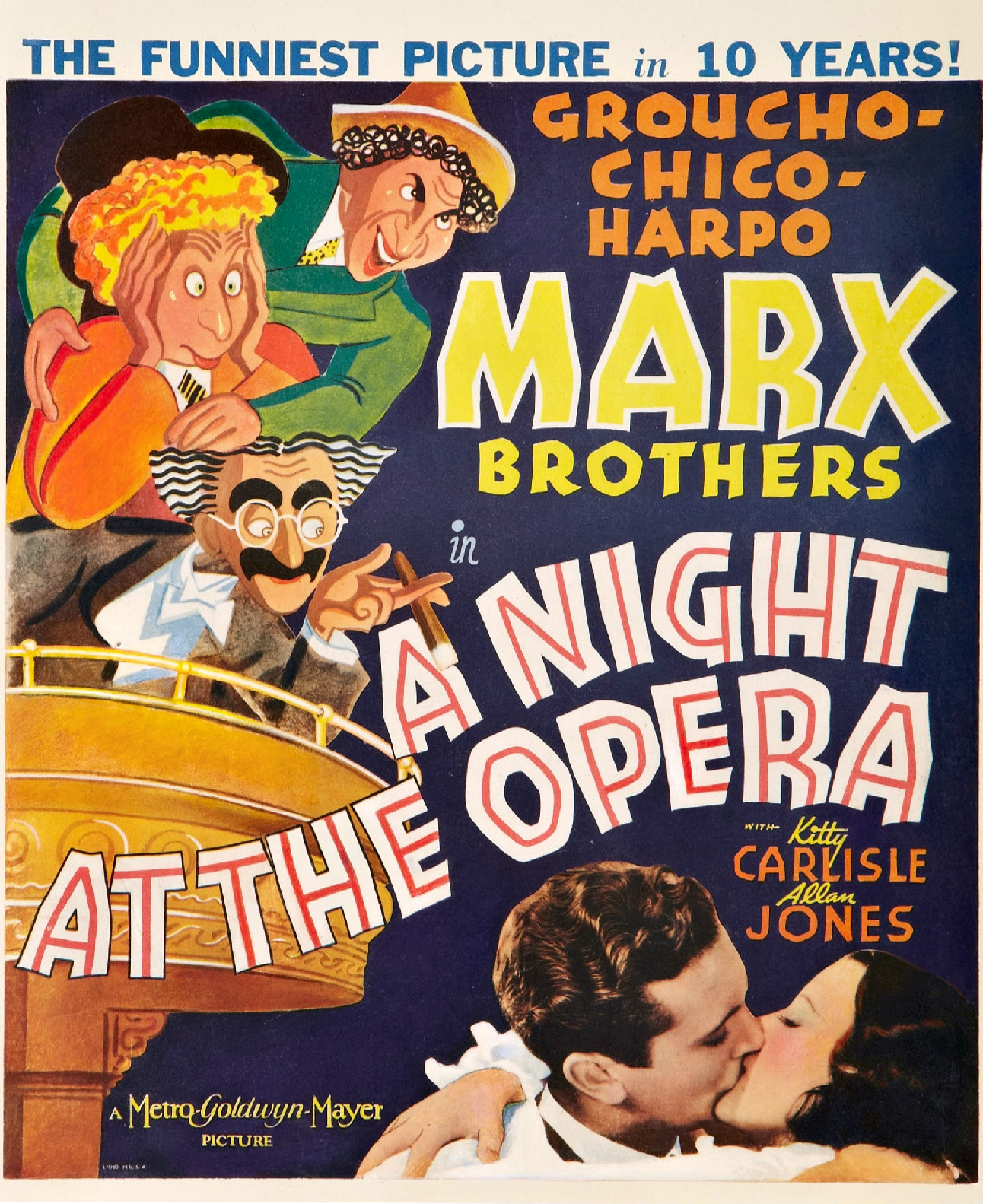
- Theatrical release poster
- Directed by: Sam Wood
- Screenplay by: George S. Kaufman; Morrie Ryskind; Add'l dialogue: Al Boasberg
- Story by: James Kevin McGuinness
- Produced by: Irving Thalberg
- Starring: Groucho Marx; Chico Marx; Harpo Marx
- Cinematography: Merritt B. Gerstad
- Edited by: William LeVanway
- Music by: Herbert Stothart
- Production company: Metro-Goldwyn-Mayer
- Distributed by: Loew's, Inc.
- Release date: November 15, 1935
- Running time: 91 minutes
- Country: United States
- Language: English
- Budget: $1,057,000
- Box office: $1,815,000

A Night at the Opera is a 1935 American comedy film starring the Marx Brothers (Groucho, Harpo and Chico), and featuring Kitty Carlisle, Allan Jones, Margaret Dumont, Sig Ruman, and Walter Woolf King.

It was the first of five films the Marx Brothers made under contract for Metro-Goldwyn-Mayer after their departure from Paramount Pictures, and the first after Zeppo left the act. The film was written by George S. Kaufman and Morrie Ryskind from a story by James Kevin McGuinness, with additional uncredited dialogue by Al Boasberg. The film was directed by Sam Wood.

One of MGM's biggest hits at the 1935 box office, A Night at the Opera was selected in 1993 for preservation in the National Film Registry by the Library of Congress as being "culturally, historically, or aesthetically significant". It is also included in the 2007 update of AFI's 100 Years...100 Movies, at number 85; and previously in AFI's 100 Years...100 Laughs 2000 showing, at number 12.

== Plot ==
The film's trailer

At a restaurant in Milan, Italy, wealthy widow Mrs. Claypool has apparently been stood up for dinner by Otis B. Driftwood, her business manager. After she discovers him seated directly behind her and dining with another woman, Driftwood joins Mrs. Claypool and soon introduces her to Herman Gottlieb, director of the New York Opera Company, also dining at the restaurant. Driftwood has arranged for Mrs. Claypool to invest $200,000 in the opera company, allowing Gottlieb enough money to engage the famous Italian tenor Rodolfo Lassparri, "the greatest tenor since Caruso".

Backstage at the opera house, chorister Ricardo Baroni hires his best friend Fiorello to be his manager. Ricardo is in love with the soprano, Rosa Castaldi, who is also being courted by Lassparri. Driftwood arrives backstage and finds Lassparri attacking Tomasso, his dresser; Tomasso knocks Lassparri unconscious by hitting him over the head with a mallet. Fiorello appears and introduces himself to Driftwood as the manager of the "greatest tenor in the world". Driftwood believes Fiorello is referring to Lassparri (who is still lying unconscious at their feet) and unwittingly signs Ricardo to a contract.

Soon, Driftwood, Mrs. Claypool, Rosa, Lassparri and Gottlieb all set sail from Italy to New York aboard an ocean liner. After bidding farewell to Rosa at the pier, Ricardo, Fiorello, and Tomasso stow away inside Driftwood's steamer trunk. Discovering the three in his trunk, he asks them to leave before Mrs. Claypool arrives for a rendezvous. Fiorello refuses to leave until the trio have eaten and eventually Driftwood's very small stateroom is crowded with an assortment of people (see Stateroom scene below).

Later, Lassparri spots the three stowaways among the Italian immigrants on the ship, and they are caught and thrown into the brig. They escape with Driftwood's help and are able to sneak into the country by posing as three famous bearded aviators, (Note: The nationality of the aviators is never identified. In The Annotated Marx Brothers: A Filmgoer's Guide to In-Jokes, Obscure References and Sly Details (2015, McFarland, ISBN 978-0786497058), Matthew Coniam points out that the omission seems to have been intentional, in order to avoid an obvious lampoon of the Italian fascist aviator Italo Balbo, and that in the newspaper caption that follows they are identified as the "Santopoulos Brothers", suggesting that they may be Greek. (pp. 124–125)) who are traveling aboard the ship. During a hero's welcome in New York, the stowaways are exposed as frauds and they flee, hiding out in Driftwood's hotel room while pursued by police sergeant Henderson.

Meanwhile, Rosa and Ricardo are reunited when he climbs through the window of her hotel room. Lassparri appears, and after a physical altercation with Ricardo, both Rosa and Driftwood are fired from the opera company by Gottlieb. Driftwood, Fiorello, and Tomasso decide to seek revenge by sabotaging the opera company's opening night performance of Il trovatore with various antics, climaxing with the abduction of Lassparri from the stage, forcing Gottlieb to substitute Ricardo in his place. Ricardo accepts on the condition Rosa substitutes for the female lead as well. Mrs. Claypool and the audience clearly prefer Ricardo over Lassparri, and the latter is booed and hit with an apple after he is untied and attempts to return to the stage. The film ends with Driftwood and Fiorello negotiating another contract as Rosa and Ricardo sing an encore.

== Cast ==
- Groucho Marx as Otis B. Driftwood
- Chico Marx as Fiorello
- Harpo Marx as Tomasso
- Kitty Carlisle as Rosa Castaldi
- Allan Jones as Ricardo Baroni
- Walter Woolf King as Rodolfo Lassparri
- Sig Ruman as Herman Gottlieb (as Siegfried Rumann)
- Margaret Dumont as Mrs. Claypool
- Edward Keane as the Captain
- Robert Emmet O'Connor as Sergeant Henderson
- Purnell Pratt as the Mayor (uncredited)
- Harry Allen as doorman (uncredited)
- Billy Gilbert as musician who asks Chico not to play the piano (uncredited)
- Helen Grayco as young girl who watches Chico play the piano (uncredited)

== Selected sequences ==
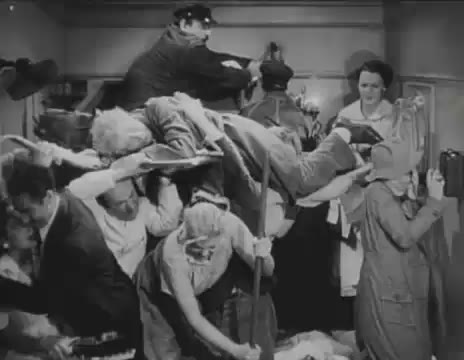
The stateroom scene, from the trailer to the film

=== Stateroom ===
This scene was written primarily by legendary gag man Al Boasberg. Famously eccentric, Boasberg typed up the finished scene, then shredded the pages into thin pieces and tacked them to his ceiling. It took Irving Thalberg and the brothers hours to cut and paste the scene back together.

Driftwood plans a rendezvous with Mrs. Claypool in his stateroom. Then he finds out how small it is (a third class cabin, about the size of a janitor's closet), and that he, his steamer trunk, and the bed barely fit in it. Driftwood discovers that Fiorello, Tomasso, and Ricardo have stowed away in his steamer trunk and discarded his clothes. Fiorello insists on eating ("We getta food or we don't go"). Driftwood calls a steward ("I say, Stew") and orders dinner.

Driftwood: "And two medium-boiled eggs."
Fiorello (inside room): "And two hard-boiled eggs."
Driftwood: "And two hard-boiled eggs."
Tomasso: "(honk)"
Driftwood (inside room): "Make that three hard boiled eggs."

This continues until Fiorello and Tomasso each have ordered about a dozen hard-boiled eggs and Driftwood has ordered about everything else – including coffee to sober up some stewed prunes. This sets up the "stateroom scene", in which a total of 15 people crowd into Driftwood's tiny cabin.

The three stowaways have to hide out in the room while a parade of people walk in, asking to either use the cabin, or to perform their regular duties. Crammed into this little space at the end of the scene are Driftwood, Fiorello, Tomasso, Ricardo, two cleaning ladies who make up the bed, a manicurist (Manicurist: "Do you want your nails long or short?" Driftwood: "You better make them short, it's getting kind of crowded in here!"), a ship's engineer and his portly assistant, a young woman passenger using the phone to call her Aunt Minnie, a maid (Maid: "I come to mop up." Driftwood: "You'll have to start on the ceiling.") and four waiters with trays of hard-boiled eggs. (Driftwood: "Tell Aunt Minnie to send up a bigger room.") All of the foregoing tumble out into the hallway when Mrs. Claypool opens the door.

=== Contract ===
The contract scene between Driftwood and Fiorello ("the party of the first part ..."):

Fiorello: "Hey, wait, wait. What does this say here, this thing here?"
Driftwood: "Oh, that? Oh, that's the usual clause that's in every contract. That just says, it says, 'if any of the parties participating in this contract are shown not to be in their right mind, the entire agreement is automatically nullified'."
Fiorello: "Well, I don't know..."
Driftwood: "It's all right, that's in every contract. That's, that's what they call a sanity clause."
Fiorello: "Ha-ha-ha-ha-ha! You can't fool me. There ain't no Sanity Clause!"

=== Opera ===
True to its title, the film includes adaptations of some real opera scenes from Pagliacci and Il trovatore, featuring the Miserere duet sung by Kitty Carlisle and Allan Jones. The opera setting also allowed MGM to add big production song numbers (which were one of this studio's specialties), such as the song "Alone", with the departure of the steamship, and the song "Cosi Cosa" with the Italian buffet and dancing.

Carlisle and Jones were both trained in operatic singing and provided their own singing voices in the film. Walter Woolf King was a trained baritone, but he portrayed a tenor in the film. His singing was dubbed by Hawaiian Metropolitan Opera tenor Tandy MacKenzie.

=== Hidden material ===
In the scene where the three stowaways are impersonating "the three greatest aviators in the world", Driftwood seems to talk gibberish with the dignitaries. Actually it is English; if played backwards, it can be heard what they are saying ("This man is accusing you of being impostors", etc.). It was recorded normally, then reversed and dubbed over the scene in post-production.

== Musical numbers ==
- "Alone" (Nacio Herb Brown and Arthur Freed)
- "Santa Lucia"
- "Garibaldi Hymn"
- "All I Do Is Dream of You"
- "Cosi-Cosa" (Bronisław Kaper and Walter Jurmann)
- "Take Me Out to the Ball Game"
- "Stridono lassù" (from Pagliacci)
- Prelude to Il trovatore
- "Anvil Chorus" (from Il trovatore)
- "Stride la vampa" (from Il trovatore)
- "Di quella pira" (from Il trovatore)
- "Miserere", (From Il trovatore)

== Production ==
In an interview with Richard J. Anobile in The Marx Brothers Scrapbook, Groucho said he was so appalled by an early draft of the script—which was apparently written by Bert Kalmar and Harry Ruby—that he shouted, "Why fuck around with second-rate talent, get Kaufman and Ryskind [to write the screenplay]!"

At the suggestion of producer Irving Thalberg, the film marked a change of direction in the brothers' career. In their Paramount films, the brothers' characters were much more anarchic: they attacked almost anybody who was so unfortunate as to cross their paths whether they deserved it or not, albeit comically. Thalberg, however, felt that this made the brothers unsympathetic, particularly to female filmgoers. So in the MGM films, the brothers were recast as more helpful characters, saving most of their comic attacks for the villains.

Though some Marx Brothers fans disliked these changes, Thalberg was vindicated when the film became a solid hit. It helped that the film contained some of what fans consider to be among the brothers' funniest and most memorable routines. These routines were carefully honed in a series of live stage performances, as the brothers took to the road and performed the new material around the country before filming began.

However, according to Oscar Levant, the first preview of the finished film in Long Beach was a "disaster", with "hardly a laugh" as was the second. Thalberg and George S. Kaufman spent days in the editing room, adjusting the timing to match the rhythm of a stage performance. About nine minutes was cut from the running time, and the result was a hit.

=== Subsequent re-editing ===
The film originally was to have begun with each of the Marx Brothers taking turns roaring instead of Leo the Lion (MGM's iconic mascot); Harpo was to have honked his horn. This unique opening was created, but not used in the released film because MGM studio head Louis B. Mayer felt the parody would cheapen the respected trademark. It turned up years later, however, in a re-release trailer for the film.

According to MGM's dialogue cutting continuity and Leonard Maltin's audio commentary on the DVD release, the film originally began (after the opening credits) with the image of a "boat on canal". A superimposed title read, "Italy – Where They Sing All Day and Go to the Opera at Night", and was followed by a musical number featuring bits and pieces from Leoncavallo's Pagliacci performed by "everyday" Italians: a street sweeper sings part of the prologue ("Un nido di memorie...") as he greets a man who then hands out opera tickets to a group of children emerging from a store; the children respond with "la-la-la-la-la, verso un paese strano" (from "Stridono lassù"); a "captain" comes down a set of steps, salutes a sentry, then bursts into "Vesti la giubba"; then, a lap dissolve into a hotel lobby, where a "baggage man" is rolling a trunk and crooning about "nettare divino" ("divine nectar"); a waiter joins the baggage man in song, enters the dining room, and sings as he serves a man who for a few notes also sings; the waiter then crosses the dining room to speak to Mrs. Claypool (Margaret Dumont), marking the beginning of the film in existing copies.

In his commentary, Maltin repeats an assertion originally made by Glenn Mitchell in The Marx Brothers Encyclopedia that the scene was cut during World War II to remove references to Italy. However, according to MPAA records, the film was re-edited by MGM in 1938, prior to the war, because of complaints from the Italian government that it "made fun of Italian people". Unfortunately, the edits were made to MGM's master negative, and no prints of the original uncut version are known to survive. This notable cut, with several other small ones made at about the same time, is why the stated running time of the film (95 minutes) was three minutes longer than that of existing prints.

A persistent rumor concerning A Night at the Opera involves the presence of the Marx Brothers' father Sam Marx (also known as "Frenchy") on the ship and on the dock, waving goodbye. Both Groucho and Harpo stated this as fact in their memoirs, and film critic Leonard Maltin repeats it in the DVD commentary. But this could not have occurred, because Sam Marx had died in 1933, during pre-production of Duck Soup, two years before A Night at the Opera was released. The rumor arose because Frenchy had had such a cameo appearance in the Marx Brothers' earlier film Monkey Business. There is, however, a reference to the Marx Brothers' mother, Minnie Marx, during the stateroom scene, in which a woman asks, "Is my Aunt Minnie in here?"

Part of the concept of casting the Marx Brothers as stowaways on a ship was recycled from Monkey Business. As Groucho's and Margaret Dumont's characters are boarding the ocean liner, Dumont asks Groucho, "Are you sure you have everything, Otis?"; Groucho replies, "I've never had any complaints yet." In two different interviews with Dick Cavett on The Dick Cavett Show – Comic Legends DVD, Groucho claimed that that exchange of dialogue was banned in a majority of states when the film was released because it was too suggestive, although the number of states varied with different versions of the story.

=== Hungarian rediscovery ===
In 2008, a film student reported that the Hungarian National Film Archive possesses a longer print of the film. While the print does not contain the opening musical number, it does contain several excised lines referencing Italy that had been cut sometime after the film's original release. With the opening number still missing, it may be that this scene was cut before the subsequent edits were made. However, the discovery of the Hungarian print has not yet been independently verified, and Turner Entertainment, who owns the rights to the film, has not indicated that any restoration is forthcoming.

== Style change ==
A Night at the Opera began a new era for the Marx Brothers' style of comedy. Whereas their previous comedies at Paramount Pictures consisted of a constant barrage of jokes within a loosely plotted storyline, A Night at the Opera was calculated comedy. Producer Irving Thalberg insisted on a strong story structure, making the Brothers more sympathetic characters, interweaving their comedy with romantic plots and non-comic spectacular musical numbers. The targets of their mischief were largely confined to clear villains. Thalberg's logic was that the Marxes could get "twice the box office with half the laughs", believing their films would attract a wider audience. Groucho himself agreed with Thalberg's rationale. In his autobiography, Groucho and Me, he wrote of the Marx Brothers' 13 films, "Two were far above average. Some of the others were pretty good. Some were deplorable. The best two were made by Thalberg"—a reference not only to A Night at the Opera but also A Day at the Races.

Another idea to which Thalberg consented, was that before filming would commence on an upcoming film, the Marx Brothers would try out the new material on the vaudeville stage, working on comic timing and learning which jokes and gags earned a laugh and which did not. Jokes were planted accordingly, so the laughs could be timed correctly. What was to become the famous "stateroom" scene was nearly eliminated because it was not getting any laughs. One evening the Marx Brothers threw away the script and ad-libbed the whole scene. As a result, a weak scene was transformed into one of their all-time classics.

In A Night at the Opera, each of the brothers' characters was refined: Groucho was somewhat less nonsensical, and less trouble; Chico became less of a scammer and gained some intelligence; Harpo became less mischievous and more sympathetic. The film dives straight into a plot and accompanying comedy, with every scene having a clear beginning, middle, and end. The end consisted of a grand finale in the traditional MGM musical fashion, something lacking from the brothers' Paramount efforts.

A Night at the Opera established a basic formula that was utilized in every subsequent film the Marx Brothers made at MGM:

- a friendship existing between the romantic couple and Chico
- establishing sympathy for Harpo
- Chico and Groucho going through an extensive verbal routine
- Harpo joining as Chico's partner (or brother)
- lush surroundings as a backdrop to the brothers' lunacy
- a key scene with all three Marxes
- a fall from grace
- a rebound on a grand scale in which everything is righted

== Release ==
=== Box office ===
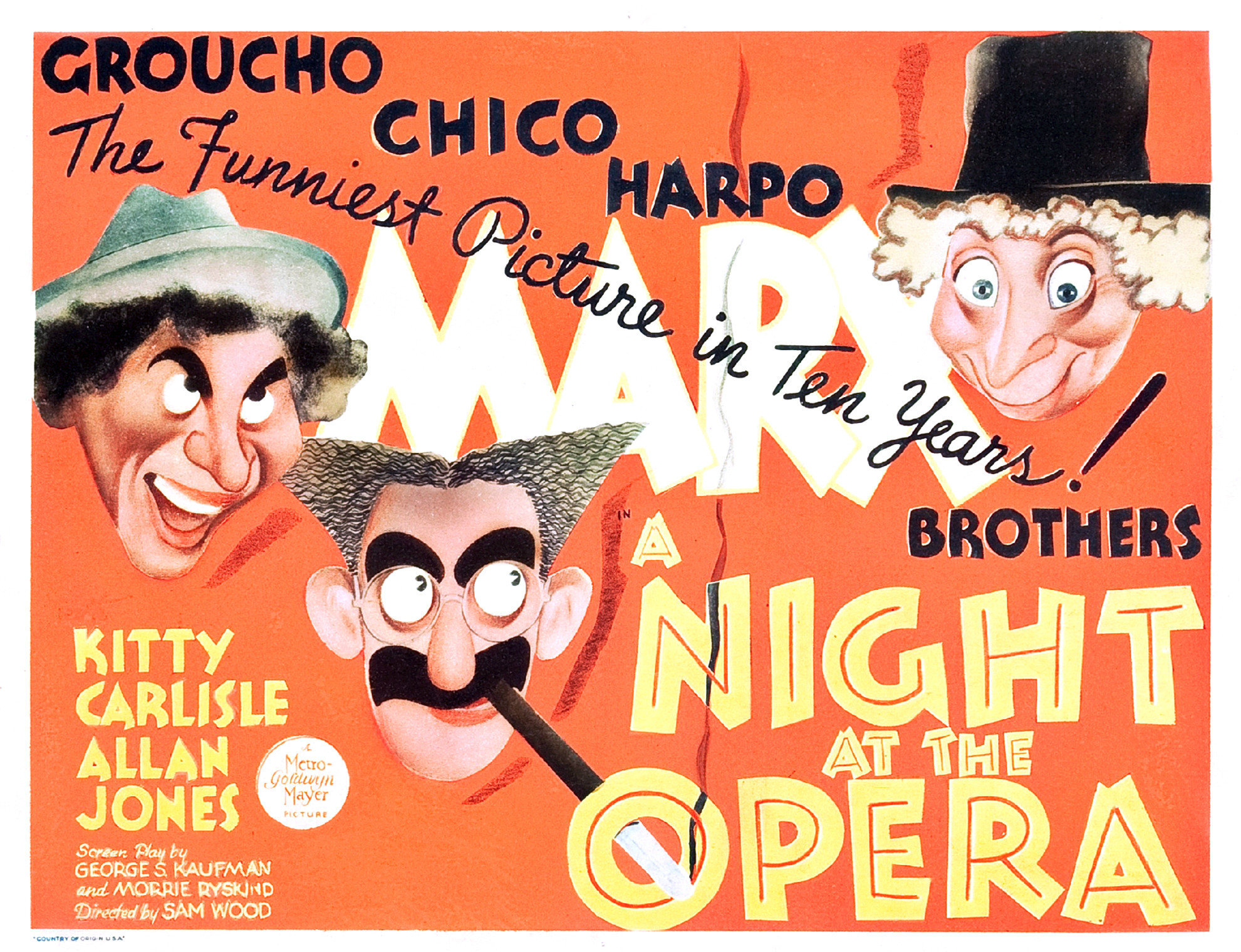
Lobby card

The film grossed a total (domestic and foreign) of $1,815,000: $1,164,000 from the US and Canada and $651,000 elsewhere. It made a profit of $90,000.

=== Critical reception ===
==== Contemporary reviews ====
A Night at the Opera was banned in Budapest.

Contemporary reviews were positive. Andre Sennwald of The New York Times wrote, "If A Night at the Opera is a trifle below their best, it is also considerably above the standard of laughter that has been our portion since they quit the screen. George S. Kaufman and Morrie Ryskind have given them a resounding slapstick to play with and they wield it with maniacal delight." "The comedy material is always good and sometimes brilliant", reported Variety. "This should be a laugh fest with all types of audiences", wrote The Film Daily. "This is a good Marx Brothers film, good as any they have done", wrote John Mosher in The New Yorker. "It may not be new or surprising, but it's quick and funny."Motion Picture Herald stated that it would appeal to a broad audience, and wrote, "From raucous, wild, woozy comedy in action, dialogue and situations to the charm of beautiful music, there is something of unique interest in this picture."

==== Retrospective reviews ====
The film holds a 97% "fresh" score at Rotten Tomatoes based on 69 reviews, with an average rating of 8.7/10. The site's critical consensus reads, "Watermelons may go out of season, but in A Night at the Opera, the Marx Brothers' daffy laughs are never anything less than uproariously fresh." Ken Hanke calls it "hysterical, but not up to the boys' Paramount films." Mark Bourne concurs: "[The Marx Brothers] still let the air out of stuffed shirts and barbecue a few sacred cows, but something got lost in all that MGMness when the screen's ultimate anti-authoritarian team starting working the Andy Hardy side of the street."

Roger Ebert admitted that, while A Night at the Opera "contains some of their best work", he "fast-forward[ed] over the sappy interludes involving Kitty Carlisle and Allan Jones." Danel Griffin says: "A Night at the Opera is funny, but this is NOT the Marx Brothers, and their earlier style is so sorely missed that the film falls flat. The main problem with A Night at the Opera is the obvious lack of the Marx Brothers' trademark anarchy. What distinguished them in their Paramount films from all other comedians was their thumb-biting indictment of society."

The film is recognized by American Film Institute in these lists:

- 1998: AFI's 100 Years...100 Movies – Nominated
- 2000: AFI's 100 Years...100 Laughs – #12
- 2005: AFI's 100 Years...100 Movie Quotes: "sanity clause" dialog, nominated
- 2006: AFI's Greatest Movie Musicals – Nominated
- 2007: AFI's 100 Years...100 Movies (10th Anniversary Edition) – #85

It also placed 78th in Variety's top 100 comedies of all time.

== In popular culture ==
Stateroom scene

- The Belgian singer Jacques Brel was inspired by the famous stateroom gag in the film when he wrote his song "Le Gaz" on Jacques Brel 67 which depicts several men all crowding together in one room to meet a courtesan "for the gas".
- The 1st season, 23rd episode of The Bob Newhart Show titled "Bum Voyage" features an homage to the stateroom scene where Bob and a dozen cast members are crammed into Bob and Emily's stateroom with Howard Borden announcing that "The first one that makes a Marx Brothers joke gets it!"
- Cyndi Lauper featured a similar overcrowded stateroom gag in her music video for the song "Girls Just Want to Have Fun".
- Sting also recreated the overcrowded stateroom gag in his music video for the 1991 song "All This Time".
- The Warner Bros. animated show Animaniacs also paid homage to the stateroom gag in the short "Hercule Yakko".
- In the Disney Channel series The Suite Life of Zack & Cody, a scene almost identical to the stateroom scene occurs in the Martins' closet.
- An 8th-season episode of Seinfeld titled "The Pothole" features a homage to the stateroom scene in which the four main characters all cram into a small janitor's closet that Elaine Benes is using to get Chinese food delivered; they all end up spilling out after Cosmo Kramer spills ammonia.
- Mystery writer Jeffrey Cohen paid tribute to the stateroom scene in his novel A Night at the Operation (2009). The book's title also parodies the name of the movie.

Sanity clause

- The British punk band The Damned used Chico's quote ("There ain't no sanity clause") as a title for a 1980 single.
- Detective Comics #826 pays homage to the film. In it the Joker captures Tim Drake, the third Robin, and takes him on a mad spree in a car, running over anyone they encounter over the Christmas season. When the Joker plans to kill a street Santa Claus, Robin distracts him by saying "You can't fool me. There ain't no Sanity Claus." The Joker laughs and they get in an argument over which Marx Brothers film is the source of the gag. Robin claims it is from The Big Store. The Joker is distracted long enough for Robin to attack him and escape. The Joker himself uses the line in The Killing Joke.

General

- The British rock group Queen paid homage to this film by naming their 1975 studio album after it. Their follow-up album, A Day at the Races, was also named after a Marx Brothers film.
- The film's script is credited as the basis for the 1992 film Brain Donors, executive produced by David Zucker and Jerry Zucker of Airplane! and The Naked Gun fame.
- In the 1990 film The Freshman, "Rodolfo Lassparri" is the alias used on Matthew Broderick's passport.
- In the 1993 film Six Degrees of Separation (also released by Metro-Goldwyn-Mayer), Kitty Carlisle appears in the small role of Mrs. Bannister; during production of the film, the idea of naming her character either Rosa Castaldi or Rosa Baroni was discussed as a tribute to her role in A Night at the Opera nearly 60 years earlier, but the idea never came to fruition.
- The German power metal band Blind Guardian paid homage to this film by naming one of their albums after it.
- The demented main character played by veteran horror actor Bill Moseley in Rob Zombie's films House of 1000 Corpses, The Devil's Rejects, and 3 from Hell is named Otis B. Driftwood. He is the older brother of Baby Firefly, and stepson to Cutter "Captain Spaulding" Firefly. He takes over leadership of the family of killers following Captain Spaulding's prison execution in 3 From Hell.

== See also ==
- List of American comedy films
