= Erin Fleming =

Canadian actress (1941–2003)

Erin Leslie Fleming
- Born: Marilyn Suzanne Fleming; August 13, 1941; New Liskeard, Ontario, Canada
- Died: April 15, 2003 (aged 61); Los Angeles, California, US
- Occupation: Actress

Erin Leslie Fleming (August 13, 1941 – April 15, 2003) was a Canadian actress, best known as the companion and manager of comedian Groucho Marx during his final years.

== Early career ==
Fleming was born Marilyn Suzanne Fleming on August 13, 1941, in New Liskeard, Ontario, Canada. She appeared in minor roles on television and in six feature films between 1965 and 1976. Her most prominent film role was in the 1972 Woody Allen movie Everything You Always Wanted to Know About Sex* (*But Were Afraid to Ask).

== Relationship with Groucho Marx ==
Fleming's influence on and relationship with Groucho Marx were controversial. Marx had been introduced to Fleming by television producer and writer Jerry Davis in 1971 and she was initially (and extemporaneously) hired as his secretary. She eventually assumed the role of his manager. Many of Marx's friends and colleagues acknowledged that she did much to revive his popularity, by arranging a series of personal appearances and one-man shows culminating in a sold-out performance at Carnegie Hall, which was recorded and issued on a best-selling record album. She also successfully lobbied for the honorary Academy Award Marx received in 1974. Several of Marx's friends, family and employees, including his son Arthur and youngest daughter Melinda, charged Fleming with embezzling money and pushing the increasingly frail Marx to the limits of his endurance, largely for her own personal gain. There were also charges of psychological and suspected physical abuse. Marx's friend, writer Sidney Sheldon, wrote a roman à clef on Fleming's relationship with Marx titled A Stranger in the Mirror, published in 1976.

In the years leading up to Marx's death, Fleming was Groucho's guardian until a court appointed Groucho's friend, screenwriter Nat Perrin, in May 1977, in the midst of a contentious court case with Groucho's heirs.

Groucho Marx died on August 19, 1977, aged 86. Litigation over his estate was eventually resolved in 1988 in favor of his three children: daughters Miriam and Melinda and son Arthur Marx. Fleming was ordered to repay $472,000 which she had fraudulently taken from Groucho's estate.

== Later life and death ==
By 1983, Fleming was diagnosed with paranoid schizophrenia. She was arrested in June 1990 on suspicion of carrying a concealed loaded firearm, which she brought into the West Hollywood sheriff's office. She spent much of the last decade of her life impoverished, homeless, delusional, and in and out of various psychiatric facilities.

Fleming died of a self inflicted gunshot wound in Hollywood on April 15, 2003, at age 61. She was cremated and her ashes interred in Hornings Mills Cemetery, Horning's Mills, Ontario.

== Legacy ==
In a 1993 television adaptation of A Stranger in the Mirror, Lori Loughlin performed the role inspired by Fleming.

== Filmography ==
- The Legend of Blood Mountain (1965) - Phyllis Stinson
- Hercules in New York (1970)
- Conquest of the Planet of the Apes (1972) - Cafe Customer (uncredited)
- Everything You Always Wanted to Know About Sex* (*But Were Afraid to Ask) (1972) - The Girl
- Sheila Levine Is Dead and Living in New York (1975) - Girl
- McCullough's Mountain (1975) - Phyllis Stinson

=== Television ===
- The Dick Cavett Show (December 16, 1971 – 1972) - Herself
- Adam-12 (Episode: "Venice Division", 1973) - Suzanne Martin

== Sources ==
- Miriam Marx Allen, Love, Groucho: Letters from Groucho Marx to His Daughter Miriam (1992), ISBN 978-0306811036.
- Charlotte Chandler, Hello, I Must Be Going: Groucho and His Friends (1978), ISBN 978-1416544227.
- Stefan Kanfer, Groucho: The Life and Times of Julius Henry Marx (2000), ISBN 978-0375702075.
- Arthur Marx, My Life with Groucho (1992), revised from Life with Groucho (1954), ISBN 978-0942637458.
- Steve Stoliar, Raised Eyebrows: My Years Inside Groucho's House (1996), ISBN 978-1593936525.
