= John Mosher (writer) =

American short story writer and film critic (1892–1942)

- Born: John Chapin Mosher; June 2, 1892; Ogdensburg, New York, United States
- Died: September 3, 1942 (aged 50); New York City, New York, United States
- Education: Williams College
- Occupation(s): Short story writer, Film critic
- Known for: Works with The New Yorker

John Chapin Mosher (June 2, 1892 – September 3, 1942) was an American short story writer as well as the first regularly assigned film critic for The New Yorker, a position he held from 1928 to 1942.

== Life and career ==
Mosher was born in Ogdensburg, New York, and graduated from Williams College in Massachusetts in 1914. Moving to New York City in 1915, he joined the editorial staff of the general interest magazine Every Week and became involved in the Greenwich Village theater community, writing the one-act comedy plays Sauce for the Emperor and Bored, which were staged by the Provincetown Players in 1916–17. During the First World War Mosher served in the shell shock ward of a U.S. Medical Corps hospital in Portsmouth, England.

After the war, Mosher traveled around Europe and wrote various freelance articles for magazines before becoming an English instructor at Northwestern University in Evanston, Illinois. In 1926 he joined the staff of The New Yorker, initially contributing short stories. In the earliest historical chronicle of the magazine published in 1951, Mosher was credited as "a pioneer of the New Yorker short story." He became the magazine's resident film critic starting with the September 22, 1928 issue. According to The New York Times, Mosher's writings "had a personal note and were noteworthy for their humor and bristling style", while The New Yorker stated he "wrote with restraint and was never dull." In addition to writing, Mosher read the magazine's unsolicited manuscripts.

In 1940, a compilation of Mosher's New Yorker fiction was published in a book titled Celibate at Twilight and Other Stories. A number of these stories, featuring a wealthy, middle-aged bachelor named Mr. Opal, capture 1930s community life on Fire Island, where Mosher was among the earliest gay property owners in Cherry Grove. Mosher's final New Yorker column ran in the June 20, 1942 issue; he died less than three months later in New York City of heart disease at the age of 50. The magazine eulogized him as "witty, perceptive, and influenced by a deep and tolerant knowledge of the world" and "one of the most delightful companions we have ever known."
