= Hooray for Captain Spaulding =

Song composed by Bert Kalmar

Song
- Composers: Bert Kalmar and Harry Ruby

"Hooray for Captain Spaulding" is a song composed by Bert Kalmar and Harry Ruby, originally from the 1928 Marx Brothers Broadway musical Animal Crackers and the 1930 film version. It later became well known as the theme song for the Groucho Marx television show You Bet Your Life (1950–1961), and became Groucho's signature tune and was usually played when he was introduced on various talk shows and the like.

The modern version of the situation comedy radio show Flywheel, Shyster, and Flywheel uses this song for its opening theme.

The line "I think I'll try to make her" from the musical, included in the initial release, was cut from rereleases, being considered too risqué.

In 1951, Groucho Marx recorded the song for release by Decca Records.

== Chorus ==
The song is a series of rhyming gags but ends with a loud repeated chorus that drown out the captain's attempts to speak.

Hooray for Captain Spaulding,

The African explorer.

He brought his name undying fame

And that is why we say,

Hooray, Hooray, Hooray.
