= Kalmar and Ruby =

Songwriting partnership between Bert Kalmar and Harry Ruby

Kalmar and Ruby refers to the famous songwriting team of the first half of the 20th century of Bert Kalmar and Harry Ruby. Among the songs they wrote were the major hits "I Wanna Be Loved by You" and "Who's Sorry Now?"

== Bert Kalmar ==
Bert Kalmar was born on February 10, 1884, and died on September 18, 1947. He was an American lyricist. Born in New York, New York, Kalmar ran away from home at the age of 10 to become a magician at a tent show, and retained an interest in magic all his life. He never got much of an education, but decided to make a career in show business. He earned enough money as a vaudeville performer to start a music publishing company called Kalmar and Puck.

== Harry Ruby ==
Harry Ruby was born on October 29, 1895, and died on February 23, 1974. Like Kalmar, Ruby was also born in New York City. Ruby failed in his early ambition of becoming a professional baseball player. Touring the vaudeville circuit as a pianist with the Bootblack Trio and the Messenger Boys Trio he met his long-time partner Bert Kalmar.

== Partnership ==
Kalmar hired Ruby as a "song plugger", and as a result of a knee injury that stopped him from dancing professionally, turned to writing songs full-time. Ruby, who had gotten a job at the firm of Waterson, Berlin and Snyder, got Kalmar a job at the same firm writing song lyrics. Before World War I, he had begun to write lyrics for a number of different composers. One of them, Ruby, who had also had a number of collaborators, saw a strong compatibility between the two, and by 1920, Kalmar and Ruby recognized that they should form a permanent songwriting team. They also wrote comedy for stage and screen for Wheeler & Woolsey, Eddie Cantor and the Marx Brothers.

Together, Kalmar and Ruby formed a successful team until Kalmar's death in 1947. This partnership is portrayed in the 1950 Metro-Goldwyn-Mayer musical Three Little Words starring Fred Astaire and Red Skelton.

== Film credits ==
- Animal Crackers (1930)
- Check and Double Check (1930)
- Horse Feathers (1932)
- The Kid from Spain (1932)
- Duck Soup (1933)
- Hips Hips Hooray (1934)
- Kentucky Kernels (1935)
- Bright Lights (1935)
- Walking on Air (1936)
