= Girls of France =

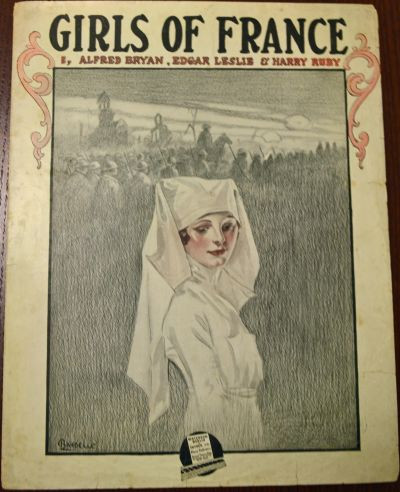
- Found at Pritzker Military Museum & Library.

Song
- Language: English
- Released: 1917
- Label: Waterson, Berlin & Snyder, Co.
- Songwriter(s): Composer: Harry Ruby; Lyricist: Al Bryan and Edgar Leslie

"Girls of France" is a World War I era song released in 1917. Al Bryan and Edgar Leslie wrote the lyrics. Harry Ruby composed the music. The song was published by Waterson, Berlin & Snyder Co. of New York, New York. Artist Albert Wilfred Barbelle designed the sheet music cover. It features a nurse in the foreground, and soldiers marching behind her. It was written for both voice and piano.

The lyrics claim that French girls were only thought of as "something to fondle and then to forget," but their actions during the war has proven this wrong. The chorus is as follows:

Girls of France, girls of France,
We're mighty proud of you;
When shadows fell and all was dark
You led your sons like Joan of Arc.
We know our brothers will never fell blue,
They'll find a sister in each of you.
Brave and true,
Beautiful, too,
Wonderful girls of France.

The sheet music can be found at Pritzker Military Museum & Library.
