= Take Your Girlie to the Movies =

1919 song

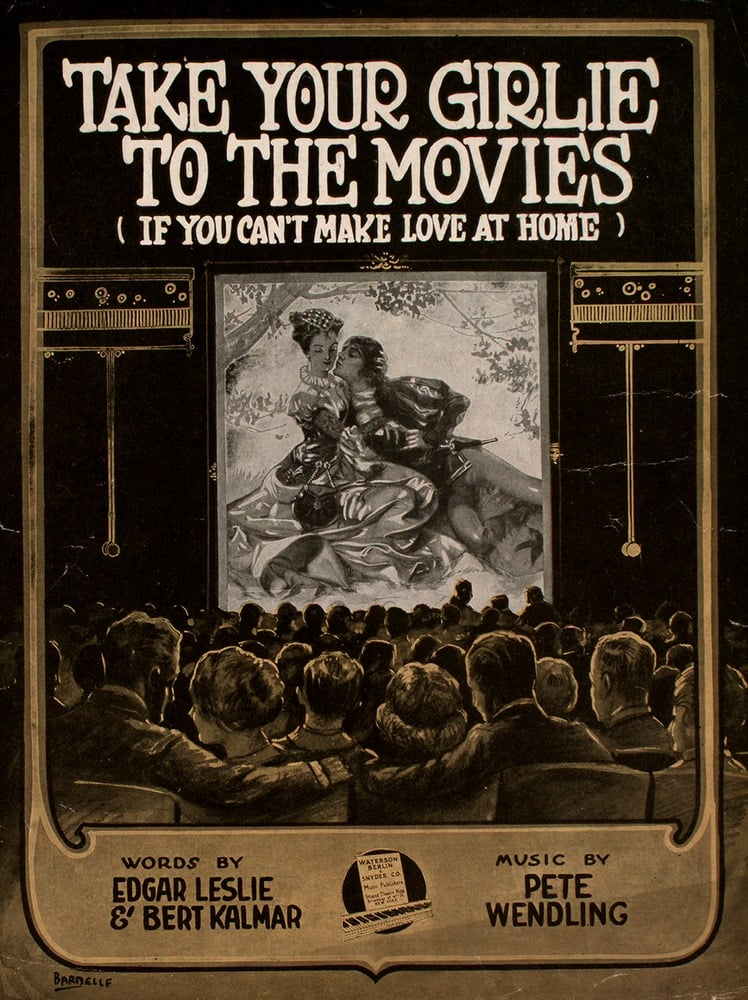
Illustrated cover of sheet music

"Take Your Girlie to the Movies (If You Can't Make Love at Home)" is an American popular song from 1919 with words by Edgar Leslie and Bert Kalmar and music by Pete Wendling. The song celebrates going on dates to movie theaters, which was a new practice in 1919.

Sheet music for the song with cover art by Albert Barbelle depicting couples in a darkened movie theater was sold by Waterson, Berlin & Snyder. The song has been recorded by Irving Kaufman, Tennessee Ernie Ford, and others. It made appearances on the vaudeville stage.

== Context ==
Prior to World War I courtship between men and woman was typically supervised by the woman's family, a system known as "calling." With the war's end in 1918 and the women's suffrage amendment of 1919, American young women gained more independence from their families. Dating replaced calling as courtship moved out of women's homes and away from family supervision, into public places including theaters and other entertainment venues.

The song capitalized on the new trend of dates in movie theaters, often showing movies with romantic themes. It came during a moral panic about the darkness of movie theaters and about the content of films, such as "women consorting with men without marriage," which censors considered salacious and immoral.

Influenza is referenced in the song because crowds were returning to movie theaters after the 1918 influenza epidemic.

== Lyrics ==
The song recommends the freedom of dating at the movies and suggests imitating actors in romantic films:

Take your girlie to the movies
If you can't make love at home
There's no little brother there who always squeals
You can say an awful lot in seven reels
Take your lessons at the movies
And have love scenes of your own

== Performances and recordings ==
Vaudeville performers Edna Goodrich and Harry Watson Jr. featured the song in 1919 and into the 1920s. It was performed in Sydney, Australia by Muriel Hudson, who included special effects. The Four Tops performed it on television in 1971.

A recording by Irving Kaufman was released in 1919 by Columbia Records. Recordings by Isabella Patricola and Billy Murray were also released in 1919. It was recorded by Kay Kyser in 1935, by Blue Barron in 1940, by Phil Harris in 1954, and by Tennessee Ernie Ford in 1962.
