= Ruby Brooks =

American banjo musician (1861–1906)

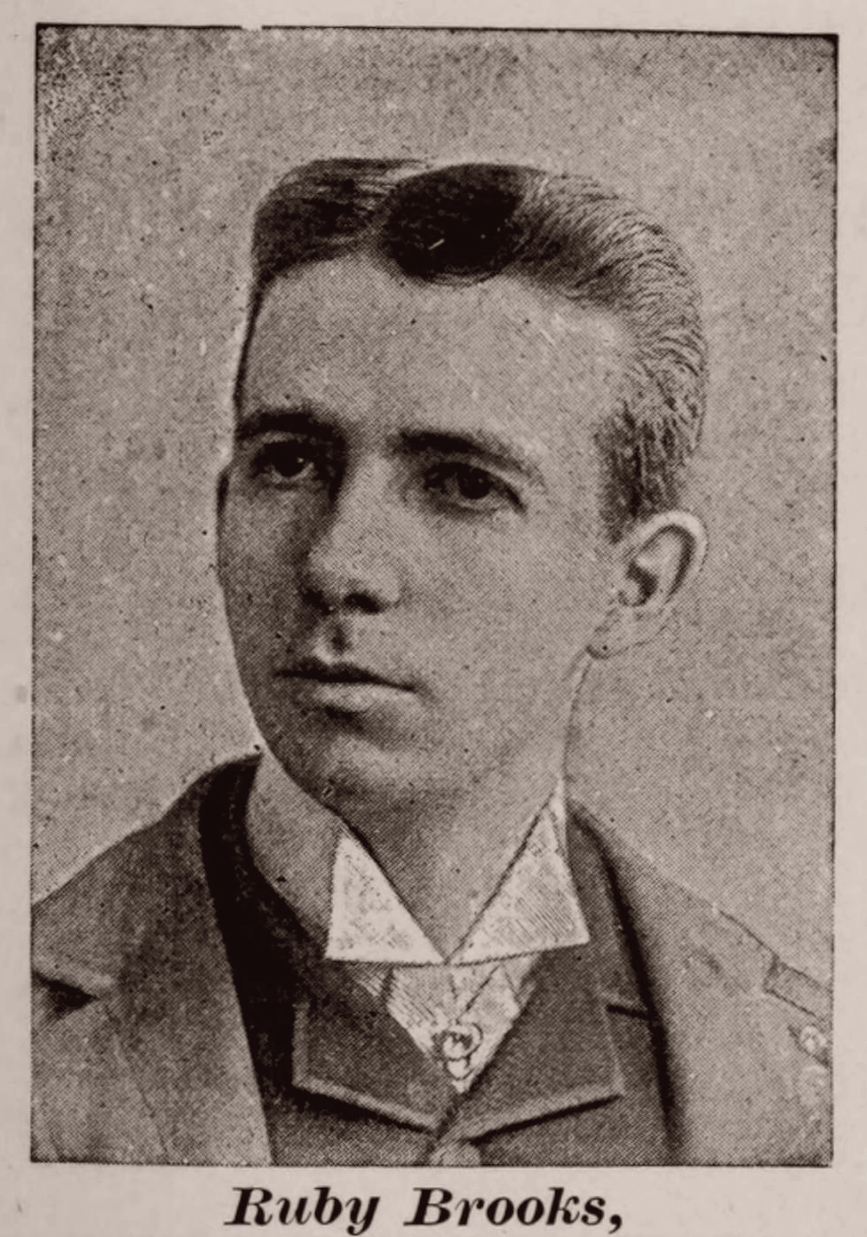
Banjoist Ruby Brooks in 1892

So Long Oo-Long (How Long You Gonna Be Gone?) - played by the Van Eps Quartet. Original music by Harry Ruby and Bert Kalmar. Arranged for banjo by Ruby Brooks.

The Stars And Stripes Forever March, played by Ruby Brooks on banjo, 1902

Ruby Brooks (September 12, 1861 – February 10, 1906) was an American banjoist, composer, and pioneer recording artist, sometimes called "King of Banjoists." He was influential on later banjo players such as Fred Van Eps.

== Biography ==
Reuben R. Brooks was born in Stamford, Connecticut in 1861. He taught himself to play the banjo, receiving no formal instruction. He became famous in 1887 when he performed and won at that year's banjo "Championship of the World" held in Chickering Hall, New York City. There he met and formed a partnership with the runner-up, Harry M. Denton.

=== Brooks and Denton ===
They formed the "Brooks & Denton Publishing Co." and citing "of Brooks and Denton" even on his solo recordings.

=== Performances ===
He gave concerts (often at Chickering Hall) and played in society programs regularly beginning in the late 1880s, performing in many varieties ranging from the latest vaudeville tunes to attempts at serious classical music. He repeated as champion at Chickering Hall in 1888 and 1889. He made three separate European tours, performing for various royalty including the Prince of Wales (the future King Edward VII), who was also a banjo player of some skill. By the late 1890s he had mostly ceased to perform in public, finding it more lucrative to give private lessons to wealthy students and to make recordings for the developing phonograph industry. Mr. Brooks recorded regularly for Edison from the late 1890s until his death in New York City in 1906 of throat cancer.

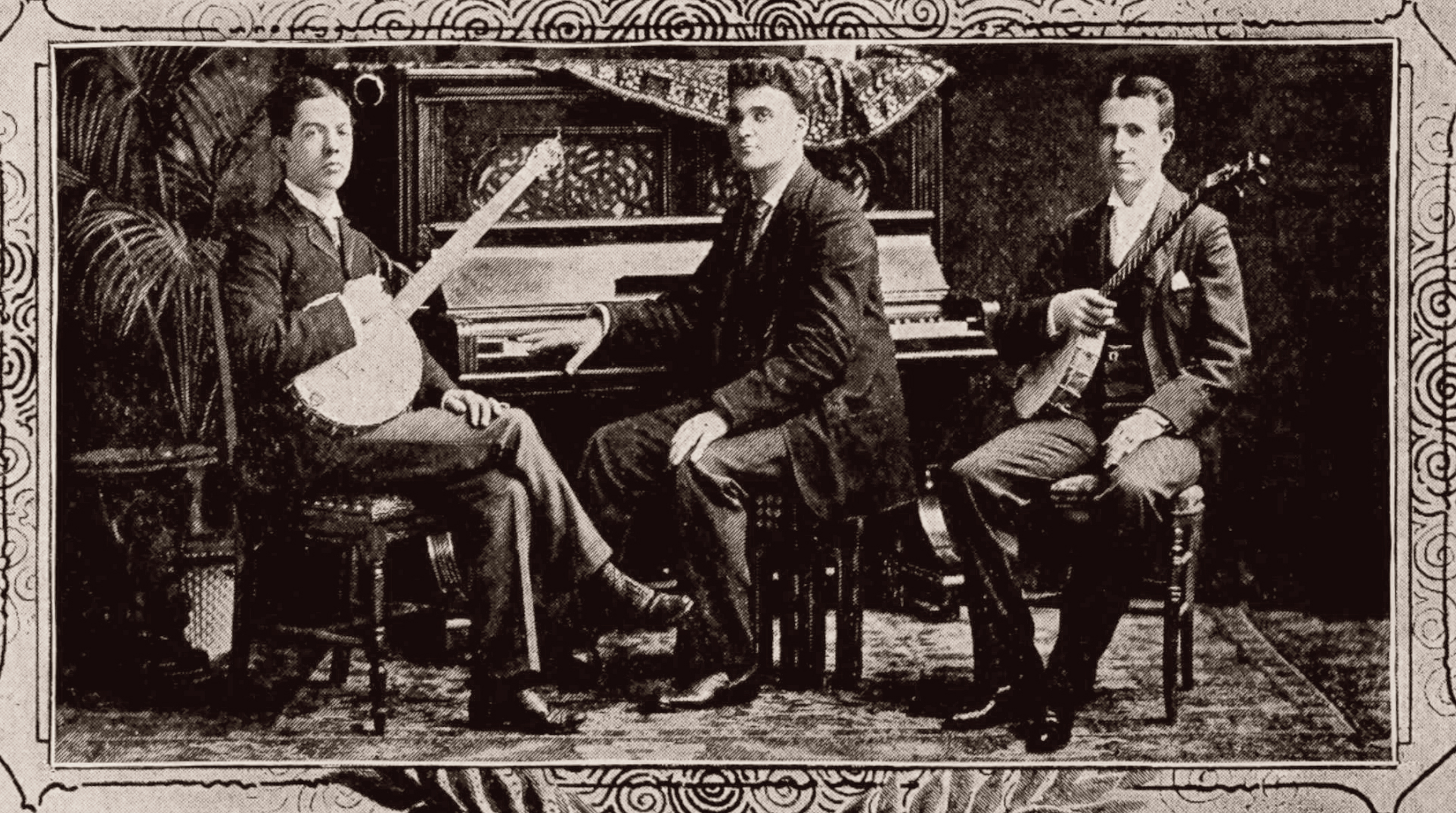
Brooks and Denton with piano accompanist J. Alex. Silberberg in 1892

== Reception ==
Although an influence on Fred Van Eps, he is considered by Kaufman and Winans to be inferior to that player, as well as his contemporaries Vess Ossman and Olly Oakley.

== Partial list of compositions ==
- "The Belle of Columbia"
- "Honor Bright"
- "University March"
- "White Star Line"

== Partial discography ==
Happy Days In Dixie, played by Ruby Brooks on banjo, 1905

The Darkies Dream, played by Ruby Brooks on banjo, 1898

Medley of "Coon Songs" played by Ruby Brooks, 1897-1898

Rag Time Medley (banjoist Ruby Brooks with pianist Frank P. Banta) 1899

Columbia Records

- 254 – The Mosquito Parade (1901)
- 255 – Tell Me Pretty Maiden from "Florodora" (1901)
- 289 – Valse Bleue (1901)
- 293 – Senegambian (1901)

Edison Records

- 2605 – Darkies Dream
- 2606 – Darkey Tickle
- 2608 – Darkies Patrol
- 2617 – In Old Madrid (re-made 1902)
- 2632 – The Stars and Stripes Forever March (re-made 1902)

Zonophone Records

- 1826 (7") – Tell Me Pretty Maiden from "Florodora" (1902)
- P813 (9") – Tell Me Pretty Maiden from "Florodora" (1902)
