= The Dixie Volunteers =

Song
- Language: English
- Published: 1917
- Songwriters: Edgar Leslie and Harry Ruby

"The Dixie Volunteers" is a World War I song written and composed by Edgar Leslie and Harry Ruby. This song was published in 1917 by Waterson, Berlin & Snyder Co., in New York, NY. The sheet music cover, illustrated by Barbelle, features soldiers marching with an inset photo of Eddie Cantor.

The song was written to pay homage to the southern soldiers in the American army who were headed to France. It became notably popular, because it was performed by Eddie Cantor in the Ziegfeld Follies.

The sheet music can be found at the Pritzker Military Museum & Library.

== Bibliography ==
- Cox, Karen L. Dreaming of Dixie: How the South Was Created in American Popular Culture. Chapel Hill: University of North Carolina Press, 2011. ISBN 9780807834718. OCLC 668197744
- Parker, Bernard S. World War I Sheet Music 1. Jefferson: McFarland & Company, Inc., 2007. ISBN 978-0-7864-2798-7. OCLC 71790113
- Vogel, Frederick G. World War I Songs: A History and Dictionary of Popular American Patriotic Tunes, with Over 300 Complete Lyrics. Jefferson: McFarland & Company, Inc., 1995. ISBN 0-89950-952-5. OCLC 32241433
