= Check and Double Check =

1930 film

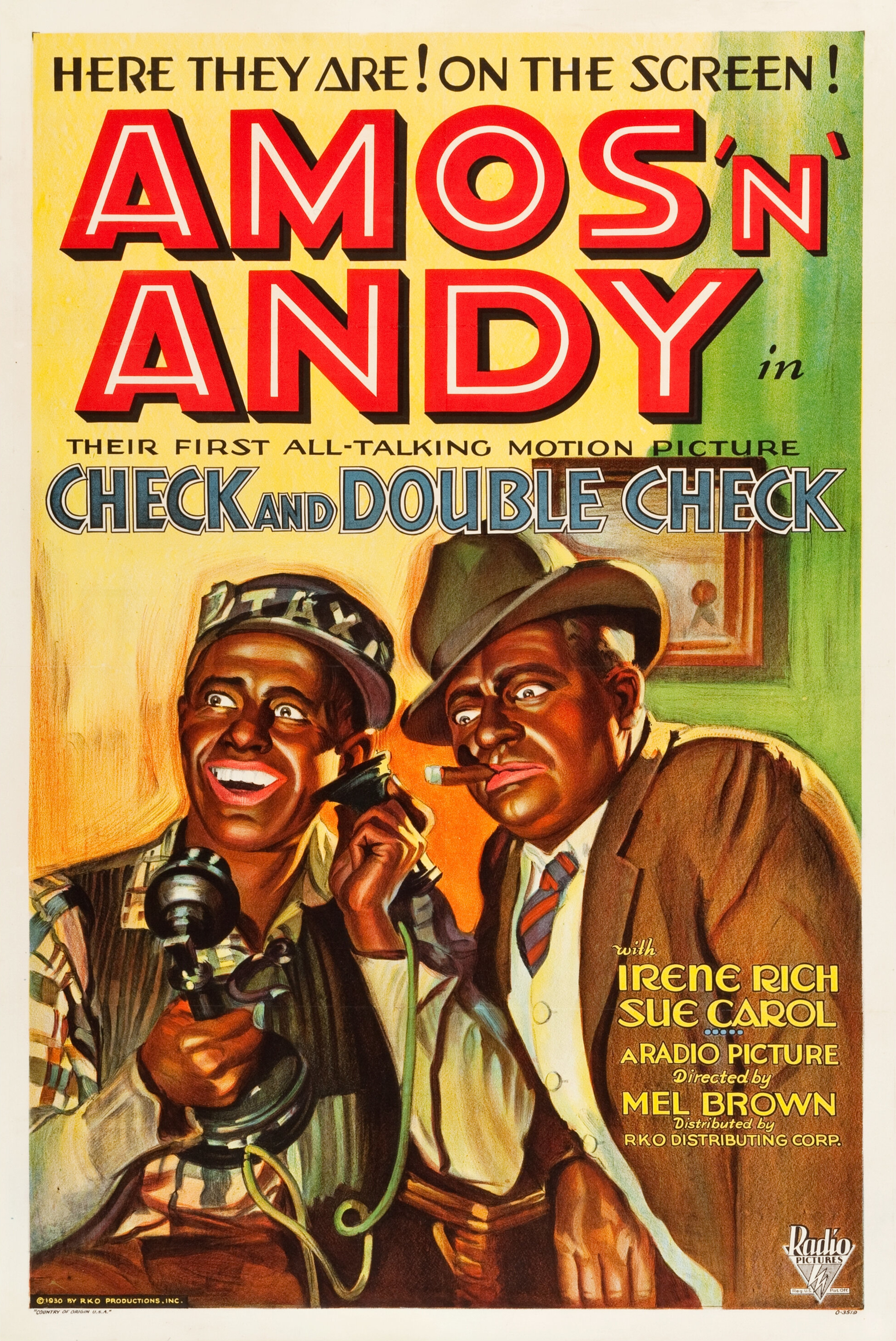
- Theatrical release poster
- Directed by: Melville W. Brown
- Written by: Bert Kalmar; J. Walter Ruben; Harry Ruby
- Produced by: William LeBaron
- Starring: Charles Correll; Freeman Gosden
- Cinematography: William Marshall
- Edited by: Claude Berkeley
- Production company: RKO Radio Pictures
- Distributed by: RKO Radio Pictures
- Release date: October 25, 1930
- Running time: 77 mins.
- Country: United States
- Language: English
- Budget: $967,000
- Box office: $1,810,000

Check and Double Check

Check and Double Check is a 1930 American pre-Code comedy film produced and released by RKO Radio Pictures, based on the Amos 'n' Andy radio show. The title was derived from a catchphrase associated with the show. Directed by Melville W. Brown, from a screenplay by Bert Kalmar, J. Walter Ruben, and Harry Ruby, it starred Freeman Gosden and Charles Correll in blackface, in the roles of Amos Jones and Andy Brown, respectively, which they had created for the radio show. The film also featured Duke Ellington and his Cotton Club Orchestra.

== Plot ==
Amos and Andy run the "Fresh Air Taxicab Company, Incorpulated" [sic], so named because their one taxi has no top. Their old vehicle has broken down, causing a traffic jam. Stuck in the traffic jam are John Blair and his wife, who were on their way to meet an old family friend, Richard Williams, at the train station. When the Blairs don't show up, Williams makes his own way to their house and meets their daughter, Jean, who was also his childhood sweetheart. The two reignite their old flame, much to the chagrin of Ralph Crawford, who has been attempting to woo Jean himself.

That night, Amos and Andy plan to attend a meeting at their lodge, the Mystic Knights of the Sea. Brother member Kingfish hires them to transport Duke Ellington and his Cotton Club band to a party being given at the Blair estate. Meanwhile, Richard confides to John Blair his feelings for his daughter, and states that he has no intention of pursuing Jean unless he can afford to start his own business to support them. Richard's family lost all their money after the death of his father. Richard's grandfather used to own a large home in Harlem, and Richard hopes to find the deed to it, so that he can sell it for the capital needed to start his business. He thinks the deed must be hidden somewhere on the property itself. Unknown to Blair or Richard, Ralph is eavesdropping on their conversation.

Richard runs into Amos and Andy, who used to work for his father down south, and they are all happy to see one another. Having delivered their fare, the two cab drivers rush back to town to attend their lodge meeting. The lodge has an annual tradition where a pair of members must spend a night in a haunted house in Harlem and find a document, labeled "Check and Double Check." Once they find it, they are to replace it, in a different location, with their own version, for the lodge members to find the following year. The haunted house in question is none other than the house previously owned by Richard's grandfather.

As Amos and Andy are searching for their document, Ralph is also in the house with several of his cohorts, searching for the deed, in order to thwart Richard's chances with Jean. Amos and Andy find their document, but then realize they didn't bring any other paper to write their message to their lodge brothers. In searching for something to write on, they stumble on the deed to premises. As they are about to write their message on the back, they are interrupted by Ralph and his friends, who believe that the two have found the deed. In the confusion which ensues, the cab drivers hand over what everyone believes is the deed, before they scamper out of the building. However, when they return to the lodge, they realize that they had given the "Check and Double Check" paper to Ralph, instead of the deed. They don't know the importance of the document they have, but they recognized Richard's grandfather's signature on it, and intend to deliver it to Richard the following day.

After failing to find the deed, a heartbroken Richard leaves for the railway station, intending to return home. Amos and Andy arrive at the Blair house too late to give him the deed, but race to the station and are able to hand over the deed just before Richard's train leaves. Now with the deed, Richard can sell the house, open his business, and marry Jean.

== Cast ==
- Freeman F. Gosden as Amos
- Charles J. Correll as Andy Brown
- Sue Carol as Jean Blair
- Irene Rich as Mrs. Blair
- Ralf Harolde as Ralph Crawford
- Charles Morton as Richard Williams
- Edward Martindel as John Blair
- Rita La Roy as Elinor Crawford
- Russ Powell as Kingfish
- Roscoe Ates as Brother Arthur
- Duke Ellington as himself
- Robert Homans as butler
- Müfit Kiper as Gunner
- Kani Kıpçak as Dr. Kay

(Cast list as per AFI database)

== Production ==
The making of the picture posed several problems. Perhaps foremost was that the characters of the program were portrayed as African Americans but were in fact entirely voiced by whites. This had posed no problem on the radio, but obviously would not be suitable for a film where the actors could be seen as well as heard. Rather than hire black actors for the roles and instruct them to imitate the stereotypical voices used by the radio performers, program creators Freeman Gosden and Charles Correll performed the roles themselves in blackface.

Another problem was the attempt to base a full-length picture on a 15-minute-long radio program. The film's producers decided to flesh out the story with a love triangle involving white characters, essentially making Amos and Andy minor characters in what was marketed as a film about them.

=== Music ===
Duke Ellington and his band were invited to be a part of the film, not just to provide the music but also to appear performing in the film itself. This helped propel Ellington into a national spotlight.

The director did not want to give audiences the impression that Ellington's band was racially integrated, and was worried that two band members were too light-skinned. So valve trombonist Juan Tizol, who was Puerto Rican, and clarinetist Barney Bigard, a Creole, wore stage makeup to appear as dark as Amos and Andy on film.

The songs included:

- "Three Little Words" – Music by Harry Ruby, lyrics by Bert Kalmar; performed by Duke Ellington and His Cotton Club Band, vocals by The Rhythm Boys (Bing Crosby, Harry Barris and Al Rinker) (band members lip synched to the Rhythm Boys vocals)
- "Nobody Knows But the Lord" – Music by Harry Ruby, lyrics by Bert Kalmar; sung by lodge brothers
- "Ring Dem Bells" – Written by Duke Ellington; performed by Duke Ellington and His Cotton Club Band
- "Old Man Blues" – Written by Duke Ellington and Irving Mills; performed by Duke Ellington and His Cotton Club Band
- "East St. Louis Toodle-Oo" – Written by James "Bubber" Miley and Duke Ellington
- "Am I Blue?" – Music by Harry Akst, lyrics by Grant Clarke; partially sung by Freeman F. Gosden
- "The Perfect Song" – Words and music by Joseph Carl Breil; theme from the Amos 'n' Andy radio program

The Rhythm Boys (Bing Crosby, Harry Barris, and Al Rinker) were brought in at the last minute to sing the vocals on "Three Little Words", when Ellington's drummer, Sonny Greer, got stage fright about performing on film. Bing Crosby was supposed to sing the song solo, but when director Melville Brown heard Crosby's version, he reportedly said, "This guy can't sing", and the entire trio was brought in to record the song.

== Response ==
The film was profitable for RKO, earning a profit of $260,000. However, Amos 'n' Andy had no future with the studio, and were branded a freak attraction good for one film only. RKO had examined ticket-sale patterns, and determined that audiences had only been curious about seeing their two radio favorites. Once seen, their novelty and appeal were gone.

Variety called it "the best picture for children ever put on the screen". Mordaunt Hall, film critic for The New York Times, gave the film a lackluster review, praising the efforts of Gosden and Correll, while not being as kind to the rest of the cast. Gosden and Correll were themselves ashamed of the film, with Gosden calling it "just about the worst movie ever," but it didn't hurt their continued popularity on radio.

RKO did release two short subjects related to the Amos 'n' Andy franchise. These were animated cartoons produced by The Van Beuren Corporation in 1934: The Rasslin' Match and The Lion Tamer. Freeman Gosden and Charles Correll recorded their own dialect voices for the soundtracks. However, the projected series ended after only the two films. Gosden and Correll made one more motion-picture appearance (as guest stars in The Big Broadcast of 1936), but there were no further attempts at live-action portrayals of Amos 'n' Andy until the Amos 'n' Andy television show (1951–1953), although the radio show continued to be a top-rated program throughout the 1930s and 1940s.

== Revivals ==
In 1955 the RKO film library was sold to C&C Television Corporation, which syndicated 16mm film prints to local television stations. Included in the package was Check and Double Check, which was telecast through the rest of the decade and into the 1960s while Amos 'n' Andy still had a following on television. After the TV show was withdrawn due to civil-rights considerations, most local stations owning the RKO library opted to withdraw Check and Double Check as well.

In 1958, the film entered the public domain in the United States because the claimants did not renew its copyright registration in the 28th year after publication. Because of the film's copyright-free status, film merchants copied C&C Television prints of Check and Double Check for the home-movie market, and later for home video.

== See also ==
- List of films in the public domain in the United States
