= The Lion Tamer =

1934 film by Vernon Stallings

- Directed by: Vernon Stallings
- Produced by: Amandee J. Van Buren
- Starring: Charles J. Correll and Freeman F. Gosden
- Music by: Winston Sharples
- Production company: The Van Beuren Corporation
- Distributed by: RKO Radio Pictures
- Release date: 1934
- Country: United States
- Language: English

The Lion Tamer is a 1934 animated short film produced by the Van Beuren Studios and directed by Vernon Stallings and starring Charles J. Correll and Freeman F. Gosden as the voices of their popular radio characters, Amos 'n' Andy. It was one of two such films made that year, the other being The Rasslin' Match. These two shorts and the 1930 live-action film Check and Double Check constitute the only visual representations of Amos 'n' Andy prior to the advent of network television.

== Story ==
Kingfish talks Andy into being a lion tamer at a carnival. Andy decides against it until Kingfish tells him that it is a fake lion, at which Andy agrees. There is a real lion there but the "lion" that Andy is to "tame" is Crawford in front and Lightning in back in a lion skin. In a cage Andy struts his stuff with a whip while an obviously fake lion tries to avoid the stinging blows (with Crawford sticking his head out of the lion's mouth and telling Andy to be careful with that whip). The crowd (all black people) cheer throughout.

The real lion meanwhile chews through its restraining rope and trails Andy, whom it saw earlier. While Andy is looking elsewhere, the real lion changes places with the fake lion (which promptly runs off into the distance). Andy starts flicking his whip again while Amos who is outside the cage tries to warn him that he now faces the real lion. The lion gets upset and Andy then decides to put his head inside the lion's mouth. Opening it, he sees a large tongue instead of Crawford and realizes that it is the real lion.

A fight ensues, hidden by clouds of dust and debris flying, and Amos manages to get Andy out of the cage. When the smoke clears, the triumphant lion is wearing Andy's bowler and smoking his cigar.
