= And He'd Say, "Oo-La-La! Wee-Wee!" =

"And He'd Say, 'Oo-La-La! Wee-Wee!'"
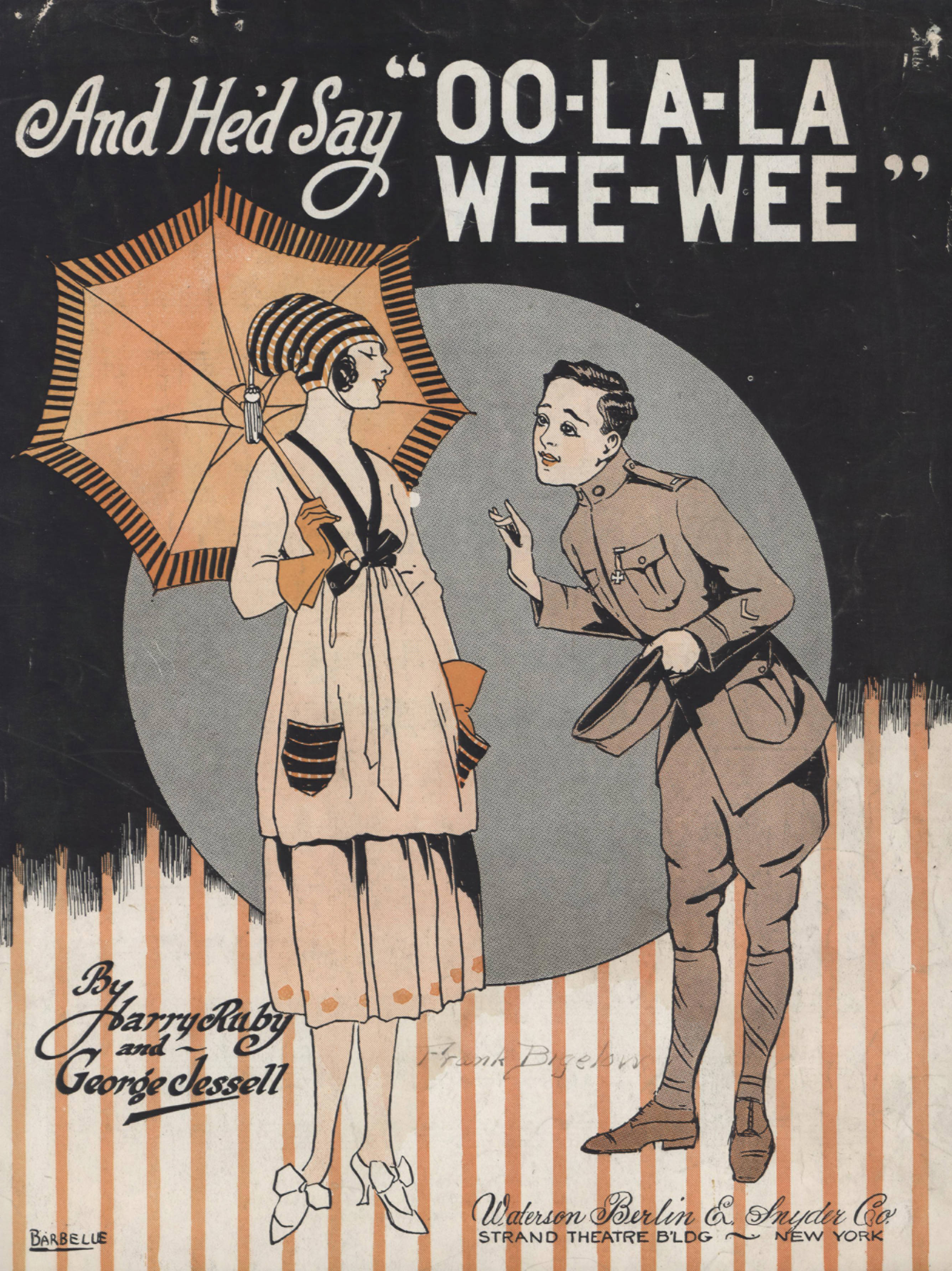
- Sheet music cover

Song by Billy Murray
- Released: 1919
- Recorded: August 12, 1919
- Genre: Jazz
- Length: 2:52
- Label: Victor
- Songwriter(s): George Jessel, Harry Ruby

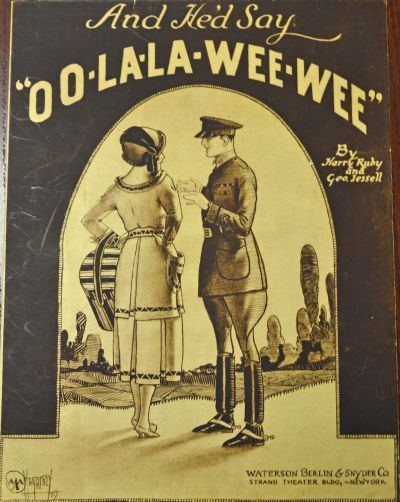
Found at Pritzker Military Museum & Library

"And He'd Say, 'Oo-La-La! Wee-Wee!'" is a World War I era song released in 1919. Lyrics and music were written by George Jessel and Harry Ruby. William Baker arranged the song. It was published by Waterson, Berlin & Snyder, Inc. of New York, New York. The song was written for voice and piano.

There are two versions of the sheet music cover. The first was designed by Albert Wilfred Barbelle. It features a soldier speaking to a woman with a parasol. The later edition was designed by Weatherly. This version shows a man and woman speaking under an arched doorway.

On August 12, 1919, Billy Murray recorded the song with conductor Rosario Bourdon. It was released under the Victor record label. It was in the top 20 songs from October 1919 to January 1920.

The sheet music can be found at Pritzker Military Museum & Library.

== Analysis ==
The song is about Willie Earl who falls in love with a French girl. The humor of the song lies in the fact that Willie only knows two words in French, "oo-la-la" and "wee-wee," which he repeats throughout the song. Despite the fact that Willie cannot speak French, the girl continues to try to communicate with him. The two choruses are as follows:

Chorus 1:
She'd say, "Compronay voo, papa?"
And he'd say, "Oo-la-la! wee-wee"
She'd smile and whisper, "Mercy bacoo"
He'd answer, "I don't mind if I do"
She'd say, "If you be my papa
Then I will be your ma cherie"
She'd pinch his cheek and say, "You keska say"
He'd say, "Not now, dear, but later I may"
Then she'd say, "Compronay voo, papa"
And he'd say, "Oo-la-la! wee-wee"

Chorus 2:
She'd say, "Compronay voo, papa?"
And he'd say, "Oo-la-la! wee-wee"
She'd say, "Come see" and then roll her eyes"
He'd answer, "Baby, you'd be surprised"
Each evening they would promenade
Upon ze boulevard, you see
One day at lunch, she said, "Café voo la"
He'd say, "My dear, don't forget where you are"
Then she'd say, "Compronay voo, papa?"
And he'd say, "Oo-la-la! wee-wee"
