= Hello, Hawaii, How Are You? =

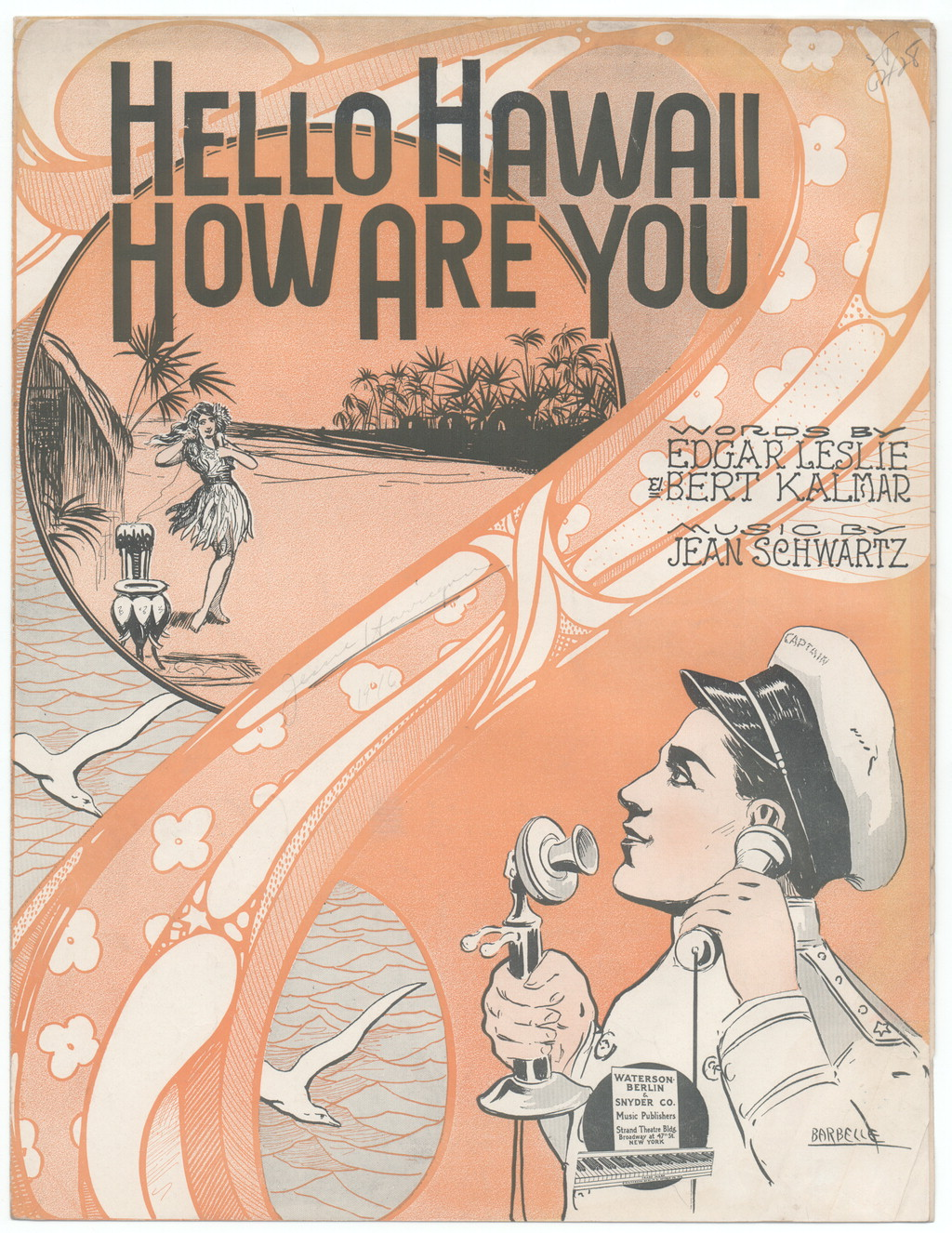
Sheet music cover, 1915

"Hello, Hawaii, How Are You?" is a song written in 1915, by Jean Schwartz, Bert Kalmar and Edgar Leslie.

The song was inspired by the American Telephone and Telegraph Company's recent successful radio (then commonly called "wireless") telephone transmission from the U.S. Navy's station, NAA in Arlington, Virginia, to Hawaii. This technology was still experimental, and the song underscores the caller's desperation to talk to their sweetheart in Hawaii, from their home in New York City.

The song was recorded in 1915 by Billy Murray, backed with an instrumental version by Pietro Deiro on Side B; and later that year by Broadway star Nora Bayes.

Murray's version of the chorus is given below;

Captain Jinks, one night on Broadway, all alone, Read the news about the wireless telephone. Pretty soon his thoughts began to stray, over seven thousand miles away. He went through a whole month's pay just to phone and say:

Hello, Hawaii, how are you?
Let me talk to Honolulu Lou
To ask her this
Give me a kiss
Give me a kiss
By wireless
Please state
I can't wait
To hear her reply
For I had to pawn
Ev'ry little thing I own
To talk from New York
Through the wireless telephone
Oh, Hello, Hawaii, how are you?
Good-bye!

In Murray's version, at least, "Hawaii" is pronounced in a slangy way, as "Hah-WAH-yah", playing on the "How are you?" line.
