= Come On Papa =

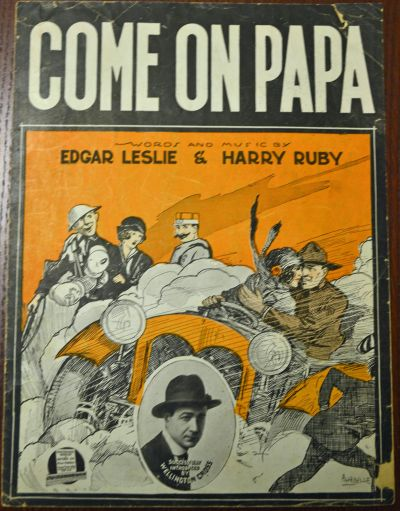
- Sheet music cover at the Pritzker Military Museum & Library

Song by Joseph C. Smith's Orchestra
- Published: 1918
- Recorded: New York City, January 30, 1919
- Genre: Pop
- Length: 3:00
- Label: Victor
- Composer(s): Harry Ruby
- Lyricist(s): Edgar Leslie

"Come On Papa" is a World War I era song released in 1918.

== Sheet music ==
Lyrics and music were written by Edgar Leslie and Harry Ruby. It was published by Waterson, Berlin & Snyder, Co. of New York, New York. Artist Albert Wilfred Barbelle designed the sheet music cover. It features a woman and an American soldier in an embrace, as the soldier is driving a car. A woman, soldier, and Frenchman look on, and a pedestrian runs out of the way. Below this image is an inset photo of Eddie Cantor. It states on the cover, "Successfully introduced by Wellington Cross." It was written for voice and piano. The sheet music can be found at Pritzker Military Museum & Library.

== Recordings ==
On January 30, 1919, Joseph C. Smith's Orchestra recorded the song in New York. It was released by Victor Records. The song also appeared in the 1950 film Three Little Words.

== Chorus ==
The song is about Sweet Marie in Paris. She likes to drive her car around and pick up Yankee boys. The chorus is as follows:

Come on papa
Hop in ze motor car
Sit by mama
And hold ze hand
You start to raise for me
What zay call ze deuce
I'll be so sweet to you
Like ze Charlotte Russe
Come on papa
Beneath the shining star
Bounce your babe upon your knee
I'll give you a kiss like ze mademoiselles do
Each time you ask for one
I'll give you two
Comme ci comme ca
And when you're in ze car
You love mama
Oo-la-la, Oo-la-la
Come on papa
