= The Man Who Put the Germ in Germany =

1918 song by Nora Bayes, Sam Downing and Abe Glatt

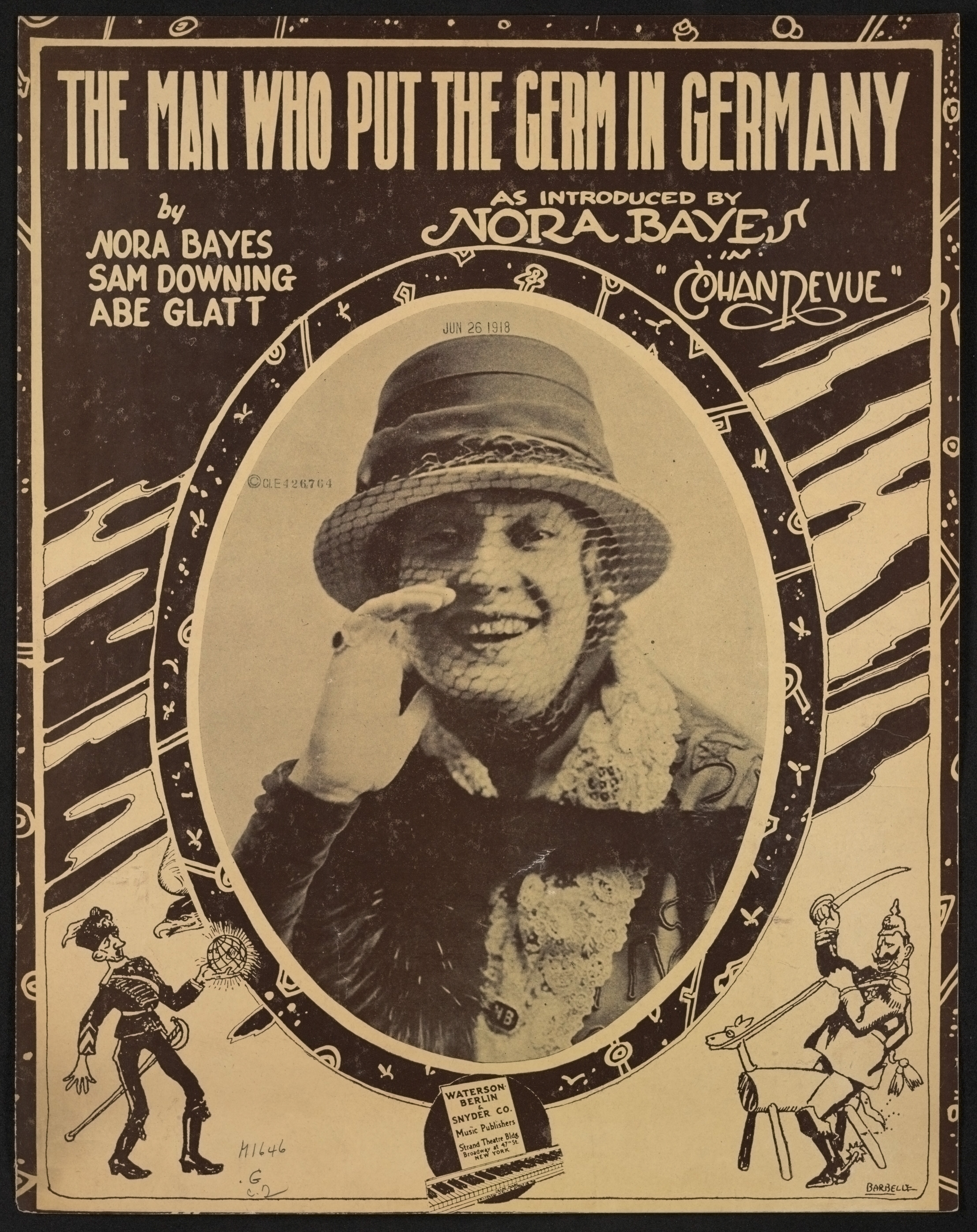
- Sheet music cover

Song
- Published: 1918
- Genre: Novelty song
- Label: Waterson, Berlin & Snyder, Inc.
- Songwriter(s): Nora Bayes, Sam Downing, and Abe Glatt

"The Man Who Put the Germ in Germany" is a song written in 1918 during World War I. Lyrics and music were composed by Nora Bayes, Sam Downing, and Abe Glatt. Waterson, Berlin & Snyder, Inc. of New York City published the song for both voice and piano. It reached number seven on the US song charts in August 1918.

On the cover of the sheet music is a large picture of Nora Bayes.

The song celebrates America by using word play of famous leaders' names like George Washington and Abraham Lincoln to highlight their achievements. For example, in the chorus:

And we love our Lincoln too,
for he "linked" the Gray and Blue,
And Washington "washed" tyranny away

The use of word play continues throughout the song, even to shine a negative light on Germany and its emperor during World War I, Wilhelm II. The lyrics read:

But the world is now a flame
At the "Hell" in Wilhelm's name,
The man who put the "Germ" in Germany
