= Ted Snyder =

American composer, lyricist, and music publisher

- Born: August 15, 1881; Freeport, Illinois, US
- Died: July 16, 1965 (aged 83); Woodland Hills, California, US
- Notable work: "The Sheik of Araby" (1921); "Who's Sorry Now?" (1923)
- Awards: Songwriters Hall of Fame

Theodore Frank Snyder (August 15, 1881 – July 16, 1965), was an American composer, lyricist, and music publisher. (Note: See Waterson, Berlin & Snyder, Inc.) His hits include "The Sheik of Araby" (1921) and "Who's Sorry Now?" (1923). In 1970, he was inducted into the Songwriters Hall of Fame. As of 2007, his compositions have been used in more than twenty motion pictures.

== Early life ==
Born in Freeport, Illinois, Snyder grew up in Boscobel, Wisconsin. He learned to play the piano as a boy and as a young man returned to Illinois to work in Chicago as a pianist in a café before being employed by a music publishing company.

== Career ==
"That Mysterious Rag"
A 1911 composition by Irving Berlin and Snyder. Performed by the Premier Quartette in the same year.

"Ramshackle Rag"
A 1911 composition by Snyder performed by Arthur Pryor's band in the same year, in an arrangement by William Schulz.

Snyder moved to New York in 1904 after working in Chicago plugging musical compositions.

In 1907, Snyder had his first musical composition published and the following year set up the Ted Snyder Company, his own music publishing business in New York City. He gave Irving Berlin his first break in 1909 when he hired him as a staff writer for his company and the two eventually became business partners. In 1914, Ted Snyder became one of the founding members of ASCAP.

Snyder's growing name as a top-line composer led to his compositions being used in stage plays with the first to make it to Broadway in 1908. Following his teaming up with Irving Berlin, the two were hired to perform and sing their music in the 1910 musical Up and Down Broadway. Snyder would become widely known to a later generation through hits such as 1921's "The Sheik of Araby" recorded by several artists including Duke Ellington (in 1932), Benny Goodman (in 1937), and The Beatles (in 1962, Decca Audition).

The most notable of Snyder's works is "Who's Sorry Now?" written in 1923 in collaboration with Bert Kalmar and Harry Ruby. "Who's Sorry Now?" became a No.1 hit on the UK Singles Chart for Connie Francis in 1958 and went to No. 4 on the American Billboard charts. In 2000, it was named one of the Songs of the Century by the Recording Industry Association of America.

In 1930, Snyder retired from the songwriting business and moved to California, where he opened a Hollywood nightclub. As of 2007, his compositions have been used in about twenty-two motion pictures from 1926's The Sheik of Araby, to the 1946's Marx Brothers' A Night in Casablanca, to 1979's All That Jazz, to 2002's The Good Girl.

== Death and legacy ==
Ted Snyder died in 1965 in Woodland Hills.

In 1970, he was inducted into the Songwriters Hall of Fame.

In 1985, the heirs to his music copyrights were party to Mills Music, Inc. v. Snyder.

== Work on Broadway ==
- Funabashi (1908), musical – contributing lyricist
- Up and Down Broadway (1910), musical – performer
- Fashions of 1924 (1924), revue – composer
- Fosse (1999), revue – featured songwriter for "Who's Sorry Now?"
