= United States v. Hensley =

- Supreme Court of the United States

Argued November 5, 1984 Decided January 8, 1985
- Full case name: United States v. Thomas Hensley.
- Citations: 469 U.S. 221 (more)
- Argument: Oral argument
- Decision: Opinion

Case history
- Prior: United States Court of Appeals for the Sixth Circuit reversal (713 F.2d 220 [1983])

Holding
- Absent an official arrest warrant, there is enough reasonable suspicion to detain a person for Terry stop purposes if they match a description of a suspect under investigation as detailed in a wanted poster.

Court membership
- Chief Justice Warren E. Burger Associate Justices William J. Brennan Jr. · Byron White; Thurgood Marshall · Harry Blackmun; Lewis F. Powell Jr. · William Rehnquist; John P. Stevens · Sandra Day O'Connor

Case opinions
- Majority: O'Connor, joined by unanimous
- Concurrence: Brennan

Laws applied
- U.S. Const. amend IV

United States v. Hensley, 469 U.S. 221 (1985), is a unanimous decision by the Supreme Court of the United States that ruled that wanted posters create reasonable suspicion to detain and identify suspects that match descriptions contained in those posters.

== Background ==
Six days after 2 men robbed a tavern in St. Bernard, Ohio on December 4, 1981, an informant told police that Thomas Hensley drove the robbery getaway car. Officer Kenneth Davis then immediately issued a wanted flyer for police departments in the Cincinnati metropolitan area. The Covington Police Department received the flyer on December 10, and began their search for Hensley.

Six days later, Covington Officer, Terence Eger, spotted a white Cadillac convertible idling in the middle of a street. Eger recognized the driver as Hensley after asking him to move along. Soon, Eger asked dispatchers if Hensley had an arrest warrant; two officers interrupted the call to posit that he had an arrest warrant out of Cincinnati (the officers testified that, in their experience, wanted posters in relation to investigations were followed by arrest warrants). As the dispatcher was checking for the warrant, one of the officers, Cope, pulled over the Cadillac on Holman Street. He performed a felony stop on the vehicle by ordering all occupants to step out of the car while pointing his service revolver in the air. The second officer, Rassache, recognized the car's passenger as a felon named Albert Green after he backed up Cope. After observing the open passenger door and spotting a pistol butt protruding from the passenger seat, Green was arrested. Hensley was arrested for illegal weapons possession after two more handguns were discovered as well.

Although the State of Kentucky dropped charges against him, a federal grand jury indicted Hensley for felon in possession of firearms charges. He unsuccessfully challenged the indictment based on allegations that the officers went beyond what was permissible in Terry v. Ohio. The Court for the Eastern District of Kentucky sentenced him to two years in prison.

=== Appeals ===
The United States Court of Appeals for the Sixth Circuit reversed Hensley's conviction by ruling that a wanted poster does not equate to an arrest warrant; nor does the presence of a wanted poster allow police to stop someone to check if a warrant was issued.

== Opinion of the Court ==
In a unanimous judgement delivered by Justice Sandra Day O'Connor, the Court ruled that based on factors such as the informant's detailed statement and the poster, the police had the right to briefly detain and question suspects in relation to completed crimes. Restricting actions to wait for probable cause would allow potentially dangerous criminals to escape.

=== Concurrence ===
Justice William J. Brennan Jr. concurred that while balancing tests would be needed for brief, less intrusive stops, Hensley's case would not apply as he was arrested based on probable cause from the sight of the weapons.
