= Three Little Words (song) =

1930 song by Ruby and Kalmar

Single by Duke Ellington and his Orchestra

from the album Three Little Words
- B-side: "Ring Dem Bells"
- Published: 1930
- Released: October 24, 1930
- Recorded: August 26, 1930
- Genre: jazz
- Label: Victor
- Composer: Harry Ruby
- Lyricist: Bert Kalmar

"Three Little Words" is a popular song with music by Harry Ruby and lyrics by Bert Kalmar, published in 1930.

The Rhythm Boys (including Bing Crosby), accompanied by the Duke Ellington orchestra, recorded it on August 26, 1930 and it enjoyed great success. Their version was used in the 1930 Amos 'n' Andy film Check and Double Check, with orchestra members miming to it. The film was co-written by Kalmar and Ruby along with J. Walter Ruben. The song also figured prominently in the film Three Little Words, a 1950 biopic about Kalmar and Ruby.

== Popular culture ==
- In the mid-1970s the Advertising Council used a fully orchestrated instrumental version of the song in a series of PSAs about seat belt safety; the tag line of these spots was "Seat belts: a nice way to say 'I Love You'."
- Between 1977 and 2002, the channel Saeta TV (Channel 10) from Montevideo, Uruguay had it as a musical curtain for the humor program Decalegrón (English: Ten Big Joy)
- Actress Judith Roberts sang the song in Woody Allen's 1980 film Stardust Memories.
