= Mills Music, Inc. v. Snyder =

- Supreme Court of the United States

Argued October 9, 1984 Decided January 8, 1985
- Full case name: Mills Music, Inc. v. Snyder
- Citations: 469 U.S. 153 (more) 105 S. Ct. 638; 83 L. Ed. 2d 556; 1985 U.S. LEXIS 32

Holding
- If the author of a work authorizes derivatives, the terms negotiated in exchange for that grant stand even if the grant is later rescinded. If the copyright holder deputizes another person to authorize derivative works, the law draws no distinction between such works and those directly authorized by the copyright holder.

Court membership
- Chief Justice Warren E. Burger Associate Justices William J. Brennan Jr. · Byron White; Thurgood Marshall · Harry Blackmun; Lewis F. Powell Jr. · William Rehnquist; John P. Stevens · Sandra Day O'Connor

Case opinions
- Majority: Stevens, joined by Burger, Powell, Rehnquist, O'Connor
- Dissent: White, joined by Brennan, Marshall, Blackmun

Mills Music, Inc. v. Snyder, 469 U.S. 153 (1985), was a United States Supreme Court case in which the Court held that if the author of a work authorizes derivatives, the terms negotiated in exchange for that grant stand even if the grant is later rescinded. If the copyright holder deputizes another person to authorize derivative works, the law draws no distinction between such works and those directly authorized by the copyright holder.

The case was a dispute regarding publishing royalties for the popular song "Who's Sorry Now?", which Mills Music had licensed (through mechanical licenses) to recording companies, who created records of the song, or derivative works; after the death of Ted Snyder, the song's composer, his heirs terminated the agreement with Mills Music. They believed that Mills was no longer entitled to its share in the royalties. Mills, through the Harry Fox Agency, sued in federal court in New York, where it won, but was overturned in the Second Circuit, before finally appealing to the Supreme Court, which granted certiorari in March 1984.
