= United States v. Maine =

- Supreme Court of the United States

Argued November 26, 1984 Decided February 19, 1985
- Full case name: United States v. Maine, et al.
- Citations: 469 U.S. 504 (more) 105 S. Ct. 992; 83 L. Ed. 2d 998; 1985 U.S. LEXIS 47; 53 U.S.L.W. 4151

Case history
- Prior: On Exception to Report of Special Master

Holding
- Long Island is an extension of the North American mainland and surrounding waters may therefore be controlled by the states.

Court membership
- Chief Justice Warren E. Burger Associate Justices William J. Brennan Jr. · Byron White; Thurgood Marshall · Harry Blackmun; Lewis F. Powell Jr. · William Rehnquist; John P. Stevens · Sandra Day O'Connor

Case opinion
- Majority: Blackmun, joined by unanimous

United States v. Maine, 469 U.S. 504 (1985), also known as the Rhode Island and New York Boundary Case, was a decision by the U.S. Supreme Court, which held (a) that Long Island Sound and Block Island Sound in part constitute a juridical bay under Article 7(6) of the Convention on the Territorial Sea and the Contiguous Zone, Long Island being an extension of the mainland and the southern headland of the bay, and (b) that the bay closed at the line drawn from Montauk Point at the eastern tip of Long Island to Watch Hill Point in Westerly, Rhode Island, (c) the waters of the bay west of the closing line being internal state (inland waters), and (d) the waters of Block Island Sound east of that line being territorial waters and high seas (international waters).

Maine is named in the title of the case because it is the northernmost of the thirteen defendant states with coastline on the Atlantic Ocean in a series of cases related to overlapping claims of state and federal jurisdiction over seas and the seafloor.

== Background ==
The federal government and the states did not agree on who controlled the Long Island and Block Island sounds. The states wanted control to regulate shipping and commerce on the sounds, and assert control over the seabed and its marine resources and minerals. The key to the case was if Long Island was, for legal purposes, an extension of the mainland or by the Convention an island. If it were considered an extension of the mainland, as the states argued, then the sounds would legally be inland bays controlled in relevant parts by the states, New York, Connecticut, or Rhode Island. If it were, for the Convention's purposes, an island, then the sounds would be considered open waters and be under federal control.

== Holding ==
The court ruled in favor of the states, determining that the waters of the East River which separates Long Island from the mainland at the Bronx were in the "shallowness and inutility" of their original state inadequate to permit suitable navigation until altered by human activity, and thus Long Island is not a natural island under the law.

Long Island and the adjacent shore also share a common geological history.

== See also ==
- List of United States Supreme Court cases, volume 469
- List of United States Supreme Court cases
- Lists of United States Supreme Court cases by volume
- List of United States Supreme Court cases by the Burger Court
