= Bright Lights (1935 film) =

1935 film by Busby Berkeley

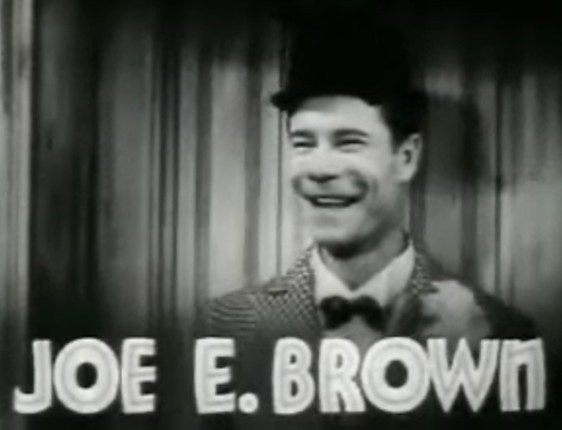
- Movie still
- Directed by: Busby Berkeley
- Written by: Bert Kalmar; Harry Ruby; Ben Markson; Benny Rubin; Mort Dixon; Story: Lois Leeson
- Produced by: Michael Curtiz
- Starring: Joe E. Brown; Ann Dvorak
- Cinematography: Sidney Hickox
- Edited by: Bert L'Orle
- Music by: Heinz Roemheld; Harry Ruby
- Production company: Warner Bros. Pictures
- Distributed by: Warner Bros. Pictures
- Release date: 27 July 1935 (U.S.)
- Running time: 83 minutes
- Country: United States
- Language: English

Bright Lights is a 1935 musical film directed by Busby Berkeley.

== Plot ==
Joe's happy marriage is threatened when an heiress falls in love with him.

== Cast ==
- Joe E. Brown as Joe Wilson
- Ann Dvorak as Fay Wilson
- Patricia Ellis as Claire Whitmore
- William Gargan as Dan Wheeler
- Joseph Cawthorn as Oscar Schlemmer
- Henry O'Neill as J.C. Anderson
- Arthur Treacher as Wilbur
- Gordon Westcott as Wellington
- Joseph Crehan as Post Office Attendant
- William Demarest as Detective
- The Maxellos as Acrobat Act
