= The Five O'Clock Girl =

Musical

- Poster by Paul Chesney for the 1929 London Hippodrome production
- Music: Harry Ruby
- Lyrics: Bert Kalmar
- Book: Guy Bolton; Fred Thompson
- Productions: 1927 Broadway; 1929 West End; 1981 Broadway revival

The Five O'Clock Girl is a musical with a book by Guy Bolton and Fred Thompson, music by Harry Ruby, and lyrics by Bert Kalmar. Set in New York City and South Hampton, Long Island, it focuses on wealthy Beekman Place playboy Gerald Brooks and impoverished shopgirl Patricia Brown, who become acquainted with each other via a series of anonymous five o'clock phone conversations.

The original Broadway production opened at the 44th Street Theatre on October 10, 1927. On April 16, 1928, it transferred to the Shubert Theatre, where it completed its total run of 280 performances on June 2. Directed by John Harwood and choreographed by Jack Haskell, it starred Oscar Shaw as Gerald Brooks, Mary Eaton as Patricia Brown, Pert Kelton as Susan Snow, and Danny Dare as Ronnie Webb. Costume design was by Charles LeMaire, and Norman Bel Geddes was the scenic designer.

A West End production opened at the London Hippodrome on March 21, 1929.

The musical was staged at the Goodspeed Opera House in East Haddam, Connecticut and the Walnut Street Theatre in Philadelphia before returning to Broadway, where it ran for six previews and 14 performances at the Helen Hayes Theatre between January 22 and February 8, 1981. Directed by Sue Lawless and choreographed by Dan Siretta, the cast included Lisby Larson, Richard Ruth, Roger Rathburn, Dee Hoty, and Pat Stanley. In his review in The New York Times, Frank Rich called it "amiably silly" and said it "is not without passing interest as an arcane footnote to theatrical history, but as entertainment in 1981 it's a pretty slim affair." He added, "The show's book is tiresomely long, and its gags are unshucked corn. Pretty soon we're living just for the songs, and very few of them prove to be worth living for."

== 1927 song list ==
Act I

- I'm One Little Party
- We Want You
- Thinking of You
- Happy Go Lucky
- Up in the Clouds
- Any Little Thing
- Following in Father's Footsteps
- Lonesome Romeos
- Tea Time Tap
- Thinking of You (Reprise)

Act II

- Who Did?
- Society Ladder
- Tell the World I'm Through
- Up in the Clouds (Reprise)
- Who Did? (Reprise)

== 1981 song list ==
Act One

- In the Old Neighborhood
- Keep Romance Alive
- Thinking of You
- I'm One Little Party
- Up in the Clouds
- My Sunny Tennessee
- Any Little Thing
- Manhattan Walk

Act II

- Long Island Low Down
- Who Did? You Did!
- Any Little Thing (Reprise)
- Nevertheless
- All Alone Monday
- Dancing the Devil Away
- Up in the Clouds (Reprise)

== Film adaptation ==
In 1928, Marion Davies and Joel McCrea starred in a screen adaptation directed by Robert Z. Leonard for Metro-Goldwyn-Mayer, but it never was released, possibly because William Randolph Hearst objected to his mistress Davies portraying a common shopgirl in her first sound film.
