= Edgar Leslie =

American songwriter (1885-1976)

- Born: December 31, 1885; Stamford, Connecticut, United States
- Died: January 22, 1976 (aged 90)
- Education: Cooper Union
- Occupation(s): Composer, lyricist
- Years active: 1909-c.late 1950s
- Awards: Songwriters Hall of Fame (1972)

Edgar Leslie (December 31, 1885 – January 22, 1976) was an American songwriter.

== Biography ==
Edgar Leslie was born in Stamford, Connecticut, in 1885. He studied at the Cooper Union in New York. He published his first song in 1909, starting a long prolific career as a composer and lyricist. He died in 1976.

== Musical career ==
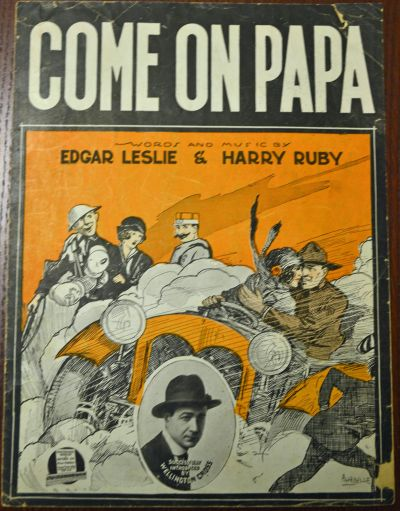
Come On Papa sheet music

Leslie's first song, "Lonesome" (1909), was an immediate success, recorded by the Haydn Quartet and again by Byron G. Harlan. Other notable artists recorded his early works. Among them were Nat M. Wills, Julian Rose, Belle Baker, Lew Dockstader, James Barton and Joe Welch.

A founding member of ASCAP in 1914. In 1927, he traveled to England and collaborated with Horatio Nicholls on several songs, most notably "Among My Souvenirs". Leslie served as its director from 1931 to 1941 and from 1947 to 1953. His most enduring success of the era was probably 1935's "Moon Over Miami". He was inducted into the Songwriters Hall of Fame in 1972.

Leslie's best-known songs include "Among My Souvenirs", "Come On Papa", "For Me And My Gal", "Getting Some Fun Out of Life", "Hello, Hawaii, How Are You?", "Girls of France", and "Moon Over Miami".

== Selected works ==
- 1913 "He'd Have to Get Under – Get Out and Get Under (to Fix Up His Automobile)" (m: Maurice Abrahams)
- 1915 "America, I Love You" (m: Archie Gottler)
- 1915 "Cheer Up, Better Times Will Soon Be Here" with Joe Young
- 1915 "Hello, Hawaii, How Are You?" with Jean Schwartz and Bert Kalmar
- 1916 "Are You Prepared for the Summer" with Bert Kalmar (m: Jean Schwartz)
- 1916 "Letter That Never Reached Home, The" (m: Archie Gottler)
- 1917 "The Dixie Volunteers" with Harry Ruby
- 1917 "Girls of America (We All Depend on You)" with Bert Kalmar (m: Harry Ruby)
- 1917 "I've Got a Red Cross Rosie Going Across with Me" with Bert Kalmar and Harry Ruby
- 1917 "Let's All Be Americans Now" with Irving Berlin & Geo. W. Meyer
- 1917 "For Me And My Gal" with George W. Meyer and E. Ray Goetz
- 1918 "American Beauty" with Albert Bryan (m: M. K. Jerome)
- 1918 "Big Chief Killahun" with Alfred Bryan (m: Maurice Abrahams)
- 1918 "Girl He Left Behind Him Has the Hardest Fight of All, The" with Al Brayan (m: Harry Ruby)
- 1918 "Girls of France" with Alfred Bryan & Harry Ruby
- 1919 "Come on Papa" with Harry Ruby
- 1919 "Come on and Play Wiz Me (My Sweet Babee)" with Bert Kalmar (m: Harry Ruby)
- 1919 "Down the Lane and Home Again" with Bert Kalmar (m: M. K. Jerome)
- 1921 "Dirty Hands, Dirty Face" with Grant Clarke, Al Jolson (m: James V. Monaco)
- 1927 "Among My Souvenirs" (m: Horatio Nicholls)
- 1934 "Were You Foolin?" (m: Fred Alhert)
- 1935 "Moon Over Miami" (m: Joe Burke)
- 1936 "Midnight Blue"
- 1936 "In a Little Gypsy Tearoom"

== See also ==
- Halsey K. Mohr, composer who often worked with Edgar Leslie
