= United States v. 50 Acres of Land =

- Supreme Court of the United States

Argued October 2, 1984 Decided December 4, 1984
- Full case name: United States v. 50 Acres of Land
- Citations: 469 U.S. 24 (more) 105 S. Ct. 451; 83 L. Ed. 2d 376

Case history
- Prior: District Court entered judgment for jury award, 529 F. Supp. 220 (N.D. Tex. 1981); reversed and remanded, 706 F.2d 1356 (5th Cir. 1983); rehearing denied, 717 F.2d 1399 (5th Cir. 1983); cert. granted, 465 U.S. 1098 (1984).

Holding
- The Fifth Amendment does not require consequential damages when the market value of the condemned property is ascertainable and when there is no showing of manifest injustice.

Court membership
- Chief Justice Warren E. Burger Associate Justices William J. Brennan Jr. · Byron White; Thurgood Marshall · Harry Blackmun; Lewis F. Powell Jr. · William Rehnquist; John P. Stevens · Sandra Day O'Connor

Case opinions
- Majority: Stevens, joined by unanimous
- Concurrence: O'Connor, joined by Powell

Laws applied
- U.S. Const. amend. V

United States v. 50 Acres of Land, 469 U.S. 24 (1985), was a United States Supreme Court case regarding whether a public condemnee is entitled to consequential damages measured by the cost of acquiring a substitute facility if it has a duty to replace the condemned facility. The Court declined to award the costs of the substitute facility, holding that the Fifth Amendment does not require consequential damages when the market value of the condemned property is ascertainable and when there is no showing of manifest injustice.

== Background ==
In 1978, as part of a flood control project, the United States condemned approximately 50 acres (200,000 m^{2}) of land owned by the city of Duncanville, Texas. The site had been used since 1969 as a sanitary landfill. In order to replace the condemned landfill, the city acquired a 113.7-acre (460,000 m^{2}) site and developed it into a larger and better facility. In the condemnation proceedings, the city claimed that it was entitled to recover all of the costs incurred in acquiring the substitute site and developing it as a landfill, an amount in excess of $1,276,000. The United States, however, contended that proper compensation should be determined by the fair market value of the condemned facility and deposited $199,950 in the registry of the court as its estimation of the amount due.

Before trial, the Government filed a motion in limine to exclude any evidence of the cost of the substitute facility, arguing that it was not relevant to the calculation of fair market value. The District Court denied the motion, noting that the Supreme Court had left open the question of the proper measure of compensation for the condemnation of public property. The court concluded that "a complete factual record should be developed from which an independent determination of the appropriate measure of compensation can be made."

== Procedural history ==
At trial, both parties submitted evidence on the fair market value of the condemned property and on the cost of the substitute landfill facility. Responding to special interrogatories, the jury found that the fair market value of the condemned property was $225,000, and that the reasonable cost of a substitute facility was $723,624.01. The District Court entered judgment for the lower amount plus interest on the difference between that amount and the sum already paid. The District Court explained that the city had not met its "burden of establishing what would be a reasonable cost of a substitute facility." In addition, the court was of the view that "substitute facilities compensation should not be awarded in every case where a public condemnee can establish a duty to replace the condemned property, at least where a fair market value can be established."

The court found no basis for departing from the market value standard in this case, and reasoned that the application of the substitute facilities measure of compensation would necessarily provide the city with a "windfall."

The Court of Appeals reversed and remanded for further proceedings. It reasoned that the city's loss attributable to the condemnation was "the amount of money reasonably spent . . . to create a functionally equivalent facility." If the city was required, either as a matter of law or as a matter of practical necessity, to replace the old landfill facility, the Court of Appeals believed that it would receive no windfall.

== Opinion of the Court ==
The Court held that the Fifth Amendment does not require that the United States pay a public condemnee compensation measured by the cost of acquiring a substitute facility that the condemnee has a duty to acquire, when the market value of the condemned property is ascertainable and when there is no showing of manifest injustice. Rather, "Just compensation" under the Fifth Amendment normally is to be measured by the market value of the property at the time of the taking, and this case is not one in which an exception is required because fair market value is not ascertainable. The testimony at trial established that there was a fairly robust market for sanitary landfill properties. The Court did also not believe that an award of compensation measured by market value here to be fundamentally inconsistent with the basic principles of indemnity embodied in the Just Compensation Clause.

In addition, the Court held that the text of the Fifth Amendment does not mandate a more favorable rule of compensation for public condemnees than for private parties. The reference to "private property" in the Takings Clause of the Fifth Amendment encompasses the property of state and local governments when it is condemned by the United States, and under this construction the same principles of just compensation presumptively apply to both private and public condemnees.

== See also ==
- Compensatory Damages
- List of United States Supreme Court cases, volume 469
