= List of United States Supreme Court cases, volume 469 =

This is a list of all United States Supreme Court cases from volume 469 of the United States Reports:

Case name	Citation	Date decided
Florida v. Rodriguez	469 U.S. 1	1984
DOJ v. Provenzano	469 U.S. 14	1984
Thompson v. Louisiana	469 U.S. 17	1984
United States v. 50 Acres of Land	469 U.S. 24	1984
Luce v. United States	469 U.S. 38	1984
United States v. Abel	469 U.S. 45	1984
United States v. Powell	469 U.S. 57	1984
Garcia v. United States	469 U.S. 70	1984
Smith v. Illinois	469 U.S. 91	1984
United States v. Woodward	469 U.S. 105	1985
Trans World Airlines, Inc. v. Thurston	469 U.S. 111	1985
Paulsen v. Commissioner	469 U.S. 131	1985
Mills Music, Inc. v. Snyder	469 U.S. 153	1985
Park 'N Fly, Inc. v. Dollar Park & Fly, Inc.	469 U.S. 189	1985
United States v. Hensley	469 U.S. 221	1985
Board of License Comm'rs v. Pastore	469 U.S. 238	1985
United States v. Boyle	469 U.S. 241	1985
Lawrence Cnty. v. Lead-Deadwood School Dist.	469 U.S. 256	1985
Ohio v. Kovacs	469 U.S. 274	1985
Alexander v. Choate	469 U.S. 287	1985
Tiffany Fine Arts, Inc. v. United States	469 U.S. 310	1985
New Jersey v. T. L. O.	469 U.S. 325	1985
Evitts v. Lucey	469 U.S. 387	1985
Wainwright v. Witt	469 U.S. 412	1985
Brandon v. Holt	469 U.S. 464	1985
United States v. Johns	469 U.S. 478	1985
NLRB v. Action Automotive, Inc.	469 U.S. 490	1985
United States v. Maine	469 U.S. 504	1985
Garcia v. San Antonio Metropolitan Transit Authority	469 U.S. 528	1985
Montanans for a Balanced Fed. Budget Comm. v. Harper	469 U.S. 1301	1984
Catholic League v. Feminist Women's Health Center, Inc.	469 U.S. 1303	1984
Northern Cal. Power Agency v. Grace Geothermal Corp.	469 U.S. 1306	1984
Thomas v. Sierra Club	469 U.S. 1309	1985
Garcia-Mir v. Smith	469 U.S. 1311	1985
