= Florida v. Rodriguez =

- Supreme Court of the United States

Decided November 13, 1984
- Full case name: Damasco Vincente Rodriguez v. Florida
- Citations: 469 U.S. 1 (more) 105 S. Ct. 308; 83 L. Ed. 2d 165; 1984 U.S. LEXIS 159; 53 U.S.L.W. 3359

Holding
- Because of the public interest in suppressing illegal drug transactions and other serious crimes, a temporary detention for questioning in the case of an airport search, even though constituting a "seizure" for Fourth Amendment purposes, may be justified without a showing of "probable cause" if there is "articulable suspicion" that a person has committed or is about to commit a crime.

Court membership
- Chief Justice Warren E. Burger Associate Justices William J. Brennan Jr. · Byron White; Thurgood Marshall · Harry Blackmun; Lewis F. Powell Jr. · William Rehnquist; John P. Stevens · Sandra Day O'Connor

Case opinions
- Per curiam
- Dissent: Marshall
- Dissent: Stevens, joined by Brennan

Laws applied
- U.S. Const. amend IV

Florida v. Rodriguez, 469 U.S. 1 (1984), was a United States Supreme Court case concerning the Fourth Amendment rights of protection from search and seizure. The case involved defendant Damasco Vincente Rodriguez against the State of Florida. After the Florida State Court and the District Court of Appeal of Florida both judged in favor of the defendant, the State of Florida appealed for a writ of Certiorari. The Supreme Court sided with the State of Florida, overturning the decision of the Florida state courts.

== Background ==
=== Facts ===
The arrest occurred on September 12, 1978 in the Miami international Airport. The two police officers involved in the arrest were Officer Charles McGee and Detective Facchiano. The two officers were working undercover, specialized in narcotics and were experienced in narcotic surveillance. The incident started when the two detectives spotted Rodriguez with two companions acting suspiciously. His two companions were later identified as Blanco and Ramirez from their plane tickets. According to the officers, they first spotted Rodriguez and his two associates at the ticket counter at the airport. After seeing the three whisper to each other, the officers decided to follow them and investigate their suspicious activity. The three cohorts noticed the officers following them on their way up an escalator and were seen exchanging nervous glances and finally saying “Let’s get out of here”. Officer McGee who became the primary witness on this case stated that he saw Rodriguez's legs start “pumping up and down very fast... as if the person were running in place”. Taking this action as an attempt to flee, the two detectives confronted the three suspects. The two undercover narcotics agents then announced to the three that they were police. Upon asking Rodriguez if he had any identification he stated that he did not, however Blanco eventually provided three airplane tickets showing their names. To further add to suspicion of the officers, when Officer McGee asked which one of them was Rodriguez both Rodriguez and Blanco stated they were him. Based on these suspicious actions, Officer McGee asked if he could search the suit bag. Rodriguez was reluctant at first stating that he did not have the key; however, his partner Ramirez told Rodriguez he should let them search the bag. Rodriguez then gave the bag to the officers who upon opening it discovered three bags of cocaine. Rodriguez, Blanco and Ramirez were then detained for possession of cocaine and intention to distribute.

=== Florida courts ===
Unlike his other two companions, Rodriguez decided to fight his case and claimed that his Fourth Amendment rights had been violated. Upon hearing Officer McGee's testimony, the Florida trial court sided with Rodriguez and suppressed the evidence found on him in May 1979. The court reasoned that the officers did not have sufficient reason to stop Rodriguez and had not informed Rodriguez that he had the right to leave and refuse the search and seizure of his luggage. The case was then brought to the Florida Court of Appeal which in November 15, 1983 affirmed the previous decision. The Florida Attorney General then petitioned a writ of certiorari and appealed the case to the Supreme Court.

== Opinion ==
On November 13, 1984, the Supreme Court of the United States decided in favor of the State of Florida in a per curiam opinion. Chief Justice Burger and Justices White, Blackmun, Powell, Rehnquist and O'Connor comprised the majority while dissenting opinions were written by Justices Marhsall and Stevens, the latter joined by Justice Brennan. The majority opinion cited United States v. Mendenhall (1980) and Florida v. Royer (1983), which stated that officers of the law can stop people in airports without probable cause and have the right to search if they received voluntary consent. The two previous trials stated that there was no probable cause, however, officers only need "articulable suspicion" in airports to stop potential suspects. The justices deemed that the two officers did indeed have sufficient suspicion to stop and question the three men. The Court also cited Schneckloth v. Bustamonte (1973), which states that a suspect does not have to be informed that they have the right to leave or deny being searched before officers of the law ask for consent to search their belongings.

=== Dissent ===
The dissenters believed that the Supreme Court should not be responsible for correcting errors of judges of state tribunals, especially ones involving drug smuggling. In addition, they believed that the original trial court ruling in 1979 was acceptable at the time since two of the cited cases used to justify the majority opinion had not yet been decided. However, they agreed with the majority that the Florida Court of Appeal should have ruled in favor of the prosecution since the verdict was reached in 1983 after all of the cited cases occurred.
