= Nevertheless I'm in Love with You =

1931 popular song

Song
- Published: 1931 by DeSylva, Brown, and Henderson
- Songwriter: Bert Kalmar
- Composer: Harry Ruby

"Nevertheless I'm in Love with You" (sometimes referred to simply as "Nevertheless") is a popular song written by Harry Ruby with lyrics by Bert Kalmar, first published in 1931. The song was a hit for Jack Denny in 1931, and was revisited in 1950 by several artists, many of whom had a chart hit with the song: The Mills Brothers, Paul Weston, Ray Anthony, Ralph Flanagan, Frankie Laine, Frank Sinatra, and the McGuire Sisters. Frankie Vaughan had a UK hit with the song in 1968.

== Notable versions ==
The Mills Brothers' rendition was released by Decca Records as catalog number 27253. It first reached the Billboard magazine charts on November 3, 1950 and lasted 15 weeks on the chart, peaking at #9.

The recording by Paul Weston was released by Columbia Records as catalog number 38982. It first reached the Billboard magazine charts on October 20, 1950 and lasted 15 weeks on the chart, peaking at #9.

The recording by Ray Anthony was released by Capitol Records as catalog number 1190. It first reached the Billboard magazine charts on October 27, 1950 and lasted 14 weeks on the chart, peaking at #15. The flip side was "Harbor Lights".

The recording by Ralph Flanagan was released by RCA Victor Records as catalog number 20-3904. It first reached the Billboard magazine charts on October 6, 1950 and lasted 10 weeks on the chart, peaking at #16. The flip side was "The Red We Want Is the Red We've Got".

'Nevertheless' was featured in the movie Three Little Words (1950), a film about the songwriters.

Frankie Vaughan recorded the song in 1968, it reached #29 in the UK and stayed on the UK singles chart for 5 weeks. It was his last UK charting single.

The song appeared as a soundtrack in a drama film Lianna (1983) and was performed by Jeanne Stahl.

== Recorded versions ==
- The Andrews Sisters
- Seger Ellis
- Ray Anthony (1950)
- Fred Astaire
- Count Basie
- Joe Williams
- Les Baxter (1954)
- Michael Bublé (featuring The Puppini Sisters) (2013).
- Bing Crosby for his album Feels Good, Feels Right (1976).
- Jimmy Dorsey and his Orchestra
- Ruth Etting
- Ralph Flanagan and his Orchestra (1950)
- Dick Haymes
- Ronnie Dove
- Frankie Laine (1950)
- Guy Lombardo
- Barry Manilow (2010)
- Dean Martin
- The McGuire Sisters
- The Mills Brothers (1950)
- Liza Minnelli
- Anne Murray
- Olivia Newton-John
- New Seekers (1973)
- Andy Gibb
- Jeanne Stahl
- Harry Nilsson for his album A Little Touch of Schmilsson in the Night (1973).
- Patti Page
- Sid Phillips and his Orchestra Refrain: Geraldine Farrar. Recorded in London on September 25, 1950. It was released by EMI on the His Master's Voice label as catalog number BD 6077.
- Johnnie Ray
- Revolver (2010)
- Alan Safier (2011)
- Frank Sinatra - Swing and Dance with Frank Sinatra (1950) and Nice 'n' Easy (1960)
- Hank Snow
- Kay Starr - I Cry By Night (1962)
- Rod Stewart (2005) from the album Thanks for the Memory: The Great American Songbook, Volume IV
- Mel Tormé
- Rudy Vallée (1931)
- Frankie Vaughan
- Paul Weston and his Orchestra (1950)
- Betty White
- Telly Savalas (1975)
- Sonny Stitt (1950)
- Bob Dylan - Fallen Angels (2016)
- Mark Lowry - Unforgettable Classics (2013)
- Dick Powell - Richard Diamond, Old Time Radio Episode, Marilyn Connors Case," January 12, 1951
