= Who's Sorry Now? (song) =

1923 song by Bert Kalmar, Harry Ruby and Ted Snyder

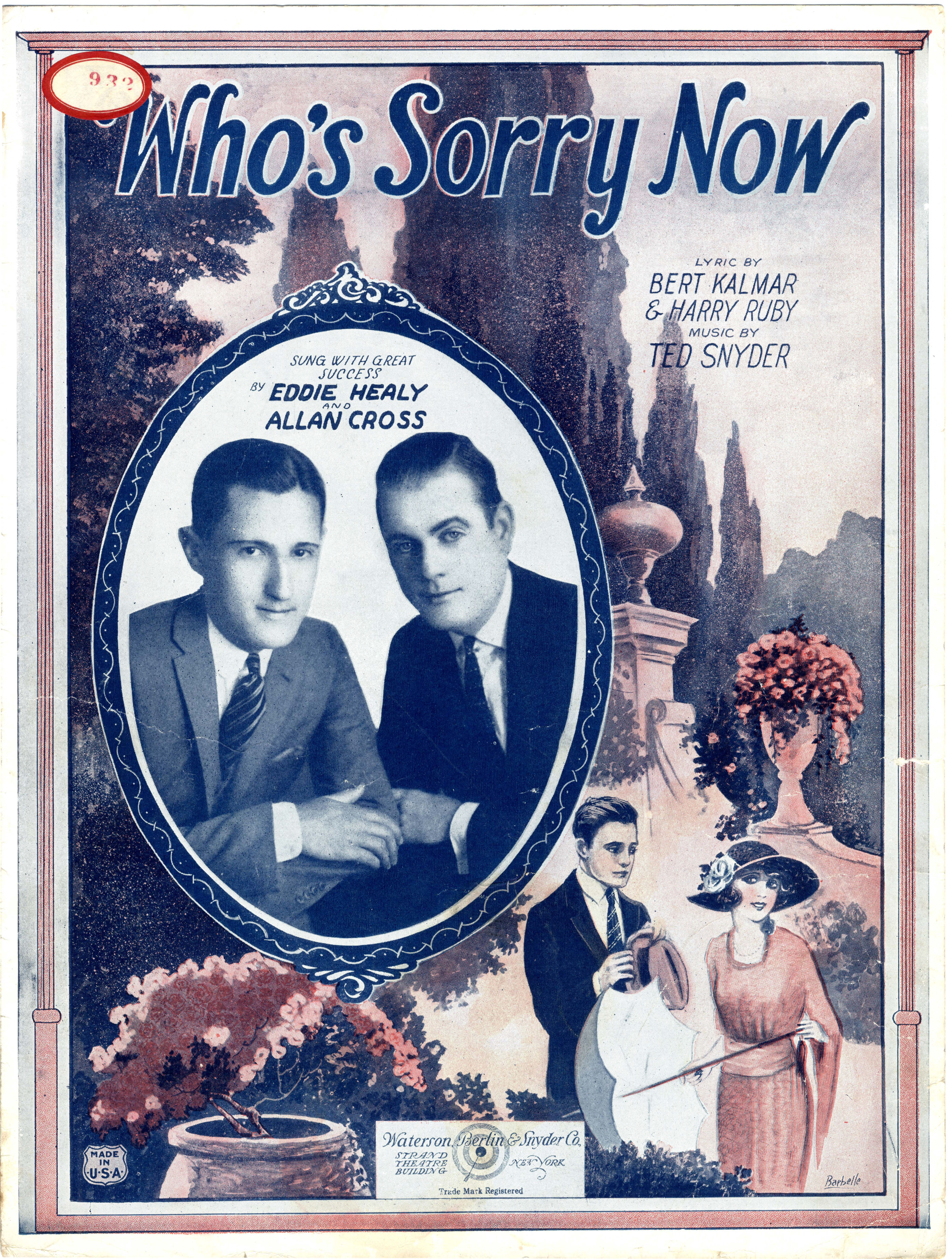
- Sheet music cover, 1923

Single by Isham Jones Orchestra
- A-side: "Swingin' Down the Lane"
- Published: March 7, 1923 Waterson, Berlin & Snyder, Inc. 1929 Mills Music, Inc.
- Released: July 1923
- Recorded: May 4, 1923
- Studio: Brunswick Studios, 799 Seventh Avenue, New York City
- Genre: American dance music, jazz
- Length: 3:04
- Label: Brunswick 2438
- Composer: Ted Snyder
- Lyricists: Bert Kalmar and Harry Ruby

Isham Jones Orchestra singles chronology
"Broken Hearted Melody" (1923)	"Who's Sorry Now?" (1923)	"When You Walked Out, Someone Else Walked Right In" (1923)

Audio sample
- Recording of Who's Sorry Now, performed by the Isham Jones Orchestra (1923): file; help

"Who's Sorry Now?" is a popular song with music written by Ted Snyder and lyrics by Bert Kalmar and Harry Ruby. It was published in 1923 as a waltz (3/4 time). Isham Jones had a hit recording in 1923 with the song arranged as a foxtrot (in 2/2 time). Later sheet music arrangements, such as the 1946 publication that was a tie-in to the Marx Brothers film of the same year A Night in Casablanca, were published in 2/2 time (notated as). Other popular versions in 1923 were by Marion Harris, Original Memphis Five, Lewis James, and Irving Kaufman.

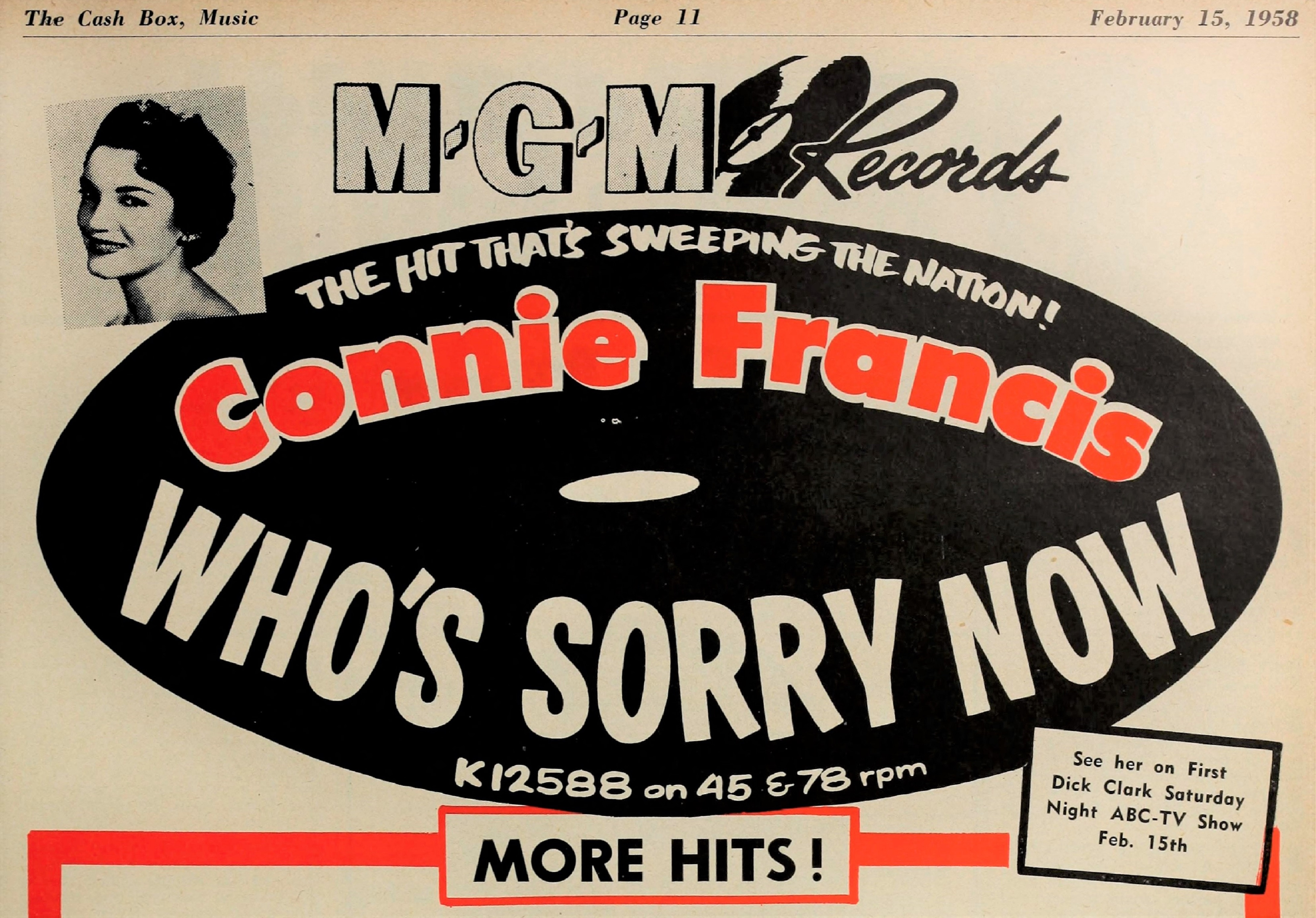
Advertisement featured in Cashbox magazine, 15 February 1958

"Who's Sorry Now?" was not only featured in A Night in Casablanca but also in the 1950 film Three Little Words, in which it was sung by Gloria DeHaven.

Karen Elson with Vince Giordano & The Nighthawks recorded the song for an episode of the HBO television series Boardwalk Empire.

The song gave American singer Connie Francis her major solo debut hit, which in March 1958 reached number 4 on Billboard's Hot 100. The single, which would become Francis's signature record, spent a total of 22 weeks on the Hot 100 – the longest of any of her hits — and was the first of her eight singles to be certified gold in America. In May and June 1958, the single spent six weeks at number one in on the UK singles chart.

The 1923 sound recordings of the song entered the public domain in the United States in 2024.

== Connie Francis version ==
"Who's Sorry Now?"

Single by Connie Francis
- B-side: "You Were Only Fooling (While I Was Falling in Love)"
- Released: November 1957
- Recorded: October 2, 1957
- Genre: Rock and roll
- Length: 2:16
- Label: MGM; K 12588
- Songwriters: Ted Snyder, Bert Kalmar, Harry Ruby
- Producer: Harry A. Myerson

Connie Francis singles chronology
"The Majesty of Love" / "You, My Darlin', You" (1957)	"Who's Sorry Now?" / "You Were Only Fooling (While I Was Falling In Love)" (1957)	"I'm Sorry I Made You Cry" / "Lock Up Your Heart" (1958)

=== Background ===
"Who's Sorry Now?" was recorded in 1957 by Connie Francis, and since then the song has become closely identified with her due to the immense popularity of her version which was her breakout hit. Since 1955, Francis had recorded 20 sides for MGM Records and only one ("The Majesty of Love", a duet with country singer Marvin Rainwater that eventually became a million-selling record) charted at all. Due to her near-complete failure as a recording artist, MGM informed her that her contract would end after one more disc. With her music career on the line, Francis's father suggested she record "Who's Sorry Now". He was convinced that it would have crossover appeal with both older listeners and teenagers if the song were given a modernized sound. Francis strongly objected to the idea on the grounds that selling the youth audience on an almost 35-year-old song was "ridiculous", but she finally agreed to it as a favor to her father. Francis's recording featured an arrangement in 12/8 time, a rhythm found in contemporaneous 1950s hits including Fats Domino's 1956 recording of the 1940 pop song "Blueberry Hill".

=== Reception ===
Backed with "You Were Only Fooling (While I Was Falling In Love)", the single was recorded on October 2, 1957. Initial attention was modest and it looked to be as much of a nonfactor as Francis's previous records, but after Dick Clark's championing of it on American Bandstand in January 1958, the single rose to number 4 on the Billboard Hot 100 that spring, with eventual US sales totaling one million units. In the UK, it was number 1 for six weeks in May and June 1958.

=== Chart performance ===
==== Weekly charts ====
Chart (1958)	Peak position
Canada CHUM Chart	1
South Africa	1
UK Singles Chart	1
US Billboard Hot 100	4
U.S. Billboard R&B Best Sellers in Stores	4
US Cash Box Top 100	3

==== Year-end charts ====
Chart (1958)	Rank
South Africa	2
UK	2
US Billboard Hot 100	39
US Cash Box	24

== Other notable versions ==
The song has been recorded by a number of artists. Among the most prominent are:

- Johnnie Ray recorded his version in 1956 for the Columbia Records label. It reached number 17 in the UK Singles Chart in February 1956.
- Lyn Paul had a 1974 single release of "Who's Sorry Now" that peaked at number 54 in the UK and at number 60 in Australia.
- Marie Osmond's third studio album, released in 1975, featured a remake of "Who's Sorry Now" as its title cut; this version reached number 40 on the Billboard Hot 100, also ranking on Billboard's C&W chart and Easy Listening chart at respectively number 29 and 21.
- Gracie Lawrence sang a version of this song in 2025 in Just in Time.

== See also ==
- List of UK Singles Chart number ones of the 1950s
- Mills Music, Inc. v. Snyder
