= I Wanna Be Loved by You =

Song by Helen Kane
- Released: December 1928
- Recorded: September 5, 1928
- Genre: Pop; Love song
- Length: 2:48
- Label: Victor
- Songwriters: Herbert Stothart, Harry Ruby, Bert Kalmar

"I Wanna Be Loved by You" is a song written by Herbert Stothart and Harry Ruby, with lyrics by Bert Kalmar, for the 1928 musical Good Boy. It was first performed on September 5, 1928, by Helen Kane, who was the inspiration for the cartoon character Betty Boop. "I Wanna Be Loved by You" was chosen as one of the Songs of the Century in a survey by the RIAA to which 200 people responded (out of 1300 asked). One of Marilyn Monroe's most famous musical performances is her singing the song in Billy Wilder's classic 1959 farce Some Like It Hot.

The original lyrics and music of the song entered the public domain in the United States in 2024.

== Background ==
The song was first performed in 1928 by Helen Kane, who became known as the 'Boop-Boop-a-Doop Girl' because of her baby-talk, scat-singing tag line to the song. This version was recorded when Kane's popularity started to reach its peak, and became her signature song. Two years later, a cartoon character named Betty Boop was modeled after Kane. Desirée Goyette performs the number as Betty Boop in the 1980s animated film The Romance of Betty Boop.

In 1950, the song was a highlight of the Kalmer-Ruby biopic Three Little Words, performed by Debbie Reynolds and Carleton Carpenter as Helen Kane and vaudeville performer Dan Healy. Helen Kane dubbed the vocal for Reynolds’ voice.

== In popular culture ==
In Gentlemen Marry Brunettes (1955), this song is performed by Jane Russell, Jeanne Crain (dubbed by Anita Ellis) and Rudy Vallee.

In Some Like it Hot (1959), this song is performed by Marilyn Monroe.

In a The Wednesday Play episode ("Up the Junction", November 3, 1965, directed by Ken Loach), Carol White as Sylvie sings the song in a pub.

In the Gilligan's Island episode "The Second Ginger Grant" (March 6, 1967), Ginger Grant sings the song on at least one occasion for the entertainment of the fellow castaways. Her performance so impresses Mary Ann Summers that, after Mary Ann hits her head, she takes on Ginger's personality and identity. However, when Mary Ann tries to sing the song, her lack of talent and natural stage presence make her uncomfortable and she faints, snapping out of her amnesia.

In an episode of The Brady Bunch ("Never Too Old", October 5, 1973), Bobby (Mike Lookinland) must quarantine from the family after his first kiss from Millicent (Melissa Sue Anderson) could potentially produce the mumps. Meanwhile, Mike (Robert Reed), in his den with Carol (Florence Henderson), pulls out his ukulele as Carol leads them in a duet of their own rendition. Alice (Ann B. Davis) pokes her head in, duster brandishing on cue with her closing "Boop-Boop-Be-Doop."

In an episode of The Golden Girls ("Journey to the Center of Attention", February 22, 1992), Blanche Devereaux butchers the song at the Rusty Anchor.

In an episode of Family Matters ("Le Jour d'Amour", February 14, 1997, St. Valentine's Day), Myra Monkhouse sings the song to her boyfriend, Steve Urkel.

In Rob Zombie’s 2003 film House of 1000 Corpses, Baby Firefly performs the song for the family's unwitting victims.

The song is performed in the 2007 television version of Kingdom of Crooked Mirrors.

In the 2013 Australian musical adaptation of King Kong, the number is performed as Ann Darrow is robbed by thugs who taunt her.

The song is on the trailer of the 2022 Ti West movie Pearl.

The song has also been recorded by performers Vaughn De Leath, Annette Hanshaw, Jack Lemmon, Frank Sinatra, Miss Miller and The Chipettes, Rose Murphy, Verka Serduchka, Patricia Kaas, Sinéad O'Connor, Jinx Titanic, Shiina Ringo, Claire Johnston, Eve's Plum and Barry Manilow (in a duet with the Marilyn Monroe recording) among others.
