= Three Little Words (film) =

1950 film by Richard Thorpe

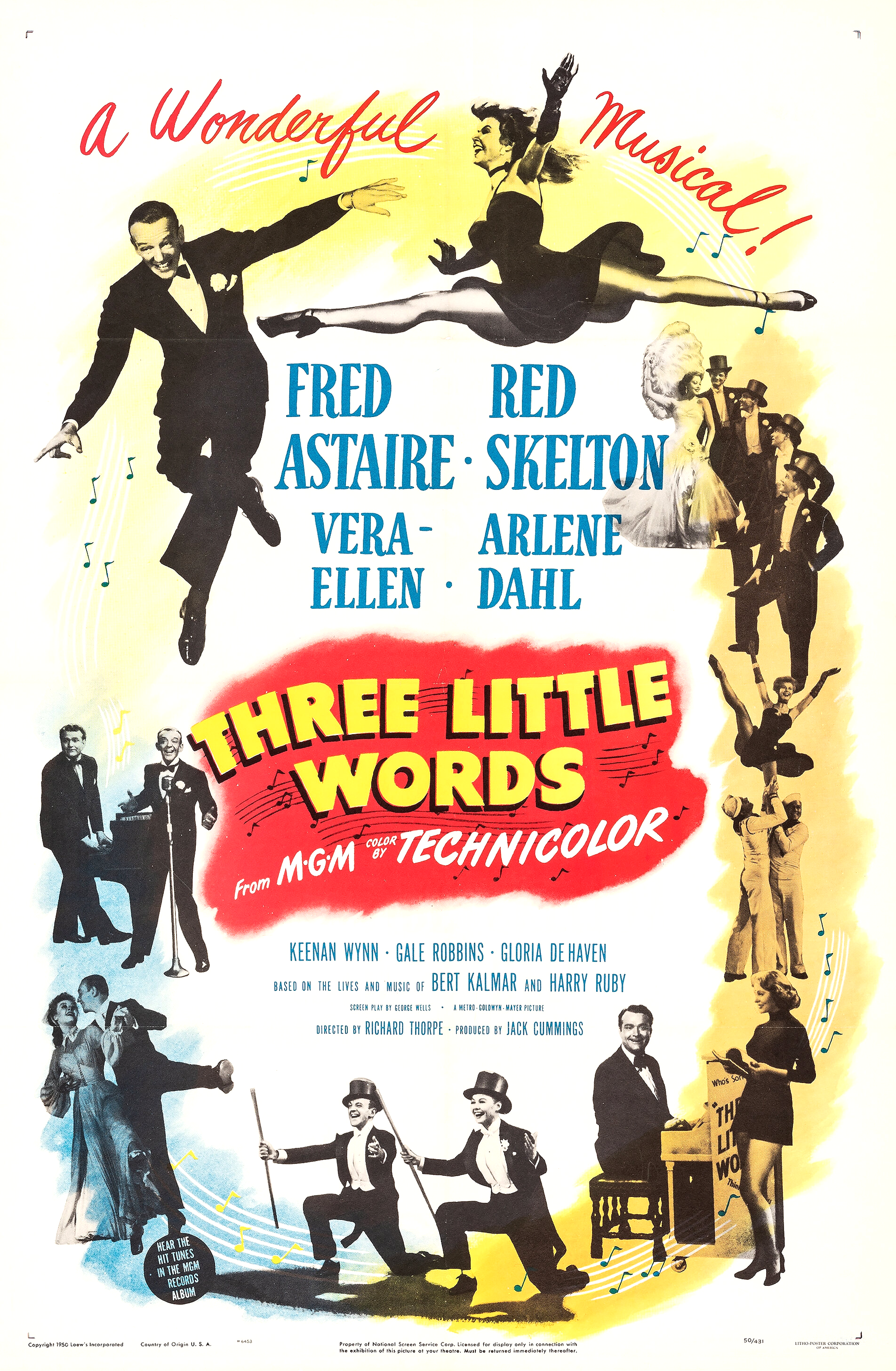
- Theatrical release poster
- Directed by: Richard Thorpe
- Screenplay by: George Wells
- Produced by: Jack Cummings
- Starring: Fred Astaire; Red Skelton; Vera-Ellen; Arlene Dahl
- Cinematography: Harry Jackson
- Edited by: Ben Lewis
- Music by: André Previn
- Production company: Metro-Goldwyn-Mayer
- Distributed by: Loew's Inc.
- Release date: July 12, 1950
- Running time: 102 minutes
- Country: United States
- Language: English
- Budget: $1,470,000
- Box office: $4,526,000

Three Little Words is a 1950 American biographical musical comedy film directed by Richard Thorpe from a screenplay by George Wells. It stars Fred Astaire as lyricist Bert Kalmar and Red Skelton as composer Harry Ruby, Vera-Ellen and Arlene Dahl, with Debbie Reynolds in a small role as singer Helen Kane and Gloria DeHaven as her own mother, Mrs. Carter DeHaven.

The film was produced by Jack Cummings and released by Metro-Goldwyn-Mayer. Ruby served as a consultant on the project and appears in a cameo role as a baseball catcher. The third in a series of MGM biopics about Broadway composers, it was preceded by Till the Clouds Roll By (1946) and Words and Music (1948) and followed by Deep in My Heart (1954).

== Plot ==
In New York City, in the mid-1910s, Bert Kalmar co-stars in a successful vaudeville dance act with his partner and sweetheart, Jessie Brown. In between shows, Bert engages in songwriting and playwriting, and secretly indulges in his hobby as a magician. When he proposes to Jessie, she initially refuses since he is preoccupied with his show business aspirations, but promises to inform him if she changes her mind. Bert moonlights as a magician at a small Coney Island theater where Harry Ruby, a song plugger, plays the piano. One day, Harry is enlisted by his boss to serve as Bert's assistant, but he accidentally ruins the magic show, drawing laughter from the audience and angering Bert.

Bert and Jessie continue performing their vaudeville act until he injures his knee in a backstage accident, rendering him unable to dance for at least a year. Jessie accepts Bert's marriage proposal, hoping he will finally have more time for her, but he worries he will not be able to support her and believes she should find another dancing partner. Heartbroken, Jessie storms off and goes on a solo tour. Some time later at his music publisher's office, Bert becomes interested in a tune that Harry is playing on a piano. After the two spend the day working on the tune together, Bert recognizes Harry as the clumsy assistant who ruined his magic show and angrily leaves.

After Bert and Harry's first song together, "My Sunny Tennessee", becomes a hit, Bert agrees to the partnership, and the duo writes a string of hit songs. Seeing how much Bert misses Jessie, Harry proposes a trip to Buffalo, where Jessie is performing her show. Bert and Jessie reconcile and, back in New York, finally get married. Meanwhile, Harry is engaged to Terry Lordel, a seductive nightclub singer who is using him to further her own career. Realizing that Harry is oblivious to Terry's deception, Bert arranges for his friend to play baseball with his favorite team, the Washington Senators, in Florida to protect him from an inevitable heartbreak.

When Harry returns to New York, Bert informs him that Terry has married another man. Bert has finished his play and found a Wall Street broker to invest in it. After reading the play, Harry is certain that it will flop and, to protect Bert, secretly persuades the broker not to finance the play. Some time later, Harry begins a romance with actress Eileen Percy, whom he had previously met when she served as an understudy to Terry. At a party, Bert discovers that it was Harry who sabotaged his play and ends their partnership. Bert moves to Hollywood and finds success as a screenwriter, while Harry continues to compose songs.

Eileen, now married to Harry, secretly enlists Jessie's help to arrange a reunion of Bert and Harry. Together, the two women convince Bert and Harry to perform a medley of their songs on Phil Regan's radio show. At the end, Bert surprises Harry by singing Harry's latest composition, "Three Little Words", to which Bert had secretly written lyrics.

== Cast ==
- Fred Astaire as Bert Kalmar
- Red Skelton as Harry Ruby
- Vera-Ellen as Jessie Brown Kalmar
  - Anita Ellis as Jessie Brown Kalmar (singing voice, uncredited)
- Arlene Dahl as Eileen Percy
- Keenan Wynn as Charlie Kope
- Gale Robbins as Terry Lordel
- Gloria DeHaven as Mrs. Carter DeHaven
- Phil Regan as himself
- Harry Shannon as Clanahan
- Debbie Reynolds as Helen Kane
  - Helen Kane as herself (singing voice, uncredited)
- Paul Harvey as Al Masters
- Carleton Carpenter as Dan Healy
- George Metkovich as Al Schacht
- The Great Mendoza as himself

== Production ==
The film was one of Astaire's favorites. Three Little Words takes fewer liberties with the facts than many Hollywood biopics, and Astaire and Skelton's portrayal of the songwriting partnership is considered psychologically accurate. Adding to the film's appeal is the quality acting and mutual chemistry between Skelton and Astaire, as well as some fine comedy touches from Skelton.

Unusually for songwriting biographies of this period, "Thinking of You" and "Nevertheless (I'm in Love with You)" became major hits on the U.S. music charts when the film was released, reaching numbers one and two, respectively.

== Key songs/dance routines ==
This film provides an object lesson in how to integrate numerous songs and dances seamlessly and naturally into the script, a principle Astaire introduced as far back as 1934. Astaire's choreography takes the opportunity provided by Vera-Ellen's technical prowess to showcase dance routines notable for leg kicks, lifts and (Astaire's innovative combination of the two) the hurdling lift, invented for "The Yam" number in Carefree (1938). These routines are contrasted with some choreographically primitive numbers typical of vaudeville c. 1920. The spirit of the partnered dances expands on the theme of marital contentment previously explored in The Story of Vernon and Irene Castle (1939) and the prior year's The Barkleys of Broadway (1949). Vera-Ellen's singing voice was dubbed by Anita Ellis.

- "Where Did You Get That Girl?": Decked out in top hat, white tie and tails, Astaire and Vera-Ellen impersonate the vaudeville duo of Kalmar and Brown with this genial song and dance duet set around 1919. (The 1913 song was written by Kalmar and an earlier partner, Harry Puck.) Fred and Adele Astaire greatly admired the Kalmar-Brown partnership: "We used to stand in the wings and watch Jessie and Bert with thrilled envy, wondering if we could equal their finesse and reach their headline billing." The routine is straightforward, and when contrasted with the creations of Astaire, Gene Kelly and others, illustrates the profound evolution of popular dance in the intervening period. Incidentally, Ruby, working as a song plugger, once played for the Astaire siblings.
- "Mr. and Mrs. Hoofer at Home": A hectic and high-kicking comic dance duet for Astaire and Vera-Ellen set in a suburban living room which portrays the various challenges of contented domesticity. The routine, which in contrast to the previous one is thoroughly modern in conception, is nonetheless shown performed at the Keith's Theatre (which later became the K in RKO)
  in Washington, D.C. in the presence of noted vaudeville fan President Woodrow Wilson.
- "My Sunny Tennessee": Astaire and Skelton deliver a version of this 1921 hit.
- "So Long, Oo-Long": Astaire and Skelton perform Kalmar and Ruby's 1920 Oriental-themed ditty.
- "Who's Sorry Now?": This 1923 Kalmar and Ruby standard was sung by Gloria DeHaven.
- "Test Solo": Danced by Astaire, initially to a spare piano accompaniment by André Previn and then to the music of "Where Did You Get That Girl?". This was his fifth tap and cane solo, the first being "Top Hat, White Tie and Tails" from Top Hat (1935), followed by "I Can't Be Bothered Now" from A Damsel in Distress (1937), the "Audition Dance" from You Were Never Lovelier (1942), and "Puttin' On the Ritz" from Blue Skies (1946) - all remarkably dissimilar in execution. At the beginning, Astaire places his hat atop a light stand and then waves to it. One year later, in "Sunday Jumps" from Royal Wedding (1951), he would famously execute a routine with a hat rack as his partner.
- "Come On Papa": Vera-Ellen and a chorus of sailors perform another high-kicking song and dance routine to a 1918 song by Ruby and Edgar Leslie.
- "Nevertheless (I'm in Love with You)": Accompanied by Skelton on piano, Astaire and Vera-Ellen perform Kalmar and Ruby's 1931 song.
- "All Alone Monday": Gale Robbins delivers Kalmar and Ruby's 1926 ballad.
- "I Wanna Be Loved by You": Debbie Reynolds, in one of her earliest film appearances, performs this 1928 number with Carleton Carpenter. Reynolds is dubbed by the original "boop-boop-a-doop" girl, Helen Kane (uncredited).
- "Thinking of You": One of the dance highlights of the film is this romantic partnered routine for Astaire and Vera-Ellen, which follows Ellen's (dubbed) performance of this 1927 standard. The dance begins quietly and affectionately in a lounge area, and gradually builds, becoming progressively more extrovert until the music changes into a rumba - the Latin dance of love - and Astaire embarks on a further exploration of the possibilities of blending Latin and ballroom dance styles, which he had first been inspired to undertake during his celebrated partnership with Rita Hayworth. After this departure, illustrating the passion that can flourish long after the honeymoon, the dance subsides into a tender coda, recalling its opening mood.
- "I Love You So Much": Arlene Dahl, accompanied by a chorus of top-hatted men, sings and dances her way through this number originally written for the 1930 film version of The Ramblers (later retitled The Cuckoos).
- "Medley" (incl. "Three Little Words"): In this closing "and then we wrote" scene, Astaire and Skelton perform a medley of most songs featured in the movie, ending with "Three Little Words" - Kalmar having finally found a suitable lyric for Ruby's melody, a running gag throughout the film.

== Reception ==
=== Box office ===
According to MGM records, Three Little Words earned $3,019,000 in the United States and Canada and $1,507,000 elsewhere, resulting in a profit of $1,252,000.

=== Critical response ===
- The New York Times, August 10, 1950: "There is a special quality about the new picture...which deserves immediate mention in detail. That is the polished performance of Fred Astaire as Bert Kalmar... Mr. Astaire has been wearing out thin-soled dancing shoes at a great pace over the years while most of us have grown a little heavier and somewhat slower of foot. But, he hasn't changed. Still lithe in appearance, Mr. Astaire has drawn rich dividends from time and is dancing in peak form...In talking of the fine dancing contributed by Mr. Astaire we forgot to mention how engagingly they carry off the romantic interest and bust into song when the script demands it."
- Variety, July 12, 1950: Stal.: "For Astaire, it's unquestionably his best picture in some time. His terping, as always, is tops, his singing is adequate and his characterisation of Kalmar, while never deeply-etched, does full justice to the late songwriter's many talents...Vera-Ellen, with this picture, becomes the undisputed premiere danseuse of the screen. She matches Astaire tap for tap...and looks to be the best partner he's ever had."

=== Accolades ===
At the 8th Golden Globe Awards, Fred Astaire was the first recipient of the Best Actor in a Motion Picture – Musical or Comedy award, while Debbie Reynolds was nominated for New Star of the Year.
