= The Rasslin' Match =

1934 film by Vernon Stallings

The Rasslin’ Match
- Directed by: Vernon Stallings
- Based on: Amos And Andy
- Produced by: Amandee J. Van Buren
- Starring: Charles J. Correll and Freeman F. Gosden
- Music by: Winston Sharples
- Production company: The Van Beuren Corporation
- Distributed by: RKO Radio Pictures
- Release date: 1934
- Country: United States
- Language: English

The Cartoon

The Rasslin' Match is a 1934 animated short film based on the popular Amos 'n' Andy radio series. It was produced by the Van Beuren Studios and directed by Vernon Stallings and starring Charles J. Correll and Freeman F. Gosden as the voices of their popular radio characters, Amos and Andy.

== Story ==
Amos walks into the Fresh Air taxi cab company where Andy is asleep. Woken up, Andy pretends to be working. In walks Kingfish who has a big deal: for Andy to wrestle Bullneck Mooseface for the Championship of the World. Andy immediately agrees, despite Amos trying to dissuade him. In the gym, Kingfish introduces Andy to his trainer, Brother Hercules, a small man who seems to be as strong as his namesake as he effortlessly tosses Andy around.

Hercules tells Andy that Bullneck's weak spot is on the top of his head as he beats Andy up in the ring. Andy is put on shadow boxing, and predictably gets the worst of it. Then road work, following a car, bumping into it twice and falling into a mud puddle. They reach Bullneck's training camp and see the big man effortlessly beating up his opponents. Andy finally realizes what he has let himself into as he sweats, swallows, and turns white with fear before fainting.

On the day of the big fight, Kingfish appeals to Andy's greed by telling him that when he wins he is going to get a solid gold belt full of diamonds. Amos turns up with a wreath, which Kingfish has said should be hung around Andy's neck when he wins the match. The crowd (all black people) cheers as the Champion arrives. He takes off his robe to reveal his muscular frame. Andy takes off his robe to reveal a mass of blubber. He keeps on his bowler and smokes his cigar throughout the fight. The crowd boos him.

The opponents feel each other out. Andy decides to get out of the ring but Amos knocks him back in again with a broom. Andy does his best to stay out of the angry Mooseface's way as the Champion's homely face morphs into a real moose's face. Mooseface falls over and at Amos's shout, Andy jumps on him. The crowd cheers as they roll around the ring.

They separate and Andy tries to avoid Mooseface who on his third attempt grabs Andy and starts bouncing him off of the ropes around the ring, like Andy is a ball. For a change, instead of using his hand to knock Andy to the ropes, Mooseface headbutts him there instead. Amos sees the solution and shouts for Andy to take off his hat. Andy does and their heads collide as the ropes toss Andy back to Mooseface, knocking Mooseface flat on his back. He is knocked out and Andy, also knocked out, falls across him and is declared the winner by the referee. The wreath, which now bears the word "SUCCESS", is put around the unconscious Andy's neck as the crowd cheers.

== Reception ==
The Film Daily (Jan 9, 1934): "This cartoon brings a new technique to the screen insofar as the actual voices of Amos and Andy have been synchronized with the drawn characters. It has been fairly well accomplished and should prove a good laugh number, especially for the followers of the two radio comedians."

Selected Motion Pictures (Feb 1, 1934): "An Amos 'n' Andy cartoon-voice combination in which the voices of the comedians are synchronized with a cartoon of one of their radio episodes. Amusing and the new technique is interesting."
