= Fred Van Eps =

American banjoist and banjo maker (1878–1960)

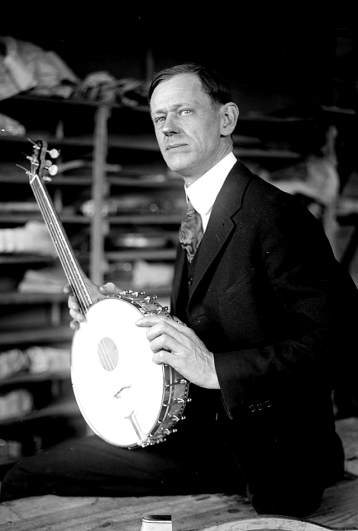

Background information
- Born: December 30, 1878; Somerville, New Jersey, U.S.
- Origin: West Orange, New Jersey
- Died: November 22, 1960 (aged 81) Burbank, California
- Genres: Ragtime, jazz
- Occupation: Musician
- Instrument: Banjo
- Years active: 1897–1950s
- Labels: Edison, Columbia, Victor

Fred Van Eps (December 30, 1878 – November 22, 1960) was an American banjoist and banjo maker. The "Van Eps Recording Banjo" was a well-known model until 1930. He was the father of jazz guitarist George Van Eps.

== Biography ==
Van Eps was born in Somerville, New Jersey, United States, and moved with his family to Plainfield in 1892. He learned to play the banjo and studied the phonograph cylinder recordings of Vess Ossman. In 1897 Van Eps was hired by Thomas Edison's National Phonograph Company in West Orange to work in studio engagements. Van Eps's cylinder recordings, often remakes of Ossman's tunes, sold well for Edison. Early ragtime banjo recordings by Van Eps included "A Bunch of Rags" (1900) and "A Ragtime Episode" (1902). He also recorded for a number of other companies, including Columbia (from 1904) and Victor (from 1910).

The Van Eps Trio recorded steadily from 1912 to 1922. He also led other groups, such as the Van Eps Quartet, the Van Eps Specialty Four, and the Van Eps Banjo Orchestra. In 1914, the latter group was one of the first to record for the American branch of the French Pathé Frères Company. In 1921, Orlando Kellum, inventor of the Photokinema sound-on-disc sound film system, filmed the Van Eps Trio in The Famous Van Eps Trio in a Bit of Jazz.

With Henry Burr, he formed a company that manufactured and sold the Van Eps Recording Banjo, modeled on the one he used in recordings and concerts. The banjo remained on the market until about 1930, when widespread use of electric recording removed the need for the loud volume produced by the Van Eps model.

Fred had four musical sons: Fred Jr. (trumpet); George (guitar); Johnny (saxophone); and Bobby (piano). All became prominent in the 1920s and '30s.

By the 1930s the banjo had fallen out of favor in popular music, and George Van Eps gained fame as a studio guitarist, playing with Benny Goodman, Ray Noble, and Red Norvo. Meanwhile, Fred Sr. was associated with the British banjo composer Frank Lawes and recorded some pieces with him. In the 1950s he attempted a comeback with a number of banjo recordings before his death in Burbank, California, at the age of 81.

Van Eps also worked in vaudeville and influenced pre-bluegrass musicians like Charlie Poole and the North Carolina Ramblers.

In 2025, Van Eps was inducted into the American Banjo Museum Hall of Fame under the Historical category.
