= Harry Ruby =

American songwriter (1895–1974)

- Born: Harry Rubenstein; January 27, 1895; New York City, U.S.
- Died: February 23, 1974 (aged 79); Woodland Hills, California, U.S.
- Occupations: Pianist; composer; songwriter; screenwriter
- Spouses: Chloe Carter (div. 1934); Eileen Percy (m. 1936; died 1973)

Harry Rubenstein (January 27, 1895 – February 23, 1974), known professionally as Harry Ruby, was an American pianist, composer, songwriter and screenwriter, who was inducted into the Songwriters Hall of Fame in 1970. He was married to silent film actress Eileen Percy.

== Biography ==
Ruby was born in New York City in 1895. After failing at his early ambition to become a professional baseball player, he toured the vaudeville circuit as a pianist with the Bootblack Trio and the Messenger Boys Trio.

In his early career he worked as a pianist and song plugger for the Gus Edwards and Harry Von Tilzer publishing firms (one of his co-workers at Edwards' place was the young Walter Winchell, who was also a song plugger). Ruby also played in vaudeville acts, nickelodeons and cafes throughout New York.

From 1917-1920, Ruby collaborated with songwriters Edgar Leslie, Sam Lewis, Joe Young and George Jessel on the hit songs “What’ll We Do Saturday Night When the Town Goes Dry”, “When Those Sweet Hawaiian Babies Roll Their Eyes”, “Come on Papa”, “Daddy Long Legs” and “And He’d Say Oo-La-La Wee Wee.”

Ruby found his most sustained success as a composer after meeting the man who would become his longtime partner, lyricist Bert Kalmar. Kalmar and Ruby were a successful songwriting team for nearly three decades until Kalmar's death in 1947, a partnership portrayed in the 1950 MGM musical Three Little Words, starring Fred Astaire as Kalmar and Red Skelton as Ruby.

Ruby was a close friend of the Marx Brothers, especially Groucho and he made several appearances on Groucho's television program, You Bet Your Life. In his 1972 concert at Carnegie Hall, Marx gave the following introduction before performing one of a few songs by Ruby: "I have a friend in Hollywood ... I think I do, I'm not so sure. [laughter] His name is Harry Ruby [applause] and he wrote a lot of songs that I've sung over the years ..."

Today, Father, is Father's Day
And we're giving you a tie
It's not much we know
It is just our way of showing you
We think you're a regular guy
You say that it was nice of us to bother
But it really was a pleasure to fuss
For according to our mother
You're our father
And that's good enough for us
Yes, that's good enough for us

In The Dick Cavett Show, recorded June 13, 1969, Marx also sang a second stanza, and introduced it with, "Isn't that a beautiful melody? And a beautiful sentiment: ... Today, father, is father's day. ... 16 men in that orchestra: nine of them are illegitimate children [laughter]. Nine and a half including the director."

The tie that you got
Didn't cost such a lot
And we'll give you the same tie next year.
You tell us it was nice of us to bother
But it really was a pleasure to fuss
For they say, a child can only have one father
And you are the one for us.
And you are the one for us.

== Works ==
=== Selected film scores ===
- Animal Crackers (1930)
- Horse Feathers (1932)
- Duck Soup (1933)
- Bright Lights (1935)
- Walking on Air (1936)
- Wake Up and Dream (1946)
- Three Little Words (1950)

=== Selected screenplays ===
- The Kid from Spain (1932)
- Horse Feathers (1932)
- Duck Soup (1933)
- Bright Lights (1935)
- Walking on Air (1936)
- The Life of the Party (1937)
- Lovely to Look At (1952)

=== Selected Broadway scores ===
- Ziegfeld Follies of 1918 (1918) - revue - featured songwriter
- Helen of Troy, New York (1923) - musical - co-composer and co-lyricist
- No Other Girl (1924) - musical - co-composer and co-lyricist
- Holka Polka (1925) - musical - co-book-editor
- The Ramblers (1926) - musical - co-composer, co-lyricist and co-bookwriter
- Lucky (1927) - musical - co-bookwriter
- The Five O'Clock Girl (1927) - musical - composer
- She's My Baby (1928) - musical - co-bookwriter
- Good Boy (1928) - musical - co-composer and co-lyricist
- Animal Crackers (1928) - musical - co-composer and co-lyricist
- Top Speed (1929) - musical - co-producer and co-bookwriter
- High Kickers (1941) - musical - co-composer, co-lyricist and co-bookwriter
- Fosse (1998) - revue - featured songwriter for "Who's Sorry Now?" from All That Jazz 1979

=== Notable songs ===
So Long Oo-Long (How Long You Gonna Be Gone?) - played by the Van Eps Quartet. Original music by Harry Brooks and Bert Kalmar. Arranged for banjo by Ruby Brooks.

- "Rebecca Came Back From Mecca" (1921)
- "The Sheik of Avenue B" (1922)
- "Who's Sorry Now?" (1923), Kalmar and Ruby's first big hit
- "I Wanna Be Loved by You" (1928), a hit for Helen Kane, known as the "Boop-boop-a-doop girl", and sung by Marilyn Monroe in the film Some Like It Hot
- "Hooray for Captain Spaulding" from Animal Crackers (1928): became Groucho Marx's signature tune.
- "I Love You So Much" (1928)
- "Three Little Words" (1930), Kalmar and Ruby's biggest hit.
- "Nevertheless" (1931), a hit for Jack Denny (vocal by Bob May) that year, later done by The Mills Brothers and Frank Sinatra
- "I'm Against It", "I Always Get My Man" and "Everyone Says I Love You" from Horse Feathers (1932)
- "Hail, Hail Freedonia" from Duck Soup (1933)
- "What a Perfect Combination" (1932), lyrics by Kalmar and Irving Caesar, music by Ruby and Harry Akst, written for the Broadway show The Kid, starring Eddie Cantor
- "A Kiss to Build a Dream On" (1935), Kalmar and Ruby's last hit
- "Omaha, Nebraska" (1951), lyrics and vocal by Groucho Marx
- "Show Me a Rose" (1952), Groucho Marx recording
- "The Real McCoys" (1957-1963), television theme

=== Selected bibliography ===
- The Kalmar-Ruby Song Book Random House (1936) B009X7KK6K Introduction by Ben Hecht with contributions by Groucho Marx,
  Robert Benchley, Moss Hart, Irving Berlin, Marc Connelly, James Kevin McGuinness, Franklin P. Adams and Nunnally Johnson.
- Songs My Mother Never Sang Random House (1943) B002B9VFCA
- The Four Marx Brothers in Monkey Business and Duck Soup Simon & Schuster (1973) 978-0671212735 S.J. Perelman; Will B. Johnstone; Bert Kalmar; and Harry Ruby

== Death ==
Ruby died on February 23, 1974, in Woodland Hills, California, and was interred at the Chapel of the Pines in Los Angeles.

== See also ==
- Category:Songs with music by Harry Ruby
