= Bert Kalmar =

American songwriter (1884–1947)

- L to R: Harry Ruby and Bert Kalmar
- Born: February 10, 1884; New York City, U.S.
- Died: September 18, 1947 (aged 63); Los Angeles, California, U.S.
- Occupations: Songwriter; screenwriter
- Spouse: Jessie Brown
- Children: 2

Bert Kalmar (February 10, 1884 – September 18, 1947) was an American songwriter. He was inducted into the Songwriters Hall of Fame in 1970. He was also a screenwriter.

== Biography ==
Kalmar was born on February 10, 1884 in New York City to Kopel (Charles) Kalvarinsky and Julia Kalvarinsky. He left school at an early age and began working in vaudeville. He appeared as a magician in tent shows, and as a comedian and dancer on stage in vaudeville before switching to songwriting, after a knee injury ended his performing career. By this time, he had earned enough to start a music publishing company, Kalmar and Puck, where he collaborated with a number of songwriters, including Harry Puck and Harry Ruby. The publishing firm also operated under the name Kalmar, Puck, Abrahams, Consolidated, Inc., the other named partner being Maurice Abrahams (1883–1931), husband of Belle Baker.

== Success at songwriting ==
By 1918, Kalmar and Ruby had formed a permanent songwriting team. Their first success was a tune co-written with Irving Berlin and sung by Fanny Brice in the Ziegfeld Follies of 1920. Together, they wrote the musical score for the Marx Brothers' stage production of Animal Crackers (1928) and subsequent film version. Their songs were also featured in five Marx Brothers' films including Horse Feathers (1932), Duck Soup (1933) and A Night in Casablanca (1946). After they moved to Hollywood in 1930, Kalmar also worked as a screenwriter for Look for the Silver Lining and Bright Lights as well as Duck Soup.

Their collaboration would produce some enduring hits including “Three Little Words”, “So Long, OO-Long”, “She’s Mine, All Mine”, “Who’s Sorry Now?”, “Thinking of You”, “Up in the Clouds”, “I Wanna Be Loved by You”, “Watching Clouds Roll By”, “My Sunny Tennessee” (the team's first hit), “I Love You So Much”, “Everyone Says I Love You”, “The Egg and Eye” and “A Kiss to Build a Dream On”.

In 1923 they scored their first Broadway show, Helen of Troy and enjoyed a hit with “Who’s Sorry Now?”, written with Ted Snyder. The 1927 song “Thinking of You” in the show The 5 O’Clock Girl was considered a standout. After singer Sarah Vaughan recorded it in 1950, it became one of her most requested songs.

According to the New York Times obituary of Ruby on February 25, 1974, Kalmar and Ruby enjoyed a career as an outstanding song team for more than 30 years, having entertained Broadway with long runs of musical comedies and revues.

In 1928 Helen Kane, the “Boop-Boop-a-Doop” girl, popularized “I Wanna Be Loved by You”, later sung by Marilyn Monroe in the 1959 film Some Like It Hot.

"Hooray for Captain Spaulding”, Groucho’s character's theme song in 1928’s Animal Crackers, became so well known as Groucho's signature song that it was used as the theme for his TV show, “You Bet Your Life.”

Kalmar's partnership with Ruby was portrayed in the 1950 Metro-Goldwyn-Mayer musical Three Little Words, starring Fred Astaire and Red Skelton. The title of the film was based on the song they wrote for the 1930 Amos and Andy film Check and Double Check performed by Bing Crosby with the Duke Ellington Orchestra. Besides partnering with Ruby, Kalmar occasionally worked with Oscar Hammerstein II, Ted Snyder and other songwriters.

Kalmar and Ruby also collaborated on several other screenplays including The Kid from Spain (1932), starring Eddie Cantor; Bright Lights (1935), starring Joe E. Brown; and Look for the Silver Lining (1949), a biopic of Marilyn Miller. In testimony to the enduring nature of their work, “A Kiss to Build a Dream On,” written in 1935 with lyricist Oscar Hammerstein II, was featured in the 1951 movie The Strip. The song, as sung by Louis Armstrong, was nominated for a Best Song Oscar; Armstrong was forever after connected with it.

== Family and death ==
Bert Kalmar married Jessie Brown (a vaudeville performer) on September 20, 1910, in San Francisco, California. Jessie, born Jessica, debuted as a specialty dancer in 1907 and went on to toe dancing. She danced with husband Bert Kalmar in Nurseryland (1916) and other acts before retiring in the late 1910s. She was portrayed by Vera-Ellen in the film, Three Little Words. She died in January 1985 in Sherman Oaks, California.

Bert and Jessie had two children. Bert Kalmar Jr., born Irving Albert Kalmar in 1913 and died in 1997. Margaret "Peggy" Kalmar was born in 1928. She married in 1950 to Robert Allison in 1950 and died in 1964.

Bert died in Los Angeles, California on September 18, 1947 (aged 63). He is buried in Forest Lawn Memorial Park in Glendale, California.

Broadway

- Ziegfeld Follies of 1920 (1920) - revue - featured co-songwriter for "I'm a Vamp from East Broadway"
- Helen of Troy, New York (1923) - co-composer and co-lyricist with Harry Ruby
- Ziegfeld Follies of 1923 (1923) - revue - featured lyricist for "Society Bud"
- No Other Girl (1924) - co-composer and co-lyricist with Harry Ruby
- Holka Polka (1925) - book-editor
- The Ramblers (1926) - co-composer, co-lyricist, and co-bookwriter with Harry Ruby
- Lucky (1927) - co-writer with Otto Harbach, Harry Ruby and Jerome Kern
- The Five O'Clock Girl (1927) and (1981 revival) - lyricist with composer Harry Ruby
- She's My Baby (1928) - co-bookwriter with Harry Ruby
- Top Speed (1929) - co-writer and co-producer with Harry Ruby and Guy Bolton
- High Kickers (1941) - co-composer, co-lyricist with Harry Ruby and co-bookwriter with Ruby and George Jessel
- The Corn is Green (1943) - actor in the role of "Will Hughes"
- Fosse (1999) - revue - featured lyricist for "Who's Sorry Now?"

Notable songs

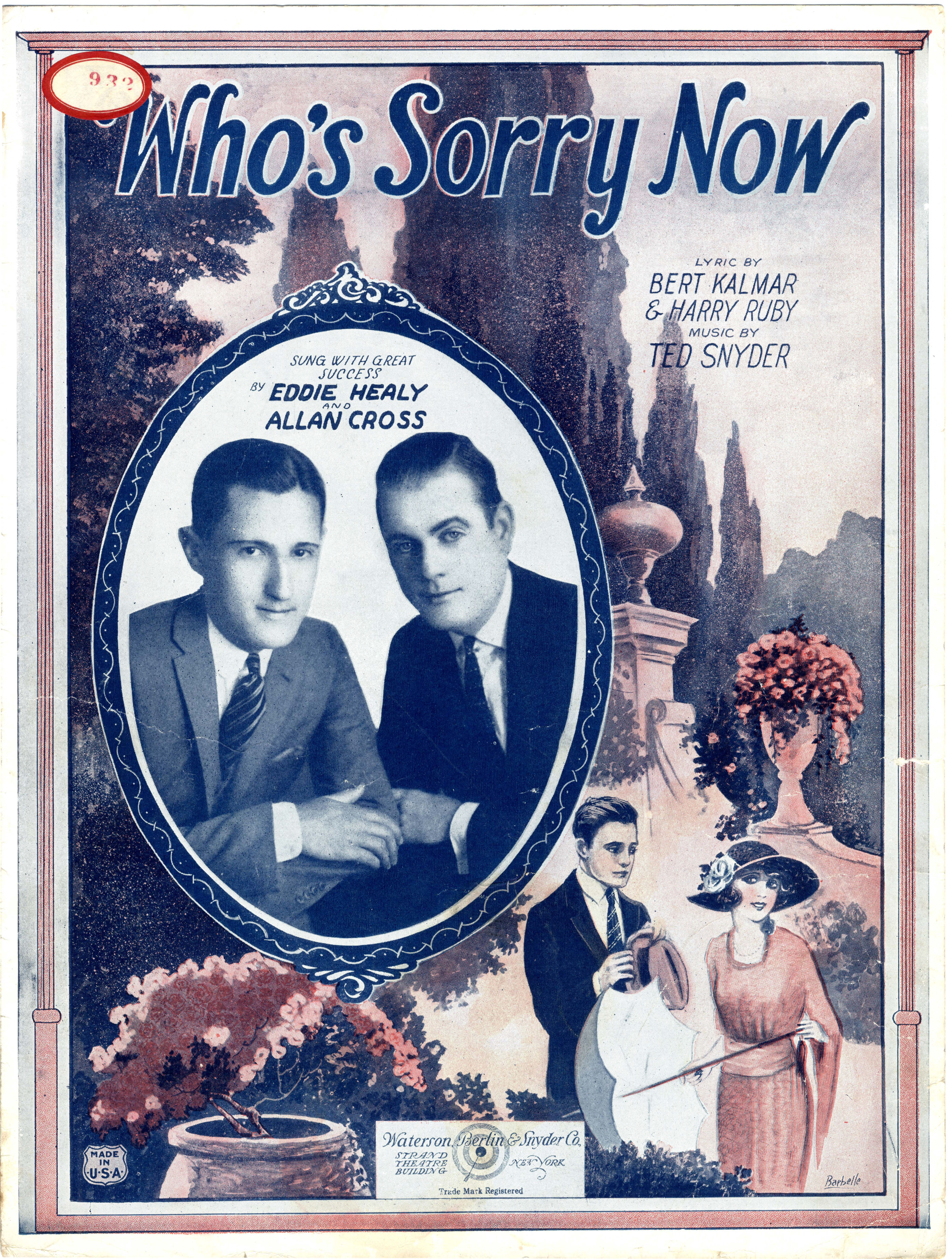
Front cover of 1923 sheet music for "Who's Sorry Now?"

- "Who's Sorry Now?" (1923), Kalmar and Ruby's first big hit
- "I Wanna Be Loved by You" (1928), a hit for Helen Kane, known as the "Boop-boop-a-doop girl", and sung by Marilyn Monroe in the film Some Like It Hot
- "Hooray for Captain Spaulding" from Animal Crackers (1928): became Groucho Marx's signature tune.
- "I Love You So Much" (1928)
- "Three Little Words" (1930), their biggest hit.
- "Nevertheless" (1931), a hit for both Bing Crosby and Rudy Vallée, later done by The Mills Brothers and Frank Sinatra
- "I'm Against It", "I Always Get My Man" and "Everyone Says I Love You" from Horse Feathers (1932)
- "Hail, Hail Freedonia" from Duck Soup (1933)
- "What a Perfect Combination" (1932), lyrics by Kalmar and Irving Caesar, music by Ruby and Harry Akst, written for the Broadway show The Kid, starring Eddie Cantor
- "A Kiss to Build a Dream On" (1935), their last hit
- "Show Me a Rose" (1952), Groucho Marx recording
- "The Real McCoys" (1957-1963), television theme (words & music by Harry Ruby)
