= Waterson, Berlin & Snyder, Inc. =

American music publisher 1918–1929

- Founded: 1917 (as Waterson, Berlin & Snyder, Inc.)
- Founder: Ted Snyder; Henry Waterson; Irving Berlin
- Defunct: 1929
- Fate: Bankrupt in 1929
- Headquarters: New York City, U.S.
- Products: Popular sheet music

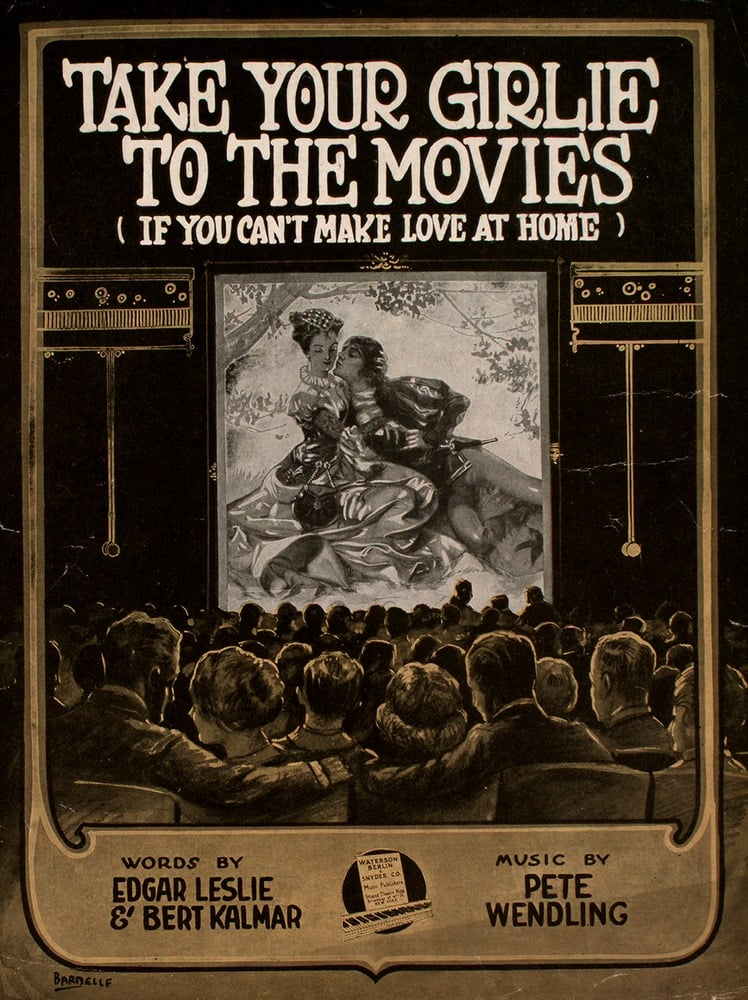
Illustrated cover of sheet music for "Take Your Girlie to the Movies (If You Can't Make Love at Home)"

Waterson, Berlin & Snyder, Inc. was, during the 1920s, one of the largest music publishers of popular sheet music in the country. The firm was based in New York City. What began as the Ted Snyder Company in 1908 evolved into Waterson, Berlin & Snyder, Inc., in 1917 when its founder, Ted Snyder (1881–1965), took on two partners – Henry Waterson (1873–1933) and Irving Berlin (1888–1989). Berlin had been Ted Snyder's staff lyricist since 1909.

Snyder left the company in 1927 to move to California. Waterson, Berlin & Snyder went bankrupt in 1929; and, as part of the bankruptcy sale, Jack Mills, of Mills Music, Inc., purchased its catalog for $5000.

It was rare for black composers to be involved in Tin Pan Alley, which, for Mills Music, represented a business opportunity. Through subsidiaries (such as Milsons, Exclusive, Grand, and American Academy of Music), Mills marketed Duke Ellington to different audiences. This strategy helped elevate Mills as major player in the music publishing business.
