= The Pepsodent Show =

American radio show (1938–1948)

- Genre: Comedy
- Running time: 30 minutes
- Country of origin: United States
- Language: English
- Syndicates: NBC
- Starring: Bob Hope; Jerry Colonna; Skinnay Ennis; Blanche Stewart; Elvia Allman; Judy Garland; Frances Langford; The Desi Arnaz Orchestra (more)
- Announcer: Bill Goodwin; Wendell Niles; Art Baker; Larry Keating
- Written by: (see below)
- Directed by: Bill Lawrence; Norman Morrell; Bob Stephenson; Al Capstaff
- Produced by: Bill Lawrence; Norman Morrell; Bob Stephenson; Al Capstaff
- Original release: September 27, 1938 – June 8, 1948
- No. of episodes: 132 (according to the Radio Gold Index); 150 (other sources)
- Opening theme: Thanks for the Memory
- Sponsored by: Pepsodent

The Pepsodent Show is an American radio comedy program broadcast from 1938 to 1948, during the Golden Age of Radio. The program starred Bob Hope and Jerry Colonna, alongside Blanche Stewart, Elvia Allman, and a continuously rotating supporting cast of actors and musicians which included, for a time, Judy Garland, Frances Langford, and Desi Arnaz and his orchestra.

The Pepsodent Show was broadcast Tuesday nights at 10:00 over NBC from September 27, 1938 to June 8, 1948. For most of its run, Pepsodent followed Fibber McGee and Molly on Tuesdays and preceded The Raleigh Cigarette Program starring Red Skelton. The Pepsodent Show, along with Edgar Bergen's Chase and Sanborn Hour, Jack Benny's The Jack Benny Program, and Fred Allen's Texaco Star Theatre, was one of the most listened-to programs during World War II.

== Background ==
=== Pepsodent toothpaste ===
Pepsodent toothpaste sponsored the program for its entire 10-year run. Pepsodent was founded by Pepsodent Company based in Chicago in 1915. The namesake of Pepsodent came from pepsin. Pepsin is a digestive enzyme designed to break down and digest food deposits on the teeth. Pepsin was an ingredient used in early Pepsodent toothpaste.

By the late 1920s, sales for Pepsodent had plummeted to the point of near bankruptcy. In an effort to boost sales, Pepsodent became the official sponsor of Amos 'n' Andy, a continuation of WGN's popular Sam 'n' Henry starring Freeman Gosden and Charles Correll. The first Pepsodent sponsored episode of Amos 'n' Andy aired on August 19, 1929.

It was also during the run of Amos 'n' Andy that Pepsodent began advertising the supposed ingredient Irium. Irium is another word for sodium lauryl sulfate, an inexpensive ionic surfactant. Even though the advertising was convincing enough for people to actually believe that Irium is real, in a 1994 speech, then-FCC chairman Reed Hundt claimed that the "Irium" mentioned in Pepsodent advertisements "didn't exist".

=== Bob Hope ===
Hope was born Leslie Townes Hope to British parents in Eltham, London on May 29, 1903. Hope, along with his parents and siblings emigrated to the United States aboard the SS Philadelphia and passed through Ellis Island on March 30, 1908, before moving to Cleveland, Ohio.

Hope first entered show business in the 1920s joining the Vaudeville circuit. Around 1928, Hope adopted the name Bob as he believed it was a more stage-friendly name. During the early 1930s, Hope began a gig with New York's Palace Theatre and also performed in his first Broadway play as part of the cast of 1930's Smiles. Hope soon found himself a part of the cast of 1932's Ballyhoo of 1932 and Jerome Kern's Roberta in 1933. In 1936, Hope shared star billing with Ethel Merman and Jimmy Durante in Cole Porter's Broadway musical Red, Hot and Blue.

Hope made his radio debut in 1933 during the talent portion of Rudy Vallée's The Fleischmann's Yeast Hour. Hope appeared in his first feature film The Big Broadcast of 1938 in 1938. His fellow co-stars included W.C. Fields, Dorothy Lamour, Shirley Ross and Martha Raye.

==== The Intimate Revue ====
After Hope's success on The Rudy Vallée Show, NBC offered Hope his own radio show, The Intimate Revue, the first of several precursors to The Pepsodent Show. The Intimate Revue premiered on the Blue Network on January 4, 1935. Sponsored by Emerson's Bromo-Seltzer, alongside Hope in the starring cast were singers James Melton, Jane Froman and Patricia Wilder with musical accompaniment from Al Goodman. The program ended on April 5, 1935.

==== The Atlantic Family ====
Hope's next radio program, The Atlantic Family, was for Atlantic Oil. This program premiered on CBS on September 14, 1935. The program ended its run nearly a whole year after it began on September 3, 1936. The program aired Saturdays at 7 for most of its run until moving to Thursdays at 7 for the last three months. Wilder came with Hope to this series alongside tenor Frank Parker with Red Nichols and his Five Pennies providing the music.

==== The Rippling Rhythm Revue/The Woodbury Soap Show and Your Hollywood Parade ====
In May 1937, Hope signed a 26-week contract for the new The Rippling Rhythm Revue, (alternative title: The Woodbury Soap Show) sponsored by Woodbury soap. Hope began his 26 weeks on May 9, 1937 back on the Blue Network. The show's name derived from a musical gimmick by maestro Shep Fields in which Fields would blow bubbles while his orchestra played music.

Along with Fields leading his orchestra and Hope in the role of host, Frank Parker from The Atlantic Family was again brought on as lead tenor. The program aired Sundays at 9 until the end of the 26 weeks on September 6, 1937.

On December 29, Hope joined the cast of Your Hollywood Parade on NBC. Sponsored by American Tobacco's Lucky Strike cigarettes, the program originally starred Dick Powell and was a spin-off of the popular music program Your Hit Parade. Airing Wednesdays at 10, Hope hosted the program for a single season ending his association with Lucky Strike on March 23, 1938.

== Production ==
The Pepsodent Show Starring Bob Hope premiered on Tuesday night September 27, 1938, over the stations of the National Broadcasting Company. Hope was the star of the program with Jerry Colonna as Hope's sidekick. Each program usually began with an opening monologue by Hope, a little banter with Colonna, a couple exchanges and a few skits with other members of the cast and the week's guest stars and finally a concluding skit.

The original Pepsodent cast consisted of Bob Hope, Jerry Colonna, Blanche Stewart and Elvia Allman. Stewart and Allman portrayed high-society crazies Brenda and Cobina, respectively. Bill Goodwin was the program's original announcer, Skinnay Ennis was the program's original bandleader and Judy Garland, 16 at the time, was the program's original vocalist, beginning September 26, 1939. The program's cast changed often over the course of the ten years Pepsodent was on the air. In total, during the run of The Pepsodent Show, listeners heard the arrival and departure of four announcers, five vocalists and three bandleaders. Among the program's other vocalists were Frances Langford and Doris Day and among the bandleaders to be heard on the program were Les Brown and Desi Arnaz.

The Pepsodent Show soon became a part of the most listened-to radio programs in America and Bob Hope soon became a household name, due in part because of his opening monologue at the beginning of the program which has been noted as the most popular part of each episode. Originally Hope had a team of eight writers whom he paid out of his salary $2500 a week to compose the jokes and materials he used for the each show. Included in the original team of Pepsodent writers were Mel Shavelson, Norman Panama, Jack Rose, Sherwood Schwartz, and Schwartz's brother Al. His writing eventually grew to fifteen and some of the newcomers to the show included Milt Josefsberg, Larry Gelbart and Hal Block.

=== World War II ===
The program saw its highest ratings during World War II. According to Crossley, Pepsodent was the no. 1 rated program on the air for two consecutive years (1942–43; 1943–44) receiving a Hooperating of 40.9 in 1942.

As the war ensued, Hope tried to enlist in the service. However, he was told he could better serve as an entertainer. With that, Hope joined the United Service Organizations (USO). With his USO troupe, Hope traveled to the likes of Sicily, England, Alaska, North Africa and the South Pacific entertaining the servicemen and women in the military. Hope also became a regular performer on the Armed Forces Radio Network.

Even with Hope constantly traveling overseas to perform for the troops, The Pepsodent Show still continued production. Soon after Hope joined the USO, The Pepsodent Show began broadcasting from military bases across the country. The May 6, 1941, installment of the radio series aired from March Army Air Force Field in Riverside, California. This was the first remote broadcast of Hope's coast-to-coast radio program and became the first of hundreds of radio and television broadcasts Hope performed for the entertainment of U.S. soldiers. Broadcasting in front of a live audience of soldiers and gearing the subject matter of the monologue to the troops, Hope fashioned a very successful variant on the radio comedy variety format. World War II-era stateside radio audiences, as well as the troops, appreciated Hope's soldier-directed monologues, which provided home audiences with a special affinity with the soldiers' lives and their contributions to the country. Gerd Horten, author of the book Radio Goes to War, documents in this book, about seven Pepsodent episodes aired between 1941 and 1943 broadcast from different military bases across the nation.

=== Swan Soap and The Bob Hope Show ===
The Bob Hope Show
- Genre: Comedy
- Running time: 30 minutes
- Country of origin: United States
- Language: English
- Syndicates: NBC
- Starring: Bob Hope; Doris Day
- Announcer: Hy Averback
- Original release: September 14, 1948 – April 21, 1955
- Sponsored by: Swan Soap; Chesterfield; Jell-O; American Dairy; General Foods

After the war, The Pepsodent Show steadily began to decline in the ratings. By 1948, ratings were so low that Pepsodent pulled sponsorship and on Tuesday June 8, 1948, the last broadcast of The Pepsodent Show aired over NBC.

Despite cancellation, Hope still continued on radio. Lever Brothers' Swan soap began sponsoring The Bob Hope Show. The Bob Hope Show premiered on September 14, 1948 on NBC. By this point, most of the regulars from The Pepsodent Show left to further pursue their careers. Doris Day, who was the vocalist for The Pepsodent Show after Gloria Jean's departure, was the only one of Hope's Pepsodent co-stars who continued to perform on The Bob Hope Show. Hy Averback was the announcer.

Airing Tuesdays at 9, the program was at direct competition with the new sitcom Life with Luigi, which aired at the same time on CBS. Life with Luigi proved to be the season's new hit, crushing The Bob Hope Show in the ratings. Like Pepsodent before, due to the poor ratings, Swan pulled its sponsorship of The Bob Hope Show in 1950. The last Swan-sponsored episode of the program aired on June 13.

The next fall on October 3, The Bob Hope Show premiered under the sponsorship of Chesterfield cigarettes. Over the next five years, The Bob Hope Show aired under various sponsors, including Jell-O and General Foods, in various timeslots until its final episode aired on April 21, 1955.

== Broadcast history ==
=== The Pepsodent Show ===
For the entirety of the program's ten-year run (September 27, 1938 – June 8, 1948), The Pepsodent Show was broadcast on Tuesday nights from 10 to 10:30. The Pepsodent Show aired immediately after Fibber McGee and Molly, another one of radio's most popular shows. For six years, (1941–44; 1945–48), The Pepsodent Show was followed by Red Skelton's Raleigh Cigarette Program at 10:30.

=== The Bob Hope Show ===
Timeslot	Starting date	Ending date	Network	Sponsor
Tuesdays at 9-9:30 pm	September 14, 1948	June 13, 1950	NBC	Swan Soap
Tuesdays at 9-9:30 pm	October 3, 1950	1952	NBC	Chesterfield
Wednesdays at 10-10:30 pm	1953		NBC	Jell-O
Fridays at 8:30-9:00 pm	1953	1954	NBC	American Dairy Association
Thursdays at 8:3-9:00 pm	1954	April 21, 1955	NBC	American Dairy Association
Weekdays at 9:30-9:45 am 11:45 am-12 pm 10:30-10:45 am	November 10, 1952	July 9, 1954	NBC	General Foods

== Cast and crew ==
=== Cast ===
==== Main ====
- Bob Hope
- Jerry Colonna as Hope's madcap
- Blanche Stewart as Brenda
- Elvia Allman as Cobina
- Barbara Jo Allen as Vera Vague
- Trudy Erwin as the Pepsodent girl

=== Crew ===
==== Music ====
===== Conductors =====
- Skinnay Ennis (bandleader; 1938-1943)
- Stan Kenton (maestro; 1943-1946)
- Desi Arnaz (bandleader; 1946-1947)
- Les Brown (bandleader; 1947-1948)

===== Vocalists =====
- Judy Garland (1939-1940)
- Frances Langford (1939-1947)
- Gloria Jean (1947-1948)
- Doris Day (1947-1950)

==== Announcers ====
- Bill Goodwin
- Wendell Niles
- Art Baker
- Larry Keating

==== Producer-Directors ====
- Bill Lawrence
- Norman Morrell
- Bob Stephenson
- Al Capstaff

==== Writers ====
- Melville Shavelson
- Milt Josefsberg
- Norman Sullivan
- Norman Panama
- Jack Rose
- Sherwood Schwartz
- Al Schwartz
- Melvin Frank
- Dave Murray
- Larry Markes
- Larry Gelbart
- Mort Lachman
- Marv Fischer
- Paul Laven
- Jack Douglas
- Hal Block
- Ted McKay
- Samuel Kurtzman
- Fred Fox
- Wilkie Mahoney

== After Pepsodent ==
After the end of The Pepsodent Show, sales of Pepsodent toothpaste still were steady. Pepsodent also still continued to sponsor popular programs on the radio. Pepsodent sponsored CBS's popular comedy My Friend Irma in the evening and Arthur Godfrey Time and Art Linkletter's House Party during the daytime. Pepsodent's sales began to decline during the 1960s as people became aware of the role of fluoride in cavity protection. As brands such as Colgate, Crest and Gleem began incorporating fluoride in their toothpastes, Pepsodent was hesitant to do so, leading to the increasing popularity of those three brands and the decline in popularity for Pepsodent. Pepsodent did eventually add fluoride in their toothpaste but not before sales for Pepsodent plummeted to an all-time low. In 2003, household-manufacturing company Church & Dwight purchased the Pepsodent brand rights in the United States from Unilever. Pepsodent continues to be sold today.

As far as Bob Hope, after Pepsodent and The Bob Hope Show, Hope moved into the new medium of television. Hope was most famous for his television specials on NBC, the first special airing in April 1950. The specials were often sponsored by General Motors (1955–61), Chrysler (1963–73), and Texaco (1975–85). Chrysler also sponsored Bob Hope Presents the Chrysler Theatre, Hope's weekly anthology series on NBC during the 1960s.

Hope also continued performing with the USO for 50 years until 1991 and was made an "honorary veteran" by President Bill Clinton in 1997. Hope was honored for his contributions to radio in 1990 when he was inducted into the Radio Hall of Fame. Hope continued performing well into his 90s and died at the age of 100 on July 27, 2003 in his home in Toluca Lake, California of pneumonia. Hope was interred in the Bob Hope Memorial Garden at San Fernando Mission Cemetery in Los Angeles.
