= Bill Hay (radio announcer) =

- Born: William Gibiral Hay; April 18, 1887; Dumfries, Scotland
- Died: October 12, 1978 (aged 91); Santa Monica, California

William Gibiral Hay (18 April 1887 - 12 October 1978) was an American radio announcer who was famous for his many years of work on the Amos 'n' Andy show with Charles Correll and Freeman Gosden.

== Biography ==
Hay was born on 18 April 1887 in Dumfries, Scotland. He migrated to the United States at age 22 in 1909. He became a citizen on 25 January 1917.

He got his start in radio at Westinghouse station KFKX in Hastings, Nebraska. In 1927 that station's operations were moved to Chicago, Illinois. Gosden and Correll had a show similar to Amos 'n' Andy called Sam 'n' Henry at Chicago radio station WGN, but after a dispute in 1927, they took the program's concept and WGN announcer Bill Hay across town to WMAQ. The Amos 'n' Andy team created the first syndicated radio show in history. The sponsor of Amos 'n' Andy, Pepsodent, contractually stipulated that no one but Bill Hay was ever to announce their show.

Hay died on 12 October 1978 in Santa Monica, California.

== Legacy ==
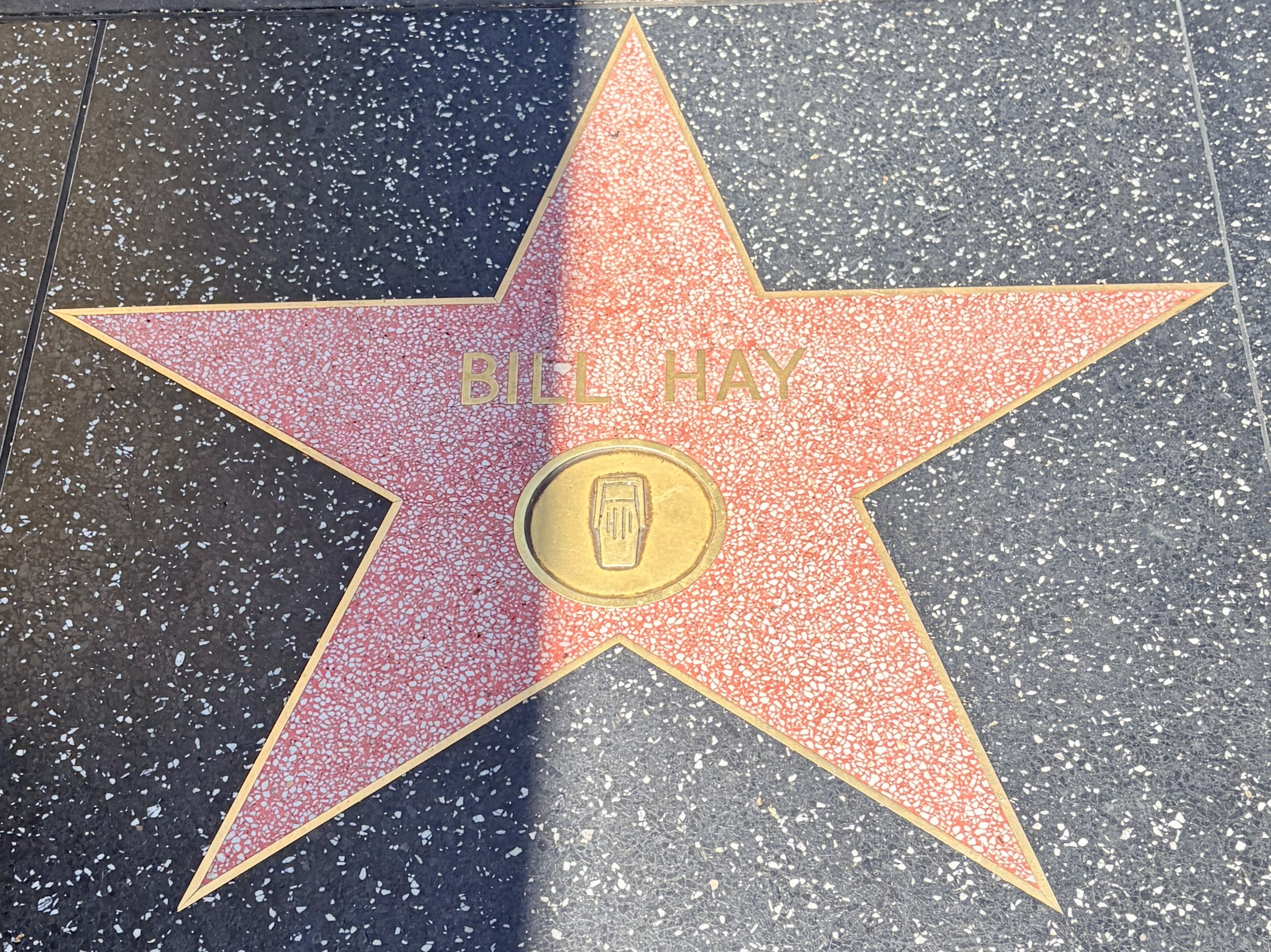
Hollywood Walk of Fame star

Bill Hay has a star on the Hollywood Walk of Fame.
