= 1926 in radio =

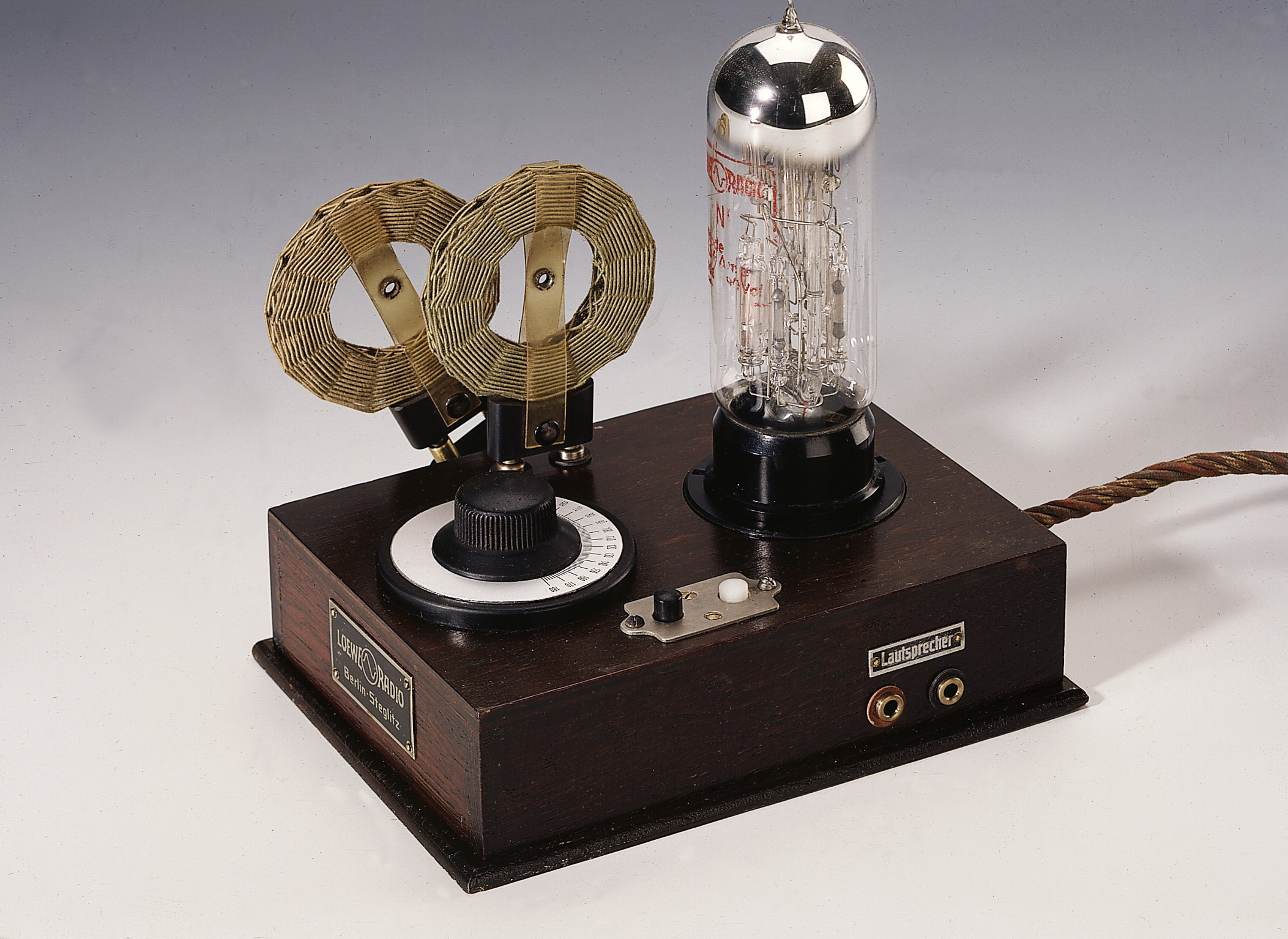
Loewe local receiver OE 333, 1926

The year 1926 saw a number of significant happenings in radio broadcasting history.

== Events ==
- 1 January – 2RN, the first radio broadcasting station in the Irish Free State, goes on air.
- 12 January – Freeman Gosden and Charles Correll premiere their radio program Sam 'n' Henry in the United States, in which the two white performers portray two black characters from Harlem looking to strike it rich in the big city (it is a precursor to Gosden and Correll's more popular later program, Amos 'n' Andy).
- 16 January – A British Broadcasting Company radio play by Ronald Knox about workers' revolution in London causes a panic among those who have not heard the preliminary announcement that it is a satire on broadcasting.
- 25/26 February – A majority share in German national broadcaster Reichs-Rundfunk-Gesellschaft is taken by the state-owned Reichspost authority.
- 18 April – The Polskie Radio company begins regular broadcasts from Warsaw, Poland.
- 4 May – The British Broadcasting Company broadcasts five news bulletins a day as no newspapers are being published due to the 1926 United Kingdom general strike.
- 6 May – First radio broadcast of a complete opera – Attilio Parelli's I dispettosi amanti – by the Milan station of the Unione Radiofonica Italiana (URI).
- 15 May
  - American Telephone & Telegraph establishes the Broadcasting Company of America; containing WCAP in Washington, D.C., WEAF in New York, and the mini-network between both stations.
  - Radio Zagreb, the first radio station in southeastern Europe, begins broadcasting.
- 29 May
  - The Finnish national broadcasting company Yleisradio is founded.
  - VPRO (the Vrijzinnig Protestantse Radio Omroep) is established in the Netherlands.
- 12 June – Radio Kaunas begins regular broadcasting in Lithuania.
- 1 July – American Telephone & Telegraph exits the station ownership realm, selling off WEAF, WCAP, and their mini-network, to RCA. The latter station is merged into time-share WRC (AM) and takes the latter stations' callsign.
- 13 September – Formation of the National Broadcasting Company by RCA is announced in newspaper advertisements around the country.
- 7 October – The British Broadcasting Company begins broadcasting a weekly service of Choral Evensong, with the first recorded service being held in Westminster Abbey. Choral Evensong will pass its centenary in 2026, making it the longest-running regular outside broadcast.
- 10 November – Unión Radio takes over station EAJ-1 Radio Barcelona, laying the foundation for the creation of Spain's first national radio network.
- 14 November – The first Geneva Frequency Plan comes into force, halving the number of medium wave frequencies available to countries in Europe.
- 18 December – Regular radio broadcasting begins in Estonia.
- 24 December – The first singing jingle commercial is heard on WCCO, Minneapolis, Minnesota.

== Debuts ==
- 12 January – Sam 'n' Henry debuts on WGN in Chicago, Illinois. Two years later, the creators of the show, Freeman Gosden and Charles Correll, leave and start the similar show Amos 'n' Andy.
- 26 February – 1150 AM returns to the air, this time as WJBO in New Orleans.
- 1 November – Radio Belgique (1924–30) broadcasts the first edition of Le Journal Parlé: "All the world's and all the day's news in thirty minutes".
- 15 November – The National Broadcasting Company (NBC) commences operations on what will later become the NBC Red Network, composed of AT&T's WEAF-WCAP mini-network.
- 24 November – KVI in Tacoma, Washington, signs on the air for the first time.
- 13 December – WWVA at Wheeling, West Virginia signs on at 2A.M. from owner John Stroebel's residence.
- 23 December – KEX in Portland, Oregon begins broadcasting.

== Births ==
- 22 February – Kenneth Williams, English comic actor (died 1988)
- 9 March – Joe Franklin, American broadcast media personality (died 2015)
- 19 May – David Jacobs, British broadcast presenter (died 2013)
- 23 May – Desmond Carrington, English disc jockey and actor (died 2017)
- 22 June – Ray Szmanda, American radio and television announcer (died 2018)
- 27 August – Pat Coombs, English comic stooge (died 2002)
- 12 September – Peter Dixon "Dix" Davis, American radio and film actor (died 2024)
- 30 September – Dave Hunt, American Christian apologist and radio commentator (died 2013)
- 31 October – Jimmy Savile, English disc jockey, television presenter, philanthropist and serial sex offender (died 2011)
- 14 November – Tom Hatten, American broadcast media personality (died 2019)
