= Alvin Childress =

American actor (1907–1986)

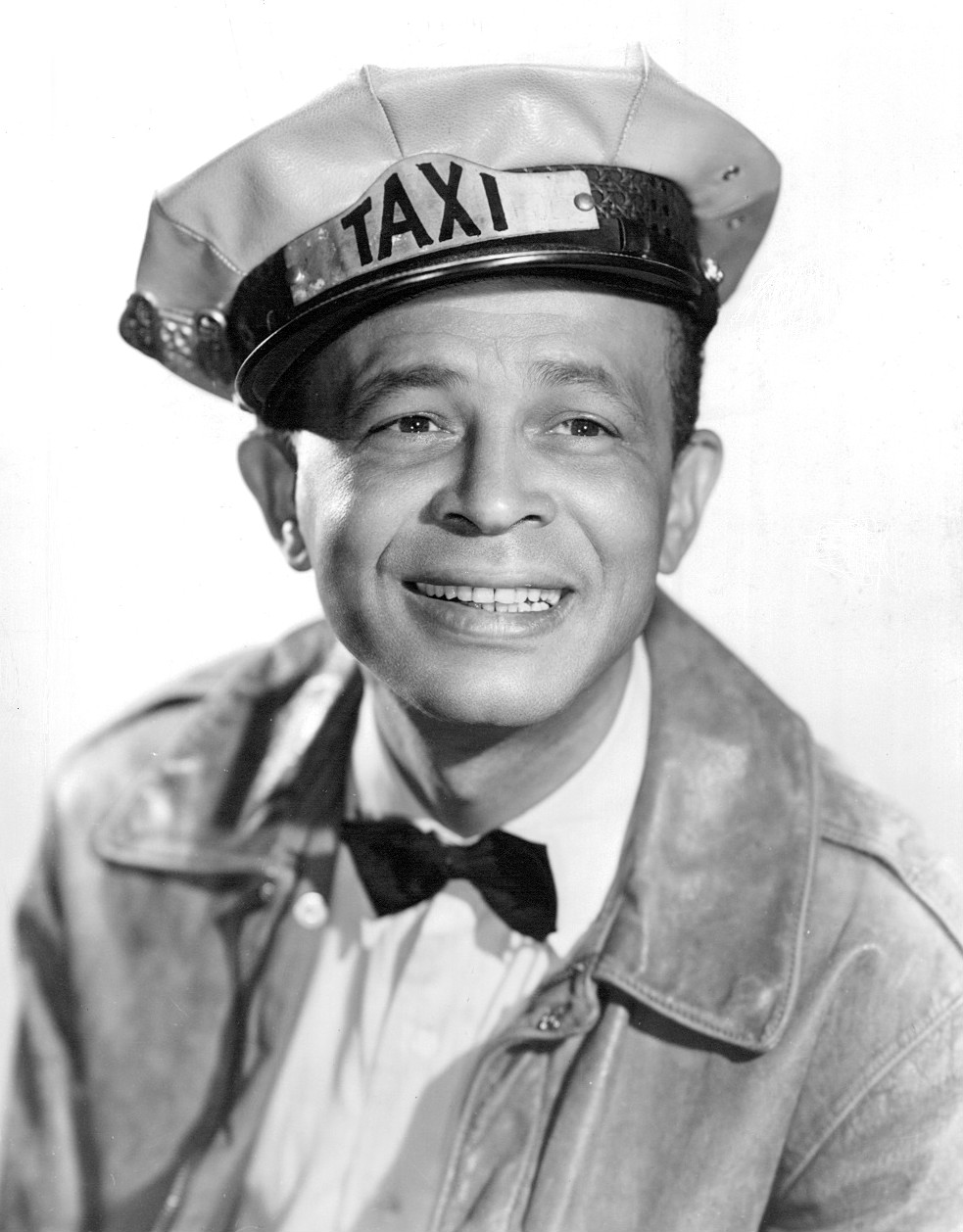
- Alvin Childress as Amos, 1951
- Born: Emory Alvin Childress; September 15, 1907; Meridian, Mississippi, U.S.
- Died: April 19, 1986 (aged 78); Inglewood, California, U.S.
- Occupation: Actor
- Years active: 1931–1982
- Spouses: Alice Herndon (m. 1934; div. 1957): Sophie Child

Alvin Childress (September 15, 1907 – April 19, 1986) was an American actor, who is best known for playing the cabdriver Amos Jones in the 1950s television comedy series Amos 'n' Andy.

== Biography ==
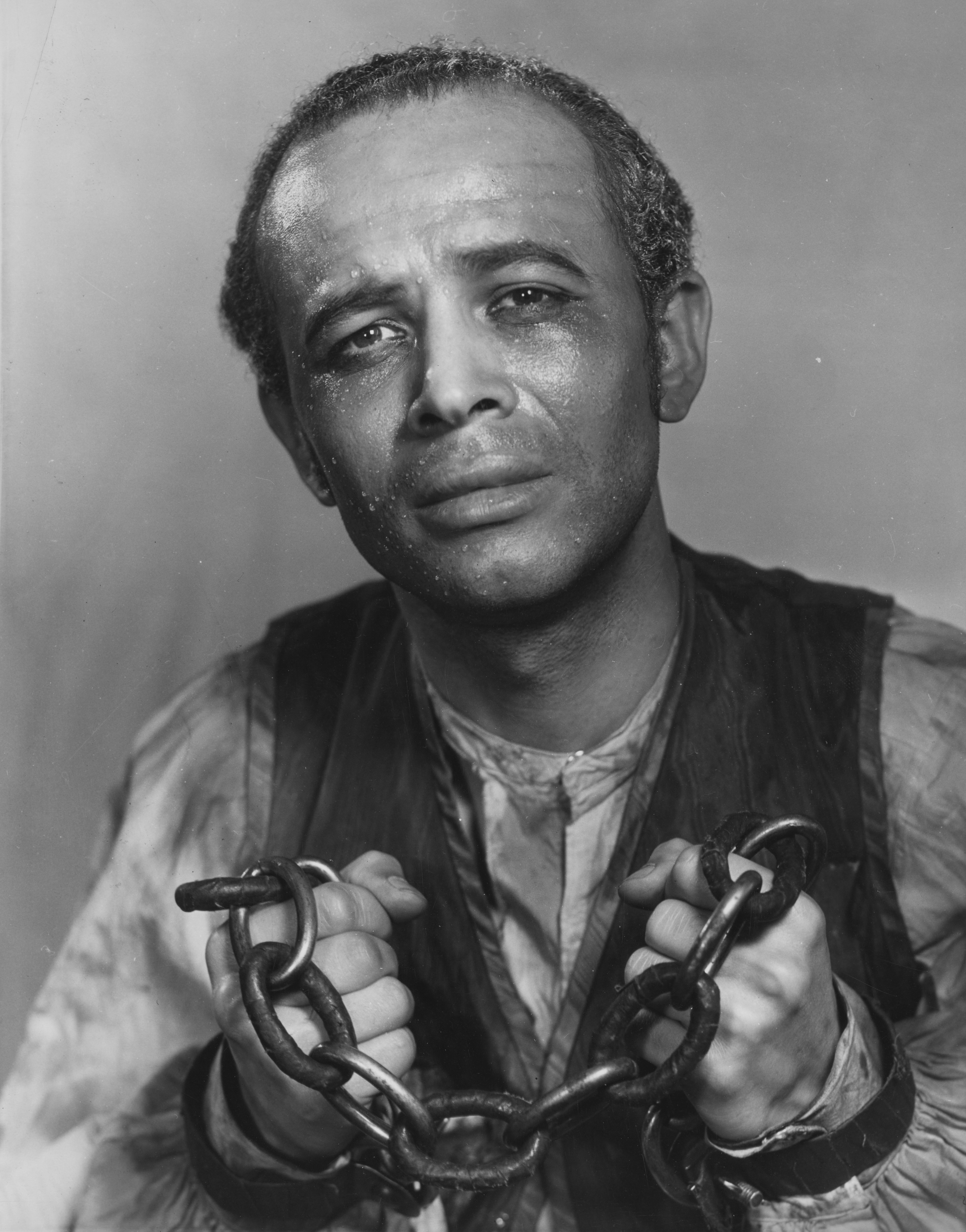
Childress as Jacques in the Federal Theatre Project production of Haiti at the Lafayette Theatre (1938)

Alvin Childress was born in Meridian, Mississippi. He was educated at Rust College, from which he received a Bachelor of Arts degree in sociology. When he initially entered college, Childress intended to become a doctor, enrolling in typical pre-med courses. He had no thoughts of becoming involved in acting, but became involved in theater outside of classes.

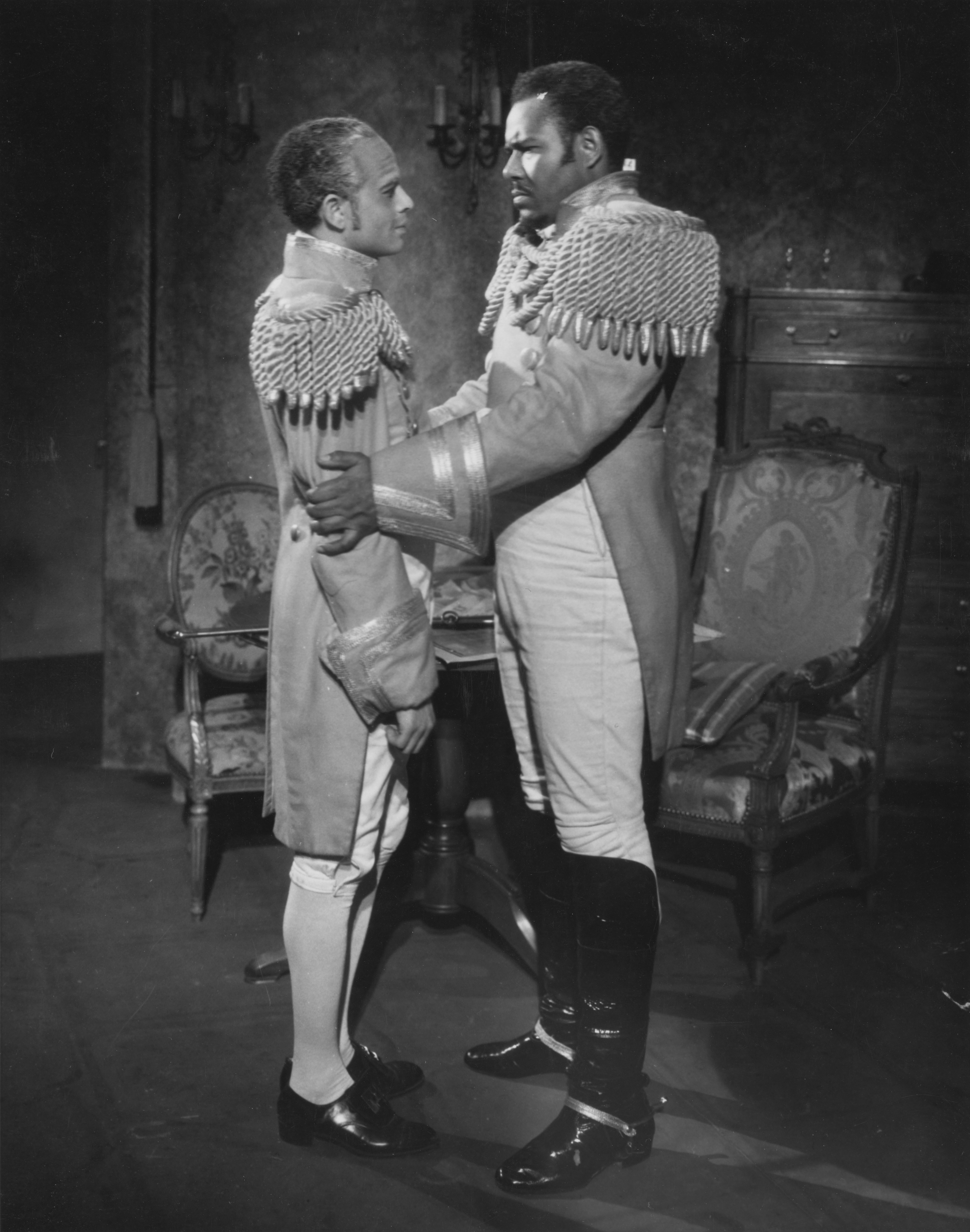
Childress and Rex Ingram in the Federal Theatre Project production of Haiti (1938)

Childress moved to New York City and became an actor with Harlem's Lafayette Players, a troupe of stock players associated with the Lafayette Theatre. Soon, he was engaged as an actor in the Federal Theater Project, the American Negro Theater, and in all-black race film productions such as Keep Punching (1939). His greatest success on the stage was his performance as Noah in the popular drama, Anna Lucasta, which ran for 957 performances. He also worked at Teachers College of Columbia University. Childress also operated his own radio and record store in New York City. When he learned about casting for the Amos 'n' Andy television series, Childress decided to audition for a role. He was hired a year before the show went on the air.

In 1951, he was cast as the level-headed, hard-working and honest Amos Jones in the popular television series, The Amos 'n' Andy Show, which ran for two years on CBS. Childress originally tried out for the role of The Kingfish, but Charles Correll and Freeman Gosden cast him as Amos. Since he had been hired a year before the show began, Gosden and Correll turned the search for an actor to play "The Kingfish" over to Childress. In a 1979 interview, Childress shared information about some of the candidates. Cab Calloway was considered but found wanting by Gosden because of his straight hair. Childress said there were many famous men, with and without actual acting experience, who wanted to play the role. Eventually, old-time vaudeville comedian Tim Moore was cast as the Kingfish.

Shortly after the television show had ended, plans to turn it into a vaudeville act were announced in 1953, with Childress, Williams and Moore playing the same roles as they had in the television series. It is not known if there were any performances. In 1956, after the television show was no longer in production, Childress and some of his fellow cast members: Tim Moore, Spencer Williams, and Lillian Randolph along with her choir, began a tour of the US as "The TV Stars of Amos 'n' Andy". The tour was halted by CBS as the network considered this an infringement of their rights to the program and its cast of characters. Despite the threats which ended the 1956 tour, Childress, along with Moore, Williams and Johnny Lee were able to perform one night in 1957 in Windsor, Ontario, apparently without legal action. When he tried for work as an actor, Childress found none as he was typecast as Amos Jones. For a short time, Childress found himself parking cars for an upscale Beverly Hills restaurant.

Childress also appeared in roles on the television series Perry Mason, Sanford and Son, Good Times and The Jeffersons and in the films Thunderbolt and Lightfoot (1974) and The Day of the Locust (1975). When Childress appeared as a minister in a 1972 episode of Sanford and Son, he was reunited with two former cast members: Lillian Randolph of Amos 'n' Andy in the role of Aunt Hazel and Lance Taylor, Jr. of Anna Lucasta, with the role of Uncle Edgar.

Childress's first wife was the former Alice Herndon, who established herself as a successful writer and actress under the name of Alice Childress (1916–1994); the couple was married from 1934 to 1957 and had a daughter, Jean Rosa. From 1961 to 1973, Childress worked as an unemployment interviewer for the Los Angeles Department of Personnel and in the Civil Service Commission of Los Angeles County.

== Death ==
Childress suffered from diabetes and other ailments. He died at age 78 on April 19, 1986, in Inglewood, California. He was buried at National Memorial Harmony Park in Landover, Maryland.

== Stage and screen credits ==
Selected stage credits

- Savage Rhythm (1931)
- Sweet Land (1936)
- Brown Sugar (1937)
- The Case of Philip Lawrence (1937)
- Haiti (1938)
- Hell's Alley (1938)
- Natural Man (1941)
- Two on an Island (1942)
- Anna Lucasta (1944–46)
- Striver's Row (1946)
- The Amen Corner (1968)

Selected screen credits

- Hell's Alley (1931)
- Harlem is Heaven (1932)
- Out of the Crimson Fog (1932)
- Dixie Love (1934)
- Keep Punching (1939)
- Anna Lucasta (1958) – Noah
- The Man in the Net (1959) – Alonzo (uncredited)
- High Time (1960) – Guest Announcer at Judge Carter's Ball (uncredited)
- Thunderbolt and Lightfoot (1974) – Janitor
- The Day of the Locust (1975) – Butler
- Darktown Strutters (1975) – Bo
- The Bingo Long Traveling All-Stars & Motor Kings (1976) – Horace Quigley, Owner of Atlanta Black Crackers
- The Main Event (1979) – Man In Gym
- Cheech and Chong's Next Movie (1980) – Pinochle Player
