= Pepsodent =

American brand of toothpaste

- Logo of Pepsodent outside US and Canada
- Product type: Toothpaste
- Current owner: Church & Dwight (United States and Canada); Unilever (rest of the world)
- Country: United States
- Introduced: 1915; 111 years ago
- Markets: Worldwide
- Previous owners: Pepsodent Company
- Website: www.pepsodent.com

Pepsodent is an American brand of toothpaste with a minty flavor that is derived from sassafras. The brand was purchased by Unilever in 1942 and is still owned by the company outside of the United States and Canada. In 2003, Unilever sold the rights to the brand in the North American market to Church & Dwight.

== History ==
A tube of Pepsodent toothpaste

Pepsodent toothpaste was introduced in the United States in 1915 by the Pepsodent Company of Chicago. The original formula for the paste contained pepsin, a digestive agent designed to break down and digest food deposits on the teeth, Hence the brand and company name.

From 1930 to late 1933, a massive animated neon advertising sign, featuring a young girl on a swing, hung on West 47th Street in Times Square in New York City. This ad was re-created for the climax of the 2005 film King Kong and was featured in the original film in an establishing shot of Times Square itself.

Following the acquisition of the Pepsodent Company by Unilever in 1944, sales of Pepsodent in the UK increased rapidly, more than doubling between 1944 and 1950. The company outgrew its original factory in Park Royal, and the manufacture of the product was moved to the factory of another Unilever-owned toiletry manufacturer, Joseph Watson and Sons of Whitehall Road, Leeds, in 1951.

Pepsodent was a very popular brand before the mid-1950s, but its makers were slow to add fluoride to its formula to counter the rise of other highly promoted brands such as Crest and Gleem toothpaste by Procter & Gamble, and Colgate's eponymous product; sales of Pepsodent subsequently plummeted. Today Pepsodent is a "value brand" marketed primarily in discount stores and retails for roughly half the price of similarly sized tubes of Crest or of Colgate. Its best-known slogan was, "You'll wonder where the yellow went, when you brush your teeth with Pepsodent!"

The product was discontinued in South Africa in 1974 but was revived in 1976 with a new ad slogan "Gets Your Teeth Their Whitest" featuring celebrity endorsers Rita Moreno, Steve Lawrence, and others. The popular slogan was also changed in South Africa to "You'll wonder where the dullness went, when you brush your teeth with Pepsodent."

Pepsodent is still sold as a Unilever property in all markets except the United States and Canada. In Vietnam, Pepsodent is called P/S. In 2013, Pepsodent was ranked 201st among India's most trusted brands according to the Brand Trust Report 2013 India study, a research conducted by Trust Research Advisory. According to the Brand trust Report 2014, Pepsodent moved up to 71st position among India's most trusted brands. Pepsodent's parent company Hindustan Unilever was ranked 47th in the Trust Report 2014.

== Advertising ==
A U.S. Pepsodent TV advertisement from the late 1950s

Pepsodent was advertised for its purported properties for fighting tooth decay, attributed in advertisements to the supposed ingredient Irium. In a 1994 speech, the chairman of the U.S. Federal Communications Commission, Reed Hundt, claimed that the "Irium" mentioned in Pepsodent advertisements "didn't exist". "Irium" was being used as another name for sodium lauryl sulfate, an ionic surfactant.

Claude C. Hopkins realized teeth had a yellow film on them and he focused his advertisements for Pepsodent on removing that film. Another ingredient, "IMP", which stood for "Insoluble Meta-Phosphate", was claimed to whiten teeth.

Sponsorship from Pepsodent featuring characters from Calvin and the Colonel (1961).

=== Radio program ===
Pepsodent was one of the first consumer products companies to sponsor a radio program. During the thirties and forties, the company sponsored Amos N Andy, and The Pepsodent Show Starring Bob Hope that began airing in 1938 and ran for approximately 10 years on NBC. The show featured Bob Hope and his cast of regular characters such as Jerry Colonna, Barbara Jo Allen as Vera Vague, singers including Frances Langford and Doris Day, and bandleader Skinnay Ennis.

Famous Hollywood guest stars such as Cary Grant, Orson Welles, Judy Garland, Bette Davis, Humphrey Bogart, Paulette Goddard, Dorothy Lamour, Rita Hayworth, Penny Singleton, Arthur Lake, Basil Rathbone, Gary Cooper, Veronica Lake, Ginger Rogers, Edward G. Robinson, Hedda Hopper, and many more would be on hand to trade comedic barbs with Hope. The show was the first radio program to broadcast live from the Hollywood Canteen on October 13, 1942, and soon the show was playing live to U.S. troops during World War II, even including some of the soldiers in the show.

== See also ==
- List of toothpaste brands
- Index of oral health and dental articles
