= Of Black America =

Documentary series

- Genre: Documentary
- Country of origin: United States
- Original language: English
- No. of episodes: 7

Original release
- Network: CBS
- Release: July 2 – September 2, 1968

Of Black America was a series of seven one-hour documentaries presented by CBS News in the summer of 1968, at the end of the Civil Rights Movement and during a time of racial unrest (Martin Luther King had been assassinated that spring and riots in many cities had followed). The groundbreaking series explored various aspects of the history and current state of the African-American community. The executive producer was Perry Wolff, and the series was sponsored by the Xerox Corporation.

The series was presented in prime time at 10:00 PM, on Tuesdays (a slot then usually reserved for CBS Reports documentaries and news shows), except for the last episode which aired on a Monday.

The first installment ("Black History: Lost, Stolen, Strayed") won an Emmy Award and a Writers Guild of America Award for Andy Rooney. Hal Walker, who co-anchored the final segment ("Portrait in Black and White") with Charles Kuralt, was the first African American correspondent for CBS News and one of the first black journalists on national television news. He had just recently joined CBS after winning a local Emmy Award and the Capital Press Club's Journalist of the Year award for his work on "A Dialogue with Whitey", a special report for WTOP about the King assassination riots in Washington, D. C. This final segment featured the results of a large and extensive poll of both African-Americans and whites by Opinion Research Corporation.

== Episodes ==
Number	Title	Producers	Written by	Hosts / Anchors	Original release date
1	"Black History: Lost, Stolen, Strayed"	Andy Rooney, Vern Diamond, Lloyd Weaver	Perry Wolff, Andy Rooney	Bill Cosby	July 2, 1968
Black American heritage, a psychiatrist analyzes African-American and white children's drawings, characterizations of blacks in film, preparing black children for public school. Amos 'n' Andy appear.
2	"The Black Soldier"	Peter Wolff, Lloyd Weaver	Thomas A. Johnson, Jon Wilkman	Bill Cosby	July 9, 1968
History of the military role of African-Americans, from the American Revolutionary War to the Vietnam War which was then being fought.
3	"Black World"	Lloyd Weaver	Andy Rooney, Perry Wolff	Mike Wallace	July 16, 1968
Kinship and degree of cultural interchange between Black America and Black Africa is covered. Ghanaian figures Tom Mboya and Alexander Kwapong appear, along with African-American leaders.
4	"Body and Soul"	Andy Rooney, Martin Carr, Lloyd Weaver	Andy Rooney	John Mosedale, Harry Reasoner	July 30, 1968
Two parts, one on African-American athletes (including clips of Joe Louis, Jackie Robinson, Althea Gibson, Arthur Ashe, Bill Russell, and Jesse Owens) and one, featuring Ray Charles, on musicians (including clips of Lester Young, Billie Holiday, Duke Ellington, Count Basie, Louis Armstrong, Nat "King" Cole, and Aretha Franklin).
5	"The Heritage of Slavery"	Peter Davis, Susan Garfield, Lloyd Weaver	Peter Davis	George Foster	August 13, 1968
Current attitudes of white and black Americans toward African-American history are discussed. Explanation of the slave trade, footage shot in Charleston, South Carolina including the Old Slave Mart Museum, interviews with activist Bill Saunders and editor Lerone Bennett Jr.
6	"In Search of a Past"	Lloyd Weaver	Arthur Rabin	Hal Walker	August 20, 1968
7	"Portrait in Black and White"	Jay L. McMullen, Vern Diamond, Lloyd Weaver	Paul Loewenwarter	Hal Walker, Charles Kuralt	September 2, 1968
Results of a CBS News poll measuring racial attitudes. Walker presents on white racism and changes in white attitudes, Kuralt on African-American extremism and also on black pride.
