= Sitcom =

Broadcast genre; recurring cast comedy

A sitcom (short for situation comedy or situational comedy) is a genre of comedy produced for radio and television that centers on a recurring cast of characters as they navigate humorous situations within a consistent setting, such as a home, workplace, or community. Unlike sketch comedy, which features different characters and settings in each skit, sitcoms typically maintain plot continuity across episodes. This continuity allows for the development of storylines and characters over time, fostering audience engagement and investment in the characters' lives and relationships.

== History ==
The structure and concept of a sitcom have roots in earlier forms of comedic theater, such as farces and comedy of manners. These forms relied on running gags to generate humor, but the term sitcom emerged as radio and TV adapted these principles into a new medium. The word was not commonly used until the 1950s.

Early television sitcoms were often filmed in front of a live studio audience using a multiple-camera setup, which has continued in some modern productions such as The Big Bang Theory and Fuller House. Other formats make use of a laugh track or "canned laughter"; however, this has tapered off. In 2016, only The Great Indoors, Kevin Can Wait, and Man with a Plan used them on broadcast television in the U.S.

Since the 1990s, sitcoms have expanded to animated sitcoms, with successful shows of the genre including The Simpsons, King of the Hill, and Family Guy.

Critics have debated the exact definition of a sitcom, mostly regarding productions created at the turn of the 21st century. Many contemporary American sitcoms use a single-camera setup and do not feature a laugh track, instead more resembling documentaries or the comedy-dramas of the 1980s and 1990s.

== By country ==
=== Australia ===
Although there have been few long-running Australian-made sitcoms, many American and British sitcoms have been successful in Australia, since sitcoms are considered a staple of the government broadcaster Australian Broadcasting Corporation (ABC). In the 1970s and 1980s many British sitcoms also screened on the Seven Network. By 1986, UK comedies Bless This House and Are You Being Served? had been re-screened several times by ABC Television; they were then acquired and screened by the Seven Network.

In 1981, Daily at Dawn was the first Australian comedy series to feature a regular gay character (Terry Bader as journalist Leslie).

In 1987, Mother and Son won the Television Drama Award for portraying a woman suffering from senile dementia and her interaction with her family, presented by the Australian Human Rights Commission.

In 2007, Kath & Kim's first episode of series 4 attracted an Australian audience of 2.521 million nationally. This was the highest rating for a first episode in the history of Australian television, until the series premiere of Underbelly: A Tale of Two Cities in 2009, which garnered 2.58 million viewers.

In 2013, Please Like Me received an invitation to screen at the Series Mania Television Festival in Paris, was praised by critics, and earned numerous awards and nominations.

Also in 2013, At Home with Julia was criticized by several social commentators as inappropriately disrespectful to the office of the Prime Minister. The show nevertheless proved very popular with both television audiences and critics, becoming the most-watched Australian scripted comedy series of 2011. It was nominated at the 2012 Australian Academy of Cinema and Television Arts Awards for Best Television Comedy Series.

=== Canada ===
Although there have been several notable exceptions, relatively few Canadian sitcoms attained notable success in Canada or internationally. Canadian television has had much greater success with sketch comedy and dramedy series.

The popular show King of Kensington aired from 1975 to 1980, at its peak garnering an average of 1.5 to 1.8 million viewers weekly.

The 1999 film Trailer Park Boys was followed up by a television series of the same name that ran from 2001 to 2018, airing in Canada, the U.S., and the U.K.

Corner Gas, which ran for six seasons from 2004 to 2009, became an instant hit, averaging one million viewers per episode. It has been the recipient of six Gemini Awards and has been nominated almost 70 times for various awards.

Other noteworthy recent sitcoms have included: Call Me Fitz, Schitt's Creek, Letterkenny, and Kim's Convenience, all of which have been winners of the Canadian Screen Award for Best Comedy Series.

In 2020, the sixth and final season of Schitt's Creek was nominated for 15 Primetime Emmy Awards. This broke the record for the most Emmy nominations given to a comedy series in its final season. During the 72nd Primetime Emmy Awards, the show became the first ever comedy or drama series to sweep the four acting categories (Outstanding Lead Actor, Outstanding Lead Actress, Outstanding Supporting Actor, Outstanding Supporting Actress for Eugene Levy, Catherine O'Hara, Dan Levy, and Annie Murphy respectively) and one of only four live action shows, along with All in the Family, The Golden Girls, and Will & Grace where all the principal actors have won at least one Emmy Award.

=== India ===
Sitcoms started appearing on Indian television in the 1980s, with serials such as Yeh Jo Hai Zindagi, Nukkad, and Wagle Ki Duniya on the state-run Doordarshan channel. Gradually, as private channels were permitted to operate, many more sitcoms followed. In the 1990s these included: Dekh Bhai Dekh, Zabaan Sambhalke, Shrimaan Shrimati, and in the 2000s, Office Office, Amrutham, Khichdi, Sarabhai vs Sarabhai, F.I.R., Taarak Mehta Ka Ooltah Chashmah, Uppum Mulakum, and Bhabiji Ghar Par Hain. SAB TV is one of the leading channels in India, dedicated entirely to sitcoms.

Taarak Mehta Ka Ooltah Chashmah is the longest-running sitcom of Indian television and is also known as the flagship show of SAB TV.

=== Iran ===
On Tiptoes and Shabhaye Barareh were among the first and most important sitcoms that led to the growth of this type of comedy in Iran, both receiving wide critical and audience acclaim.

=== Mexico ===
El Chavo del Ocho, which ran from 1971 to 1980, was the most-watched show on Mexican television and had a Latin-American audience of 350 million viewers per episode at its popularity peak during the mid-1970s. The show continues to be popular in Central America as well as in Colombia, Venezuela, Brazil, Spain, the United States, and other countries. Syndicated episodes average 91 million daily viewers in all its American markets. Since it ceased production in 1992, the show has earned an estimated $1 billion in syndication fees alone for Televisa.

=== New Zealand ===
Gliding On, a popular sitcom in New Zealand in the early 1980s, won multiple awards during its run including Best Comedy, Best Drama and Best Direction at the Feltex Awards.

=== Russia ===
The first Russian sitcom series was Strawberry, which resembled "Duty Pharmacy" in a Spanish format. It was aired from 1996 to 1997 on the RTR channel. The "boom" of Russian sitcoms began only in the 2000s, when in 2004, the STS started the highly successful sitcom My Fair Nanny (Russian: Моя прекрасная няня; an adaptation of the American sitcom "The Nanny"). Since that time, sitcoms in Russia have been produced by the two largest entertainment channels in the country – STS and TNT. In 2007, the STS released the first original domestic sitcom – Daddy's Daughters (Папины дочки; there were only adaptations before), and in 2010, TNT released Interns (Интерны) – the first sitcom, filmed as a comedy (unlike dominated "conveyor" sitcoms).

=== South Korea ===
Sitcoms (Korean: 시트콤) gained significant popularity in South Korea during the 1990s. This popularity was fueled by the success of shows such as Dr. Oh's People, LA Arirang, and Men and Women.

The use of computer graphics (CG) in sitcoms began to increase in the late 1990s as more broadcasters adopted CG technology. This led to more visually dynamic and creative sitcoms.

However, viewer preferences shifted towards dramas and thrillers in the 2010s, resulting in a decline in sitcom popularity. Nevertheless, there have been recent efforts to revive the sitcom genre. For instance, Netflix released So Not Worth It in 2021, featuring many creators from popular South Korean sitcoms.

Popular South Korean sitcoms include the High Kick series, which has spawned several spin-offs.

=== United Kingdom ===
British sitcoms, like their American counterparts, often revolve around a core group of characters who interact in a recurring setting, such as a family, workplace, or institution. However, British sitcoms typically consist of shorter series, often six episodes, and are frequently developed by a smaller writing team.

The majority of British sitcoms are half-hour comedies recorded in studio settings using a multiple-camera setup. While many adhere to traditional sitcom conventions, some have ventured into more unconventional territory. For example Yes Minister/Yes, Prime Minister shifted the focus from domestic or workplace settings to the world of politics.

A more recent development in British comedy is the mockumentary, a style that blends documentary and comedic elements. Shows such as The Office, Come Fly with Me, W1A, People Just Do Nothing, and This Country have successfully employed this format to explore a variety of topics and characters.

=== United States ===
Sitcoms, or situation comedies, made their debut in the United States in 1926 with the radio show Sam 'n' Henry. The subsequent success of Amos 'n' Andy, also created by Freeman Gosden and Charles Correll, solidified the sitcom's place in American radio programming.

The transition to television brought about significant changes in the sitcom format. Mary Kay and Johnny, which premiered in 1947, became the first American television sitcom. Today, American sitcoms typically run for 22 minutes, allowing for approximately eight minutes of advertising within a 30-minute time slot.

Throughout their history, American sitcoms have often drawn inspiration from British counterparts. Popular shows such as All in the Family, Three's Company, and Sanford and Son were adapted from successful British series. More recently, The Office achieved significant popularity in the United States, following the success of its British counterpart.

The large influence of the cinema of the United States has also allowed it to influence the world, with I Love Lucy, Bewitched, The Beverly Hillbillies, The Mary Tyler Moore Show, Gilligan's Island, Friends, and Seinfeld continuing to hold an influence on the format. The United States also features the largest animated sitcoms, including The Flintstones, The Jetsons, The Simpsons, King of the Hill, Daria, South Park, and Family Guy. Sitcoms have had such a profound impact on American television entertainment that aspects of it even appear in other broadcasting formats; including the radio and television comedy series The Jack Benny Program, Western series Gunsmoke, war comedy drama M*A*S*H, fantasy horror series Supernatural, contemporary Western crime media franchise Breaking Bad, and reality television show Duck Dynasty.

Numerous television networks in the United States feature sitcoms in their programming. CBS, Warner Bros. TBS, Nickelodeon, and Disney Channel are just a few examples, however many of them are beginning to move to digital formats.

== See also ==
- Animated sitcom
- Black sitcom
- List of sitcoms
- Sitcoms in the United States
