= Calvin and the Colonel =

Animated television series

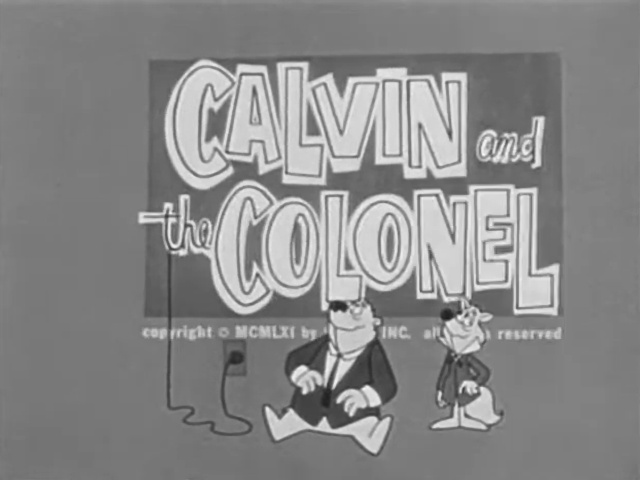
- Genre: Adult animation Sitcom
- Created by: Freeman F. Gosden; Charles J. Correll
- Starring: Freeman Gosden; Charles Correll; Beatrice Kay; Virginia Gregg; Paul Frees
- Theme music composer: George Bruns
- Composer: George Bruns
- Country of origin: United States
- No. of seasons: 1
- No. of episodes: 26

Production
- Producers: Joe Connelly; Bob Mosher
- Running time: approx. 30 minutes (per episode)
- Production companies: Creston Studios; Kayro Productions

Original release
- Network: ABC
- Release: October 3, 1961 – June 9, 1962

Calvin and the Colonel is an American animated sitcom about Colonel Montgomery J. Klaxon, a shrewd fox, and Calvin T. Burnside, a dumb bear. Their lawyer was Oliver Wendell Clutch, who was a (literal) weasel. The colonel lived with his wife Maggie Belle and her sister Susan Culpepper, who did not trust the Colonel at all. Colonel Klaxon was in the real estate business, but always tried get-rich-quick schemes with Calvin's unwitting help.

== Series overview ==
The series was an animated remake of Amos 'n' Andy [or, more or less, "Andy and The Kingfish"] and featured the voices of Freeman Gosden and Charles Correll from the radio series (in fact, several of the original radio scripts by Joe Connelly & Bob Mosher were adapted for this series). Using animals avoided the touchy racial issues that had led to the downfall of Amos 'n' Andy.

Because of low ratings, the show was cancelled after two months, but returned two months later on Saturday evenings to complete the first season contract (and to fulfill Lever Brothers' agreement to sponsor the program; they originally sponsored The Amos 'n' Andy Show on radio during the 1940s). For a year afterward reruns were seen on Saturday mornings, and eventually syndicated through the 1960s. It was also adapted as a comic book by Dell Comics, and as such the first of two issues was the final installment in the company's extremely prolific (more than 1,300 issues published) Four Color anthology series. Despite its low ratings in America, the series gained popularity in Australia during its initial run, with reruns airing on Channel 7 up to the late 1980s.

A brief sequence from the show was seen on a television set in a 1966 episode of The Munsters ("A Visit From Johann"), which was also produced by Connelly and Mosher.

Much like other animated sitcom programs of the time (The Flintstones, Top Cat and The Jetsons), the series had a laugh track in the episodes.

== Credits ==
- Created by Freeman Gosden, Charles Correll
- Voices: Freeman Gosden, Charles Correll, Beatrice Kay, Virginia Gregg, Paul Frees
- Music: George Bruns
- Animation Producers [Creston Studios]: Bob Ganon, Sam Nicholson, Gerald Ray
- Art Director: Norm Gottfredson
- Animation Directors: Chuck McKimson, John Walker
- Supervising Animators: Tom McDonald, John Sparey, Bob Bemiller
- Production Coordinator: Dave Hoffman
- Editing: Norm Vizents
- Sound: Phil Kaye
- Recording Director: Cliff Howell
- Production Executive: Al Amatuzio
- Produced by Joe Connelly and Bob Mosher

== Episodes ==
No.	Title	Written by	Original release date
1	"The Television Job"	Joe Connelly, Bob Mosher	October 3, 1961
Calvin and the Colonel get a job picking up television sets and delivering them to the repairman. Things go wrong when they pick up a wrong television set and break it.
2	"The Polka Dot Bandit"	Joe Connelly, Bob Mosher	October 10, 1961
The Colonel suspects that his sister-in-law is a jewel thief.
3	"Thanksgiving Dinner"	Joe Connelly, Bob Mosher	October 17, 1961
The Colonel has to find Thanksgiving food for his relatives he carelessly invited one year ago.
4	"The Costume Ball"	Joe Connelly, Bob Mosher	October 24, 1961
Maggie Belle kicks the Colonel out and winds up at Calvin's place. He gets invited to a costume ball, unaware that Maggie Belle is also there.
5	"Sycamore Lodge"	Joe Connelly, Bob Mosher	October 31, 1961
The mountain cabin that the Colonel has rented turns out to be flooded. Unable to get a refund, the Colonel rents the cabin to Calvin.
6	"Money in the Closet"	Joe Connelly, Bob Mosher	November 7, 1961
Needing to replace all the money that the Colonel spent, he convinces Calvin that he's a movie star material.
7	"Calvin Gets Psychoanalyzed"	Unknown	January 27, 1962
Calvin visits a psychiatrist so he can have a better understanding of why his girlfriend, Georgianna, dropped him.
8	"Wheeling and Dealing"	T. Hee	February 3, 1962
After breaking his nephew's car, the Colonel tries to get insurance on it.
9	"The Wrecking Crew"	Bob Ross	February 10, 1962
The Colonel takes a job as a construction worker. He then learns of a way to make even more money ... by injuring himself on the job site and collecting insurance payments.
10	"The Colonel's Old Flame"	Joe Connelly, Bob Mosher	February 17, 1962
Several years ago, the Colonel promised his then-sweetheart, Boo Boo Winters, that he'd marry her. But instead of Boo Boo, he married Maggie Belle. Now Boo Boo unexpectedly returns, demanding that the Colonel live up to his promise.
11	"Sister Sue and the Police Captain"	Unknown	February 24, 1962
It looks like marriage for Sister Sue and a police captain until the Colonel wrecks the captain's car.
12	"Jim Dandy Cleaners"	Unknown	March 3, 1962
At her place of work, Maggie Belle is given the task of having the typewriters sent out to be cleaned. But when she becomes ill, her husband the Colonel takes over the project.
13	"Jealousy"	Unknown	March 10, 1962
Tossed out by his wife, the Colonel concludes another man has entered her life.
14	"Cloakroom"	Joe Connelly, Bob Mosher	March 17, 1962
Calvin and the Colonel starts a cloakroom business at the night club. Things go wrong when they lose one of the coats.
15	"Sister Sue's Sweetheart"	Joe Connelly, Bob Mosher	March 24, 1962
The Colonel tries to stop Sister Sue's wedding after finding out that the $300-a-month from her deceased husband's estate will be cut off.
16	"The Winning Number"	Unknown	March 31, 1962
The Colonel hopes to win the Lucky Buck contest but Calvin has the winning dollar bill.
17	"Calvin's Glamour Girl"	Unknown	April 7, 1962
Calvin tries to fool his girlfriend's mother into believing that he's wealthy.
18	"Colonel Out-Foxes Himself"	Unknown	April 14, 1962
Leaving the Colonel money to pay the rent, Maggie Belle and Sister Sue head for Nashville to visit relatives.
19	"Nephew Newton's Fortune"	Bob Ross	April 21, 1962
The Colonel finds out that his visiting nephew Newton owns a stock worth thousands of dollars.
20	"Calvin's Tax Problem"	Joe Connelly, Bob Mosher	April 28, 1962
Needing money to reclaim his repossessed furniture, the Colonel becomes a tax consultant when Calvin needs help with his income tax return.
21	"Women's Club Picnic"	Unknown	May 5, 1962
Maggie Belle entrusts the Colonel with money that her club is planning to use for their picnic.
22	"Magazine Romance"	Unknown	May 12, 1962
The Colonel takes Maggie Belle to a nightclub after she accuses him of being unromantic.
23	"Ring Reward"	Unknown	May 19, 1962
The Colonel discovers that the faux diamond ring that Calvin bought is actually the real thing...and stolen.
24	"The Carnappers"	Unknown	May 26, 1962
The Colonel is delighted after his car gets stolen and can collect insurance money.
25	"Colonel Traps a Thief"	Unknown	June 2, 1962
Calvin and the Colonel decide to try to stop a thief that's been breaking and entering his apartment.
26	"Back to Nashville"	Unknown	June 9, 1962
The Colonel, Maggie Belle and Sister Sue are planning to visit Uncle Selby in Nashville. The Colonel is looking for a way to save money, so he invites Calvin along in hopes that he'll share in the cost of the trip.
