= Swan Soap =

Brand of soap introduced by the Lever Brothers Company

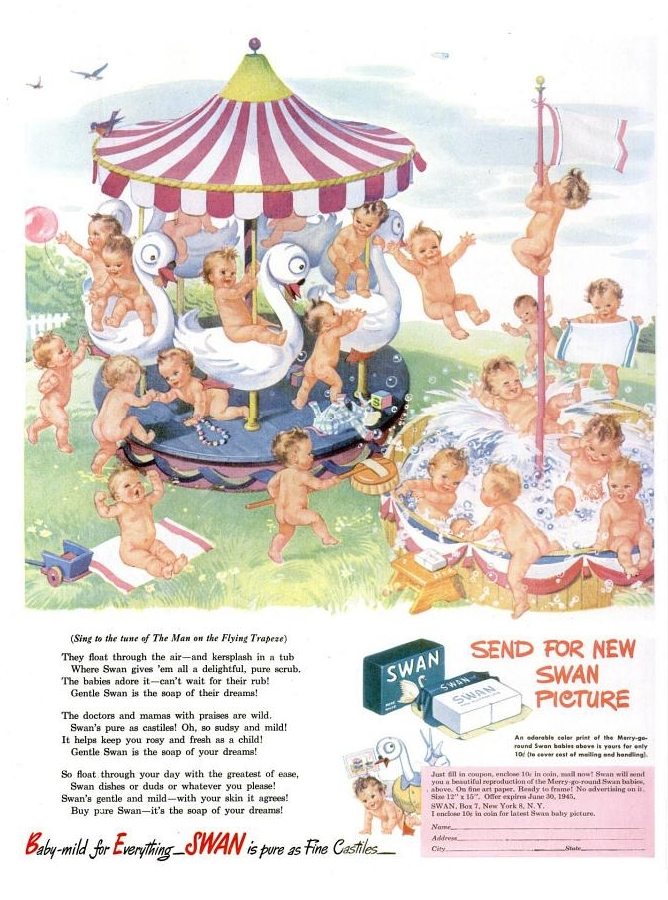
Swan soap ad from March, 1945

Swan was a brand of soap introduced by the Lever Brothers Company in the United States in 1941 to compete with Ivory.

== Description ==
Swan, like Ivory, was a floating soap. Still, Lever had developed and patented a new manufacturing method that streamlined the process and resulted in a finer product, more like milled soap.

Swan Soap is no longer marketed.

== Advertising ==
Lever Brothers used the Swan brand name to sponsor several radio programs, notably The George Burns and Gracie Allen Show (1941–1945), Joanie's Tea Room (1945–1947), The Bob Hope Show (1948–1950), and My Friend Irma (1947–1951).

Swan was advertised as a hand soap used in the kitchen or the bathroom to bathe the baby. A typical advertisement boasted that it was "the white floating soap that's purer than the finest castiles".

Swan's print ads were colorful works of art that often featured children, babies, soapsuds, and, of course, a swan. Some people displayed the Swan soap ad prints on their walls at home. The company made the art prints available to the public as promotional items.

== Lawsuits ==
Lever and Procter & Gamble became embroiled in litigation over the process, and Lever sued Procter & Gamble for patent infringement after the format of Ivory changed; the appellate court found that the patent had been infringed and Procter & Gamble were required to pay $5.675 million to Lever.

In 1972, Gladys Young sued the manufacturer of Swan liquid dishwashing detergent, Lever Brothers, and the manufacturer's insurer for damages because of skin irritation allegedly caused by her use of the product between 1968 and 1970. She testified that a week or two after she started using Swan, the detergent dried out her fingers, and they began to itch around the nails. When her nails began to recede within two or three months, Mrs. Young reflected upon the cause and theorized that the change to Swan could have been responsible for the condition. The district court dismissed her suit after a trial on the merits on September 26, 1973. However, publicity from the trial hurt sales, and Swan Detergent was discontinued by 1974.
