= Skinnay Ennis =

American jazz and pop bandleader and singer (1907–1963)

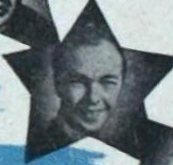
- Ennis in a 1945 advertisement
- Born: Edgar Clyde Ennis Jr. August 13, 1907; Salisbury, North Carolina, U.S.
- Died: June 3, 1963 (aged 55); Beverly Hills, California, U.S.
- Other names: Skinnay Ennis and His Orchestra
- Education: University of North Carolina
- Occupation: Bandleader
- Spouse: Carmene Calhoun (1939–1959, divorce)
- Children: 1

Edgar Clyde "Skinnay" Ennis Jr. (August 13, 1907 – June 3, 1963) was an American jazz and pop music bandleader and singer.

== Early years ==
The son of Mr. and Mrs. E.C. Ennis, he was born Edgar Clyde Ennis Jr. in Salisbury, North Carolina, United States, and had a brother, James W. Ennis. He met Hal Kemp while attending the University of North Carolina - Chapel Hill. The two were members of Delta Sigma Phi fraternity there.

== Orchestras ==
An obituary reported about Ennis and his orchestra, "His band had performed in every major dance palace in the nation."

Ennis joined Kemp's orchestra as a drummer and vocalist in the late 1920s, playing with him through 1938, including one tour of Europe in 1930.

In 1938, Ennis put together his own band, which became a popular ensemble in Hollywood films. "Got a Date With an Angel" was his theme song. During this time Gil Evans was one of his arrangers.

Toward the end of the 1950s Ennis's career had faded, and he worked mostly in hotels in the Los Angeles area.

== Film ==
Ennis and his orchestra starred in the short 1941 film Once Upon a Summertime and the film College Swing. as well as in Blondie Meets The Boss in 1939. His first film appearance was in the short film, Eddie Peabody and his College Chums (1929), followed by "No Other One" (1936) featuring Hal Kemp and his orchestra, which was an entry in Max Fleischer's Bouncing Ball Screen Songs series.

== Radio ==
Ennis began performing comedy routines, and in 1938 he landed a job as bandleader on Bob Hope's radio program, appearing as a regular until he entered the Army.

He returned to Hollywood bandleading at the war's end and joined the Abbott and Costello radio program during the 1946–47 season.

== Military service ==
Ennis joined the Army in 1943, serving as a "warrant officer in charge of a 28-piece band" during World War II.

== Personal life ==
Ennis was married to the former singer Carmene Calhoun for 20 years, and they had one son. The couple divorced in 1959.

Ennis, whose nickname originally was "Skinny," changed it to "Skinnay", after it was misspelled that way on the label of a record early in his career.

== Death ==
Ennis choked to death on a bone while eating dinner at a restaurant in Beverly Hills in 1963.

== Other sources ==
- Bob Conrad, Hal Kemp historian
- Certificate of Birth, from the "Office of Register of Deeds", Salisbury, N.C.
