= Gleem =

Brand of oral hygiene products

- Product type: Oral hygiene
- Current owner: Procter & Gamble
- Country: United States
- Introduced: 1952; 74 years ago
- Markets: United States

Gleem is an American brand of oral hygiene products, including toothpastes and electric toothbrushes, owned by Procter & Gamble. It was introduced as a toothpaste in the United States in 1952 and discontinued in 2014. Procter & Gamble later revived Gleem toothpaste as a flavor variant of Crest toothpaste (Crest Fresh and White Fluoride, Peppermint Gleem toothpaste). In 2019, Procter & Gamble expanded the brand to include a line of electric toothbrushes.

== Marketing ==
An advertisement for Gleem toothpaste, featuring GL-70, from Time magazine's March 31, 1958, issue

Gleem was positioned in 1952 as a competitor to top Colgate's then top Dental Cream, with advertising coordinated by Compton Advertising, Inc. The League Against Obnoxious TV Commercials included a Gleem toothpaste commercial in its list of the terrible 10 in May 1963. In 1958 Gleem had become number two in top toothpastes, with Colgate still first in sales and Crest in third place. By 1969, Gleem was a declining brand name. In an effort to obtain additional sales, Procter & Gamble assigned the account to the firm of Mary Wells Lawrence, Wells, Rich, Greene.

Advertisements in the 1950s stated that it contained GL-70, an "odor- and bacteria-fighting compound". When Gleem II with fluoride and "green sparkles" was introduced within several years, the brand achieved a 9% share of the toothpaste market. However, this portion declined to around 6% with the introduction of new competing brands. Gleem's main decline was promotion geared toward its take-over competitor, Crest. The difference between Gleem and Crest is Gleem was strictly a "toothpaste" and originally contained no fluoride. Fluoride was later introduced into Gleem after Crest was first sold in 1955, as a form of consumer competition. While Gleem remained a toothpaste, Crest advanced into flavored "pastes", "gels", and so on. Until its discontinuance, the Gleem toothpaste package stated "Contains No Sugar" in bold print. Crest has been known to carry increments of sugar as well as artificial flavoring and coloring, aimed at coaxing young children and preteen enticement to prompt oral hygiene. In 1963, Gleem carried a 17-percent share of the toothpaste market in third place, with an advertising budget at $7.1 million. Gleem continued to become less prevalent when the American Dental Association granted Crest approval for the ADA logo. In addition, Crest contains stannous fluoride which has been said to strengthen and protect tooth enamel, calcium and fight gingivitis and bacterial infection, but is often irritant, abrasive and stains, while sodium fluoride (contained in Gleem) is more gentle, does not stain, but requires more application (longer or more brushings) to further prevent bacterial infections and can have little effect with calcium.

In 1975, Gleem was supported by $6 million in television advertising alone. In August 1976, Procter & Gamble transferred Gleem from Wells, Rich, Greene to the Leo Burnett Company of Chicago, Illinois.

== See also ==
- List of toothpaste brands
- Index of oral health and dental articles
- List of defunct consumer brands
