= Sam 'n' Henry =

1920's WGN Chicago radio series

Sam 'n' Henry was a radio series performed by Freeman Gosden and Charles Correll that aired on Chicago radio station WGN from 1926 through 1928. The ten-minute program is often considered the first situation comedy. Gosden and Correll reworked the premise on a more ambitious scale to create their long-running radio show Amos 'n' Andy.

== Characters and history ==

In late 1925, radio performers Gosden and Correll had been approached about doing a show based on Sidney Smith's popular comic strip The Gumps. Gosden and Corell instead proposed their own radio serial using characters they created themselves. Like The Gumps, each show would be amusing in itself but would also feature recurring characters in an ongoing storyline.

Gosden and Correll decided to make their main characters, named Sam Smith and Henry Johnson, Black men who had recently arrived from Alabama during the Great Migration. This reflected the historical circumstances in Chicago during the 1920s, when millions of Southern Black families moved north in search of opportunity and relief from Jim Crow segregation in the South. This influx was met with considerable resistance in Northern communities, including Chicago, leading to numerous forms of marginalization for the new arrivals; one expression of this was the often mocking, stereotypical portrayal of African Americans by White performers, a tradition of which Gosden and Correll became prominent examples.

After overcoming initial problems with finding food, living space and employment, Sam and Henry set up their own moving company, with overbearing Henry as company president and meek, gullible Sam as the one who does all the work. Having been initiated into a colored fraternity called the Jewels of the Crown, they strike up a friendship with the Most Precious Diamond, the high officer of the lodge, who frequently tries to get his hands on the boys' money.

Sam 'n' Henry premiered on Chicago radio station WGN on January 12, 1926, and immediately found an audience of Midwestern listeners. Correll and Gosden wrote and produced 586 episodes. They provided the voices for all characters.

Gosden and Corell left WGN after the station rejected their novel concept of recording Sam 'n' Henry on phonograph records for distribution to other radio stations. The duo's last musical program for WGN was broadcast on January 29, 1928. In March, they brought their characters, now called Amos and Andy, to competing Chicago station WMAQ. WGN retained the rights to the characters and continued Sam 'n' Henry without Correll and Gosden until February 12, 1928. On March 31, some two weeks after Amos 'n' Andy premiered on WMAQ, Sam 'n' Henry returned as a 15- to 30-minute program, in which the title characters mostly functioned as announcers for musical performances. The final episode of Sam 'n' Henry aired on July 14, 1928.

Today, the show is acknowledged as a historically significant production, but one that also effected real harm through the perpetuation of racial stereotypes, minstrelsy, and blackface performance.

== Books ==
In 1926, the Chicago Tribune published Sam 'n' Henry, containing a selection of 25 of the scripts Correll and Gosden wrote for the first two months of their radio series (judging from the pages of the Chicago Tribune quoted in chapter 23, these are from among the 31 episodes broadcast up to February 19, 1926). In the brief introduction, they wrote, "Please stand by while we rise (both of us) and bow fervently to our good and great papa, the Chicago Tribune. Oh, oh!" Illustrator Samuel Jay Smith supplied several drawings of the characters. Since the book sold well in the Midwest, the Tribune brought out a paperback version in 1930.

== Other media ==
From February 6, 1927, to October 2, 1927, each Sunday issue of the Chicago Daily Tribune contained the script of an old or recent episode of the show. In 1926 and 1927, Gosden and Correll also recorded some of their Sam 'n' Henry routines for Victor Records (rewritten and shortened to about three minutes), and in the first two months of 1927, they performed as Sam 'n' Henry in at least three Chicago theaters.

== Listen to ==
- Tom Heathwood interviews broadcast historian Elizabeth McLeod
- "Sam 'n Henry (aka Amos & Andy) 14 Eps", Old Time Radio, Audio Archive.
