= Freeman Gosden =

American radio comedian and actor (1899–1982)

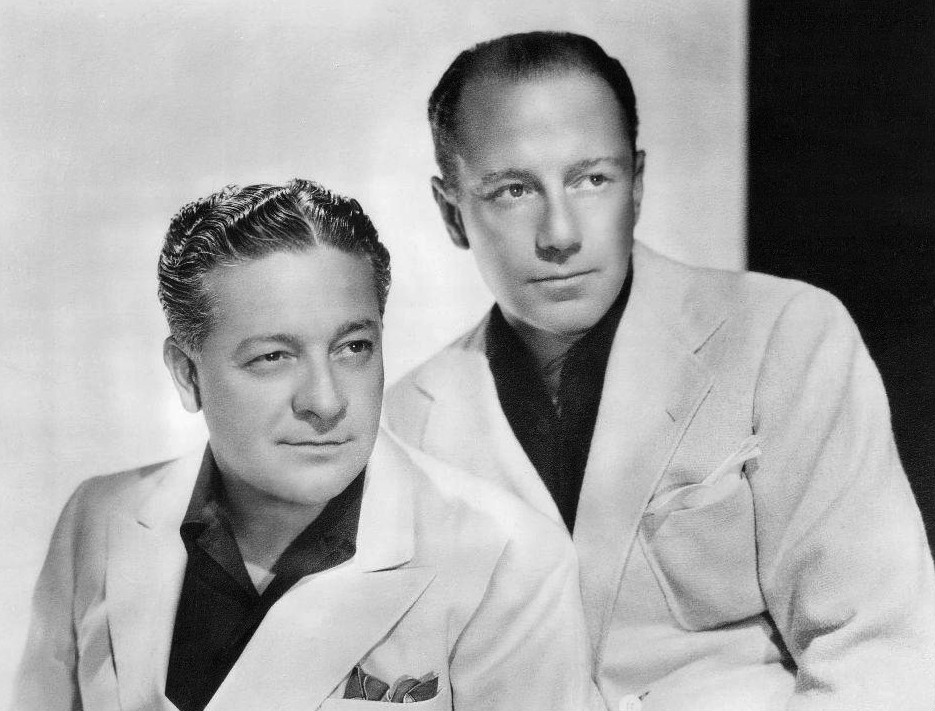
- Freeman Gosden at right with Charles Correll, 1939.
- Born: Freeman Fisher Gosden; May 5, 1899; Richmond, Virginia, U.S.
- Died: December 10, 1982 (aged 83); Los Angeles, California, U.S.
- Occupations: Radio comedian; actor; pioneer
- Years active: 1921–1962
- Known for: Amos of Amos 'n' Andy
- Spouse(s): Leta Gosden (m. 1927; div. 1940) Jane Stoneham (m. 1944; died 1982)
- Children: 4

Freeman Fisher "Gozzie" Gosden (May 5, 1899 – December 10, 1982) was an American radio comedian, actor and pioneer in the development of the situation comedy form. He is best known for his work in the Amos 'n' Andy radio series.

== Life and career ==
Gosden was born in Richmond, Virginia, the son of Emma L. (Smith) and Walter W. Gosden Sr. While attending school in Richmond, Gozzie worked part-time in Tarrant's Drug Store at 1 West Broad Street. During World War I, he served in the U.S. Navy as a wireless operator, which prompted his great interest in the young medium of radio.

During 1921, Gosden first teamed with Charles Correll to do radio work, presenting comedy acts and hosting variety programs. They had met in Durham, North Carolina, both working for the Joe Bren Producing Company. Their first regular series bagan in 1925 with their WEBH Chicago program, Correll and Gosden, the Life of the Party. For this program, the two told jokes, sang, and played music (Correll played piano and Gosden ukulele or banjo).

In 1926, Gosden and Correll, who were both white, had success with their radio program, Sam 'n' Henry, in which the two actors portrayed black characters. The show originated on Chicago radio station WGN.

From 1928 to 1960, Gosden and Correll, broadcast their program, Amos 'n' Andy – again portraying black characters – which quickly became one of the most famous and popular radio series of the 1930s, nationwide. Gosden voiced the characters "Amos Jones", "George 'Kingfish' Stevens", "Lightning", "Brother Crawford", and some dozen other characters. To celebrate the show's 30th anniversary, the broadcast of March 19, 1958, was done by Correll and Gosden using their real voices and calling each other by their real names; this had never been done for the program before.

During 1961–1962, Gosden and Correll provided the voices for the animated television series Calvin and the Colonel broadcast by American Broadcasting Company-TV.

In 1969, Gosden was honored with a star on the Hollywood Walk of Fame for his work in radio. In 1974, Gosden was living in Palm Springs, California and, in 1976, he was the best man for Frank Sinatra's wedding to Barbara Marx. In 1977, Gosden was inducted into the National Association of Broadcasters Hall of Fame along with Correll.

== Personal life ==
Gosden was the father of four children: Virginia, Craig, Freeman Jr., and Linda.

Gosden was a charter member of the Augusta National Golf Club, joining the club at its inception in 1932. He was a long-term good friend of Clifford Roberts's, who, along with famed golfer Bob Jones, co-founded the club. He was a Freemason at Petersburg Lodge No. 15 in Virginia.

Gosden died from congestive heart failure in Los Angeles, California on December 10, 1982, at the age of 83.
