= Charles Correll =

American comedian, actor and writer (1890–1972)

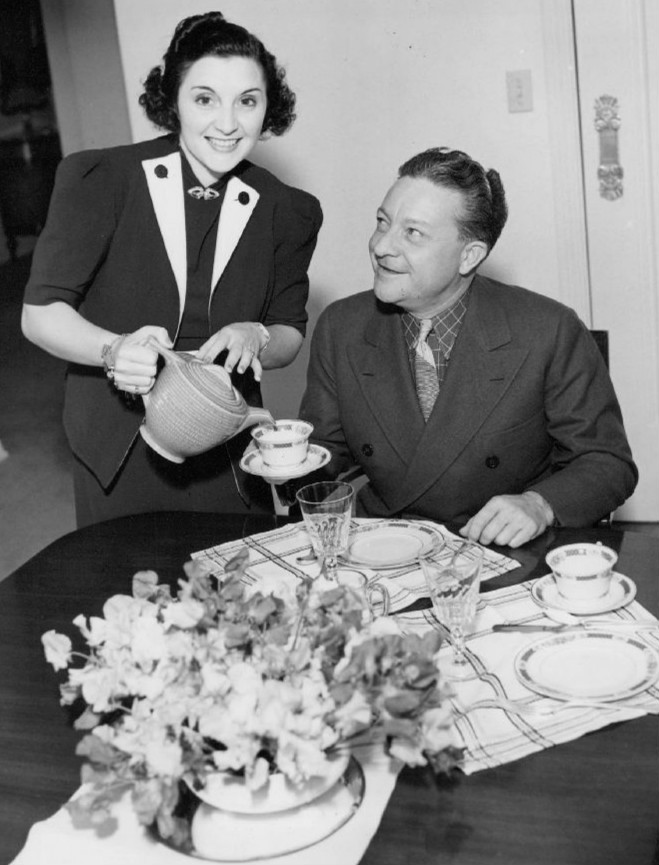
- Correll and his wife, Alyce, 1937
- Born: Charles James Correll; February 2, 1890; Peoria, Illinois, U.S.
- Died: September 26, 1972 (aged 82); Chicago, Illinois, U.S.
- Occupations: Radio comedian; actor; writer
- Years active: 1921–1962
- Known for: Andy of Amos 'n' Andy
- Spouses: Marie Janes (m. 1927; div. 1937) Alyce McLaughlin (m. 1937; died 1972)
- Children: 6; Including Charles Jr. and Rich

Charles James Correll (February 2, 1890 – September 26, 1972) was an American radio comedian, actor and writer who was best known for his work in the radio Amos 'n' Andy radio series with Freeman Gosden. Correll voiced the main character, Andy Brown, along with various lesser characters.

== Biography ==
=== Life and career ===
Correll was born in Peoria, Illinois. He worked originally as a stenographer and a bricklayer. He met Gosden in Durham, North Carolina while working for the Joe Bren Producing Company.

In 1926, Gosden and Correll, who were both white, had success with their radio program, Sam 'n' Henry, in which the two actors portray black characters. The show originated on Chicago radio station WGN.

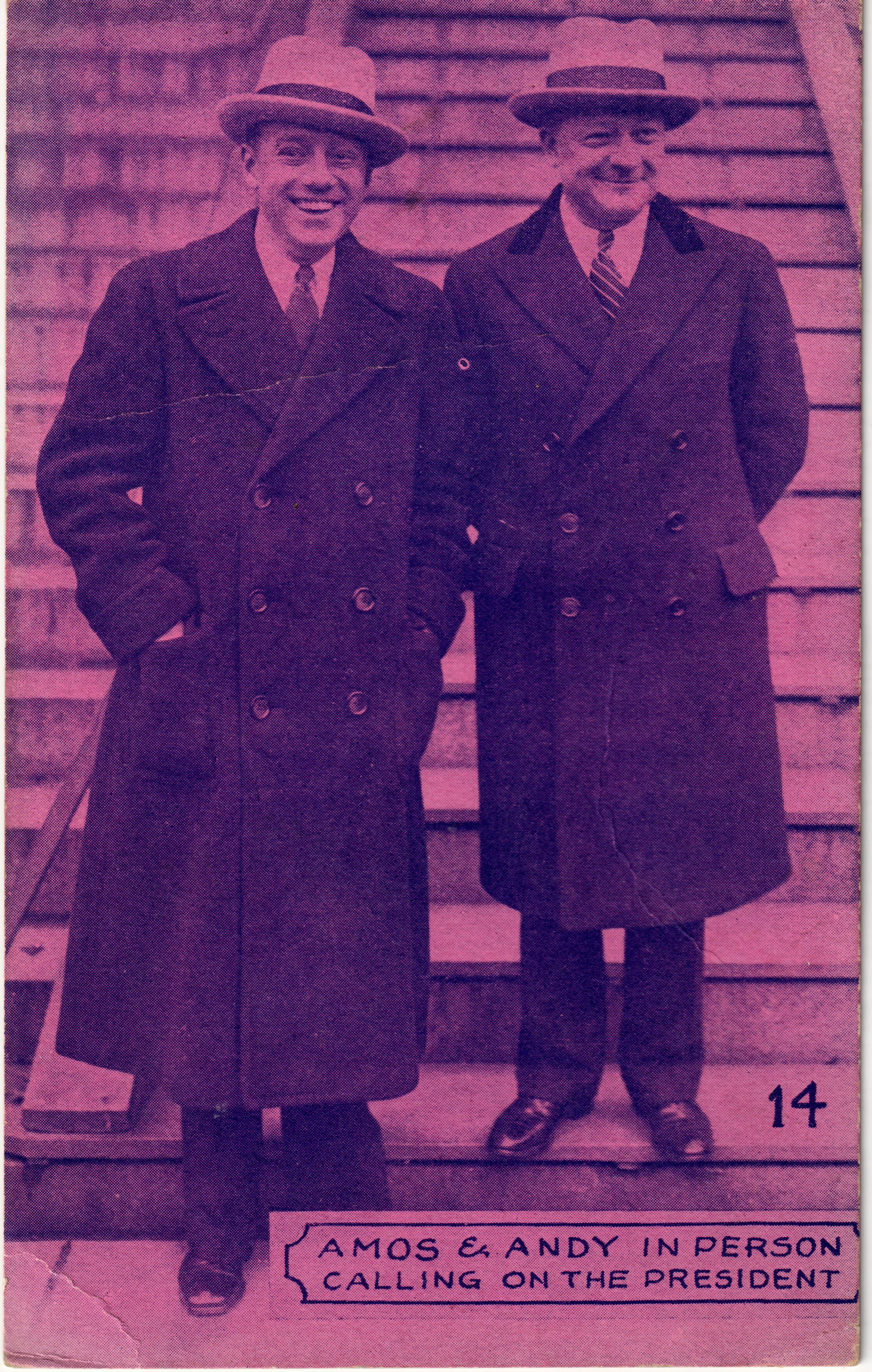
Puublicity postcard of Freeman Gosden and Charles Correll as Amos 'n' Andy

From 1928 to 1960, Gosden and Correll broadcast their Amos 'n' Andy radio program — again portraying black characters – which quickly became one of the most famous and popular radio series of the 1930s nationwide. Correll voiced the character "Andy" (Andrew Hogg Brown). To celebrate the show's 30th anniversary, the broadcast of March 19, 1958, was done by Correll and Gosden using their real voices and calling each other by their real names; this had never been done for the program before.

During 1961–1962, Gosden and Correll provided the voices for the animated series Calvin and the Colonel for American Broadcasting Company-TV.

=== Last years ===
Correll died in 1972 in a Chicago hospital after a heart attack. At the time of his death, he was retired and living in Beverly Hills, California, just a few blocks away from his radio partner, Freeman Gosden.

=== Personal life and family ===
Correll's first marriage to Marie Janes ended with divorce on May 26, 1937; the couple had been married for ten years and did not have any children. On September 11, 1937, in Glendale, California, he married Alyce McLaughlin, a former dancer; they had six children, Dorothy, Charles, Barbara, John, Richard, and a baby girl who died in 1939 when she was less than a day old. On July 5, 1954, John Correll, his seven-year-old son, died of what seemed to be an accidental poisoning. An autopsy determined the young boy died of an acute kidney infection.

His son, Charles Correll Jr., became an actor and a director. Another son, Richard Correll, also became an actor, and was best remembered as the "Richard Rickover" character on Leave It to Beaver; he also produced and directed the television situation comedy Family Matters.

Correll was a Freemason.

=== Political views ===
Correll supported Barry Goldwater in the 1964 United States presidential election.

== Legacy ==
The comedy team was named to the Radio Hall of Fame in 1962. In 1969, Correll was memorialized with a star on the Hollywood Walk of Fame for his radio work. In 1977, Correll was inducted in the National Association of Broadcasters Hall of Fame along with Gosden.
