= Ghost train (disambiguation) =

A ghost train is a phantom in the form of a train.

Ghost train may also refer to:

== Trains ==
- Ghost train, or parliamentary train, a service run rarely to maintain the legal fiction that a station or line remains open
- Belgian ghost train, a train which transported political prisoners from Brussels to France during the German invasion of Belgium in 1940
- Nazi ghost train, a train which intended to transport political prisoners from Brussels to concentration camps in Germany

== Amusement rides ==
- Ghost train (ride), or dark ride, an indoor amusement ride
- Halloween special theme trains at North Norfolk Railway
- Ghost Train (Blackpool Pleasure Beach), an amusement ride in Blackpool, Lancashire, England
- 1979 Sydney Ghost Train fire, a fire at Luna Park Sydney

== Books ==
- Ghost Train (book), a picture book by Paul Yee
- The Ghost Train (play), written in 1923 by Arnold Ridley

== Film and television ==
- Ghost Train (1927 film), starring Guy Newall
- The Ghost Train (1931 film), starring Jack Hulbert
- The Ghost Train (1933 film), a Hungarian version starring Marika Rökk
- The Ghost Train (1933 Romanian film), starring Lisette Verea
- The Ghost Train (1937 film), starring Hugh Dempster
- The Ghost Train (1941 film), starring Arthur Askey
- Ghost Train (2006 film), Japanese horror film
- Ghost Train, 2013 short film by Irish director Lee Cronin, featured in the horror anthology Minutes Past Midnight (2016)
- Ghost Train (2025 film), South Korean mystery horror film
- Ghost Train (TV series), broadcast between 1989 and 1991
- "Ghost Train", 1985 episode of Amazing Stories (1985 TV series), directed by Steven Spielberg
- "Ghost Train", 1986 episode of Thomas and Friends (series 2)
- Ghost Train (audio story 2011) Torchwood TV Series

== Music ==
- Ghost Train, an album by The Hot Club of Cowtown

=== Songs ===
- "Ghost Train", a concert band composition by Eric Whitacre
- "Ghost Train", from the 2019 EP Lost Souls EP by Knife Party
- "Ghost Train", from the 2012 album Pop Tune by Shonen Knife
- "Ghost Train", from the 1985 self-titled album by Feargal Sharkey
- "Ghost Train", from the 1992 album Delusions of Banjer by Bad Livers
- "Ghost Train", from the 1993 album August and Everything After by Counting Crows
- "Ghost Train", B-side of "Rock the House" by Gorillaz
- "Ghost Train", from the 1992 album Still Life with Guitar by Kevin Ayers
- "Ghost Train", from the 1991 album Marc Cohn by Marc Cohn
- "Ghost Train", from the 1986 album Dreamtime by The Stranglers
- "(Waiting For) The Ghost Train", by Madness
- "Ghost Train", the B-side of "New Amsterdam", from the 1980 compilation album Taking Liberties by Elvis Costello
- "Ghost Train", from the 1981 single Ghost Train by Bruce Woolley

== Other ==
- Ghost train, a storm chasers' term for the rear-inflow jet of a tornado, a term coined by Skip Talbot in 2013

== See also ==
- Death train (disambiguation)
- Haunted Train (disambiguation)
- Phantom train (disambiguation)
