= Deputy Seraph =

- Starring: Groucho Marx; Chico Marx; Harpo Marx
- Country of origin: United Kingdom
- Original language: English
- No. of episodes: 1 (unfinished pilot)

Production
- Running time: 15 minutes

Deputy Seraph was an unfinished pilot for a television series in 1959 featuring the Marx Brothers: Groucho, Chico, and Harpo. The title was a pun on seraph (an angelic being) and sheriff, reflecting the Western shows that were popular on TV at the time.

== Background ==
By 1959, the Marx Brothers were still popular but, in their sixties and seventies, were considered too old to make films or a regular television series. They hadn't appeared together in a decade, since their final film Love Happy in 1949.

On March 8, 1959, Chico and Harpo starred together in an episode of General Electric Theater called "The Incredible Jewel Robbery". The brothers played Harry and Nick, two inept robbers who try to pull a jewelry heist wearing Groucho Marx disguises. When they are caught and placed in a police lineup, the real Groucho shows up and is immediately fingered as the thief. Groucho delivers the only line in the otherwise silent program: "We won't talk until we see our lawyer!"

== Pilot ==
Encouraged by the audience reaction, in April the brothers began filming a pilot for Deputy Seraph, a proposed weekly TV series in which Chico and Harpo were angels whose job was to possess people for brief periods of time: bringing two lovers together, exposing a criminal, and so forth. Groucho was cast as a "Deputy Seraph" who would appear in approximately every third show to help undo some of the pandemonium created by his brothers. He would contact "the man upstairs" via telephone: saying, "Phone, please!," would cause a telephone handset to magically appear in his hand. ("I must find out how they do that," Groucho marveled). Phillip Rapp, a lifelong Marx Brothers fan, came up with the concept and served as the show's producer.

The pilot story involved a triangle between a young composer, the niece of a compulsive gambler/concert pianist and a sleazy casino owner. A psychiatrist attributes the pianist's strange habit of shooting the piano keys and speaking in an impossible Italian accent to various childhood traumas (these predilections, of course, were Chico trademarks). In the end, the girl and boy get together and the villain gets his comeuppance.

Since the Marxes only had to film a fraction of each episode (with other actors/characters impersonating them for most of each show), the concept seemed ideal. The brothers were filmed in Hollywood, while the other scenes would have been shot at Pinewood Studios in England.

The pilot was never completed. When doctors discovered that Chico was suffering from arteriosclerosis (he died on October 11, 1961) and thus could not be insured, the producers had to cancel the project.

== Availability ==
All that remains of the pilot episode of Deputy Seraph is about fifteen minutes of raw, unedited footage, available at the Marx Brothers website.
