= Phantom train =

Phantom train may refer to:

- Phantom trains, an alternative name for Holocaust trains, used to transport Jews to Nazi concentration and extermination camps
- Phantom train, an alternative name for the Nazi ghost train which attempted to transport political prisoners from Brussels to concentration camps in Germany.

== Entertainment ==
- "Phantom Train", a track from Music from FFV and FFVI Video Games, a Final Fantasy compilation album
- The Phantom Train, international title of Trenul fantomă, a 1933 Romanian film
- Yōkai Express! The Phantom Train, a GeGeGe no Kitarō film

== See also ==
- Death train (disambiguation)
- Ghost train (disambiguation)
- Haunted Train (disambiguation)
