= Haunted Train =

Haunted Train may refer to:

- Haunted Train, a festival held at Florenceville-Bristol, New Brunswick, every October
- "Haunted Train", 1996 episode of Hey Arnold! animated TV series
- The Haunted Wagon Train, a BBC Books adventure book written by Colin Brake, based on the Doctor Who TV series

== See also ==
- Death train (disambiguation)
- Ghost train (disambiguation)
- Phantom train (disambiguation)
