= Lisette Verea =

Actor (1914–2003)

- Lisette Verea
- Born: Lisette Veksler Verea; August 27, 1914; Bucharest, Kingdom of Romania
- Died: August 27, 2003 (aged 89); New York City, U.S.A.
- Occupations: Singer, actress
- Spouse: Erhart Ruegg (m. 1946; died 1950)

Lisette Verea (August 27, 1914 – August 27, 2003) was a Jewish Romanian-born cabaret singer and actress, best-known for her appearance in the Marx Brothers film A Night in Casablanca (1946).

== Early life ==
Lisette Verea was born in Bucharest, in a Jewish family, as the daughter of Hainerik Chaim Veksler Verea and Olga Veksler Verea.

== Career ==
Verea moved to the United States in 1941. Her name appears on the passenger list on President Grant liner, which arrived in New York on October 3, 1941. In 1944, she appeared on Broadway in a pair of operettas on a double bill (La Serva Patrona and The Secret of Suzanne), and in a revival of The Merry Widow. In 1946, publicity proclaimed her "Hollywood's newest glamor girl."

Screen appearances by Verea included Trenul fantoma (1933) and in the Marx Brothers film A Night in Casablanca (1946). In A Night in Casablanca, she sang "Who's Sorry Now?" in French and English. The New York Times critic enjoyed her performance, calling her character Beatrice "a flashy brunette who is played with an extravagant flounce by Lisette Verea".

== Personal life ==
Verea married first in 1946, to textile manufacturer Erhart Ruegg; he died in 1950. One of Erhart's children from a previous marriage was Buddhologist David Seyfort Ruegg. Verea's second marriage was in 1954 to Olympic gold-medalist tennis player Francis Hunter.

In 1964, she, her sister Bella, and a maid were the victims of a home-invasion robbery at the Hunters' estate in Southampton, Long Island. Verea died in New York City on August 27, 2003, her 89th birthday.

== Filmography ==
Year	Title	Role	Notes
1933	Trenul fantoma	Mary	
1946	A Night in Casablanca	Bea	
