= Death train =

Death train may refer to:

- Death trains, an alternative name for Holocaust trains, used to transport Jews to Nazi concentration and extermination camps
- Death Train, a novel by Alastair MacNeill, based on the UNACO screenplay by Alistair MacLean
- Death Train, first of The Sergeant series of novels by Len Levinson writing as Gordon Davis
- "Death Train", a song from the album Sinking the Eight Ball by Ruby Joe
- "The Death Train", El tren de la muerte, or La Bestia, a dangerous network of Mexican freight trains that are utilized by U.S.- bound migrants to more quickly traverse the length of Mexico

== Film and television ==
- Death Train, 1993 TV movie starring Pierce Brosnan, based on the novel by Alastair MacNeill
- Death Train, alternative name for Beyond the Door III, 1989 Italian horror film
- Death Train, last of the 2004 Hideshi Hino's Theater of Horror series of Japanese horror films
- The Death Train, 1978 Australian TV film starring Hugh Keays-Byrne

== See also ==
- Ghost train (disambiguation)
- Haunted Train (disambiguation)
- Phantom train (disambiguation)
