= The Incredible Jewel Robbery =

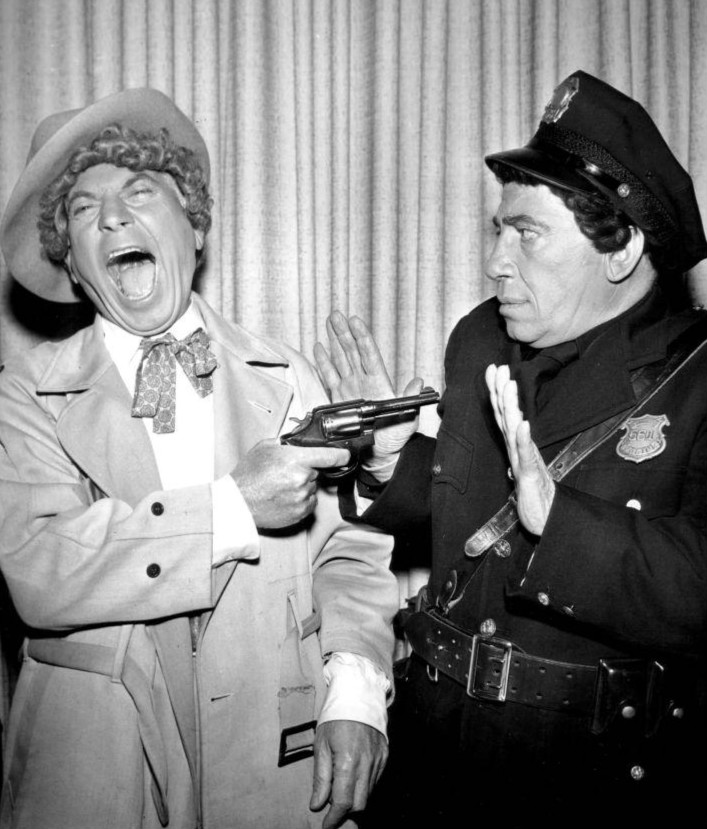
Harpo and Chico in a scene from the program (Chico became ill and later died on October 11, 1961)

"The Incredible Jewel Robbery" was an episode of General Electric Theater, broadcast by CBS on March 8, 1959. It was the first appearance of the three Marx Brothers together in the same scene since A Night in Casablanca in 1946. They had previously appeared in individual scenes in The Story of Mankind in 1957, and in pairs in Love Happy in 1949 (Chico and Harpo appear together; Groucho is in one brief shot with Harpo in the chase scene, and Chico is in a cutaway shot in the wrap-up in Groucho's office). "Jewel Robbery" would be their last joint TV appearance.

CBS explained the show as follows: "If you watch the show you'll see a familiar face equipped with mustache and leer. Because of his contract terms, his name can't be mentioned, but he is not Jerry Colonna." This refers to the fact that Groucho was still hosting You Bet Your Life on NBC.

== Plot ==
Harpo and Chico play Harry and Nick, two inept would-be robbers who try to pull a jewelry heist. Chico is disguised in a police uniform, and Harpo wears a Groucho Marx disguise. When they are caught and placed in a police lineup, the real Groucho shows up and is immediately fingered as the thief. Groucho then delivers the only line in the otherwise silent program: "We won't talk until we see our lawyer!" Everybody gives each other their leg, and the You Bet Your Life duck drops down with "The End" in its beak.
