= Marx Brothers =

American comedy team (1905–1949)

The Marx Brothers
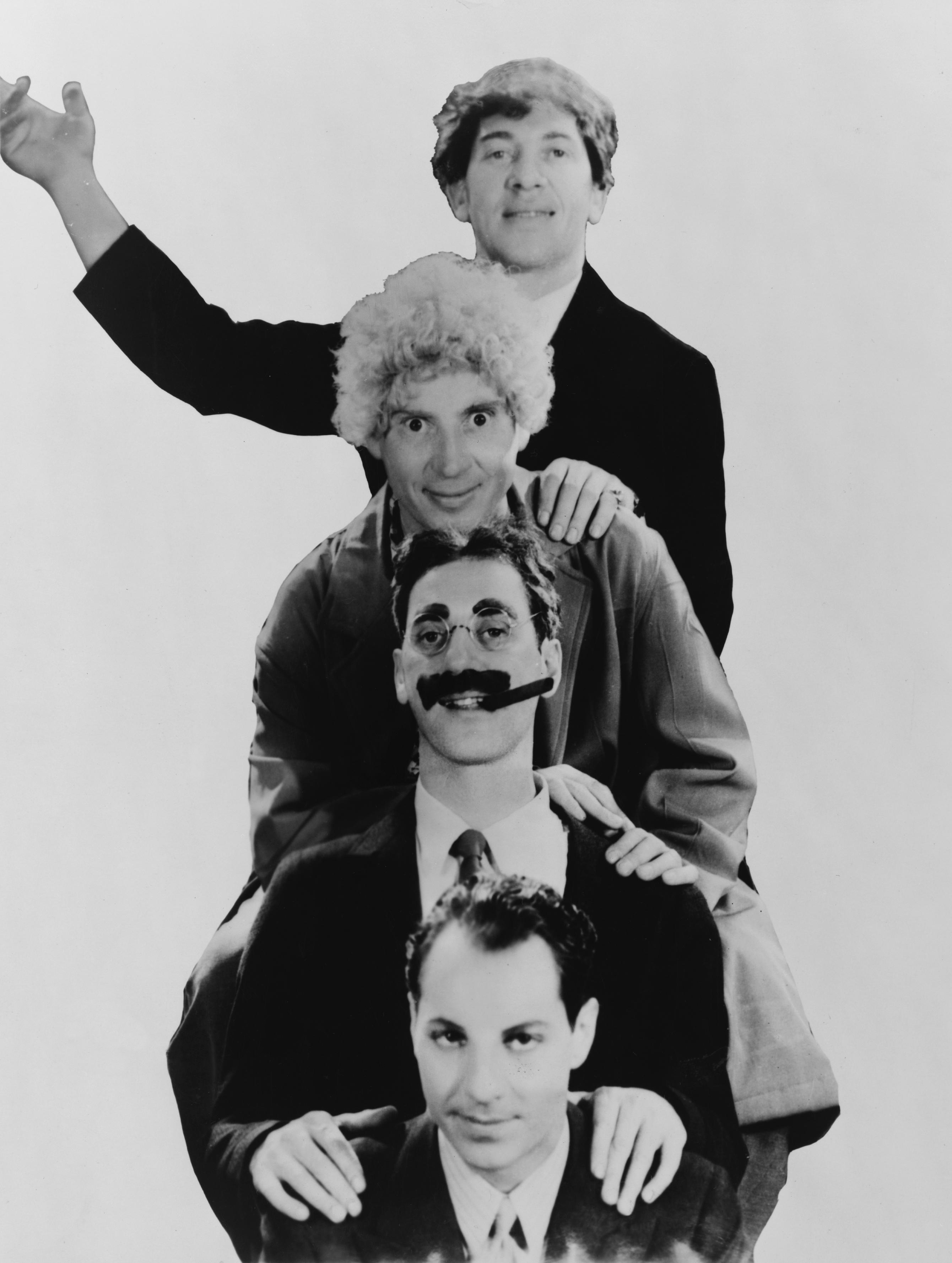
- Four of the five Marx Brothers in 1931 (top to bottom: Chico, Harpo, Groucho and Zeppo)
- Born: New York, U.S.
- Notable work: Animal Crackers; Monkey Business; Horse Feathers; Duck Soup; A Night at the Opera; A Day at the Races

Comedy career
- Years active: 1905–1949
- Medium: Broadway, film, vaudeville
- Genres: Word play, slapstick, musical comedy, deadpan
- Former members: Chico Marx; Harpo Marx; Groucho Marx; Gummo Marx; Zeppo Marx

The Marx Brothers were an American comedy troupe who achieved success in vaudeville, on Broadway, and in 13 motion pictures. The five brothers were Chico Marx, Harpo Marx, Groucho Marx, Gummo Marx, and Zeppo Marx, though Gummo and Zeppo both left the group over time, leaving Chico, Harpo, and Groucho as a trio. They are considered by critics, scholars and fans to be among the greatest and most influential comedians of the 20th century, a recognition underscored by the American Film Institute (AFI) selecting five of their thirteen feature films to be among the top 100 comedy films (with two in the top fifteen) and including them as the only group of performers on AFI's 100 Years...100 Stars list of the 25 greatest male stars of Classical Hollywood cinema.

Their performing lives, heavily influenced by their mother, Minnie Marx, started with Groucho on stage at age 14, in 1905. He was joined, in succession, by Gummo and Harpo. Chico started a separate vaudeville act in 1911, and joined his brothers in 1912. Zeppo replaced Gummo when the latter joined the army in World War I. The brothers performed in vaudeville until 1923, when they found themselves banned from the major vaudeville circuits owing to a dispute with E. F. Albee. Failing in an attempt to produce their own shows on the alternate Shubert circuit, they transitioned to Broadway, where they achieved success with a series of hit musical comedies, including I'll Say She Is, The Cocoanuts, and Animal Crackers.

In 1928, the Marx Brothers made a deal with Paramount Pictures to appear in a screen version of The Cocoanuts, which was filmed at Paramount's Astoria Studios during the Broadway run of Animal Crackers. The Cocoanuts was released in 1929, followed the next year by a film version of Animal Crackers. They then moved to Los Angeles, where they starred in three more films for Paramount: Monkey Business (1931), Horse Feathers (1932), and Duck Soup (1933).

When their contract expired following the production of Duck Soup, Zeppo left the team and the Marx Brothers left Paramount. Groucho, Chico and Harpo were signed by Irving Thalberg at Metro-Goldwyn-Mayer, where they starred in A Night at the Opera (1935), which they considered to be their best film. Shortly after filming began on their follow-up movie, A Day at the Races (1937), Thalberg died of pneumonia at the age of 37. While they continued to appear in films, they felt that the quality of their work, as well as their interest in it, was waning.

After starring in Room Service (1938) for RKO Pictures, the brothers returned to MGM for At the Circus (1939) and Go West (1940). Although they announced that their next MGM film, The Big Store (1941), would be their farewell picture, they returned to the screen in A Night in Casablanca (1946), reportedly because Chico needed money. In 1949, they starred together in their final film, Love Happy.

Groucho went on to a successful career as host of the quiz show You Bet Your Life, while Harpo and Chico continued to make guest appearances on television and on the stage.

== Family background and early life ==
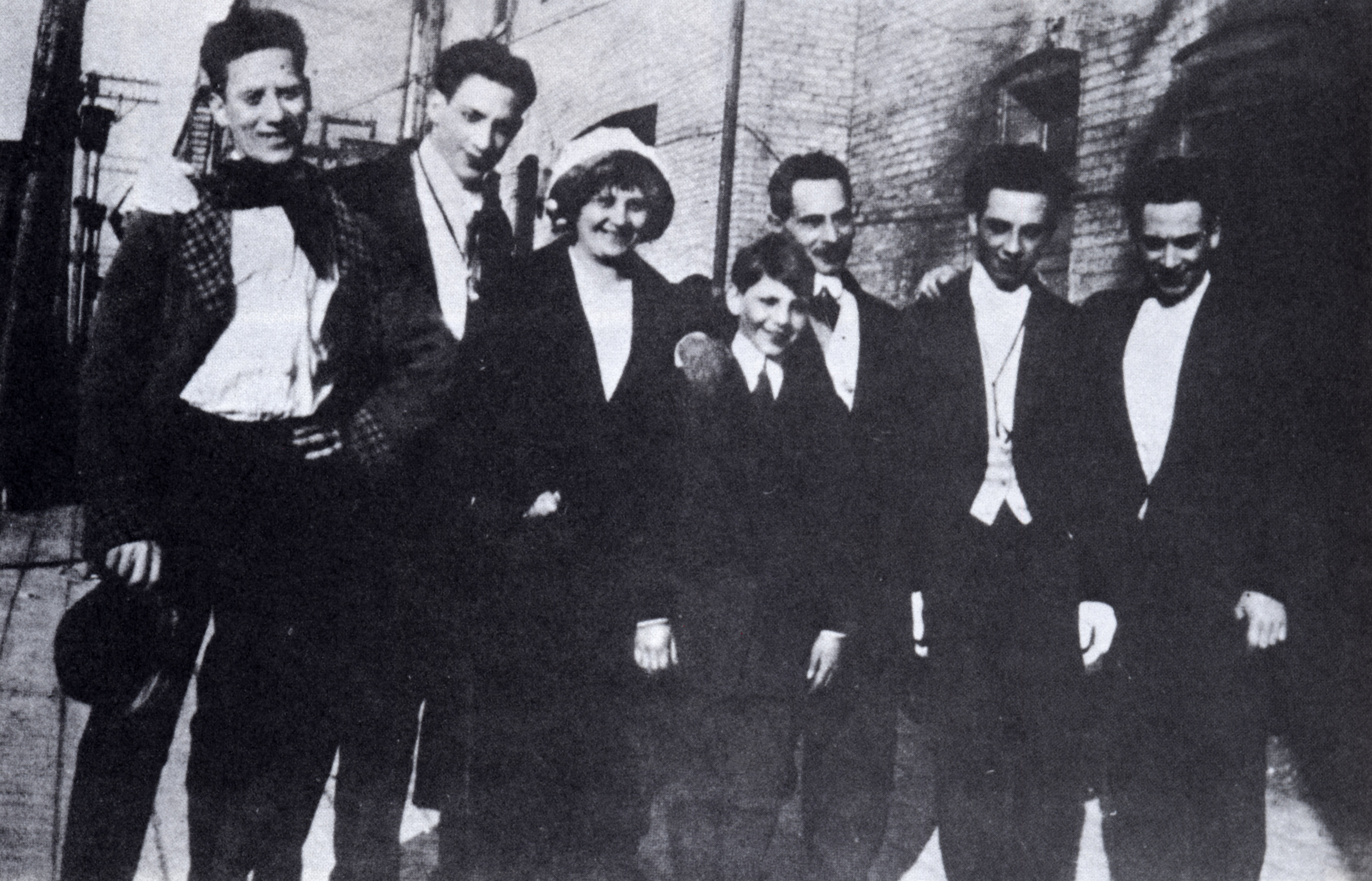
The only known photo of the entire surviving Marx family, c. 1915. From left: Groucho, Gummo, Minnie (mother), Zeppo, Sam (father), Chico, and Harpo.

The Marx Brothers were born in New York City, the sons of Jewish immigrants. Their mother Miene ("Minnie") Marx (née Schoenberg) was from Dornum in East Frisia, then a part of the Kingdom of Hanover. She came from a family of performers. Her mother was a yodeling harpist and her father a ventriloquist; both were funfair entertainers. Around 1880, the family emigrated to New York City. Their father, Samuel ("Sam" or "Frenchy"; born Simon) Marx, was a native of Mertzwiller, a small village in Alsace, France, and worked as a tailor. Minnie and Sam married on January 18, 1885.

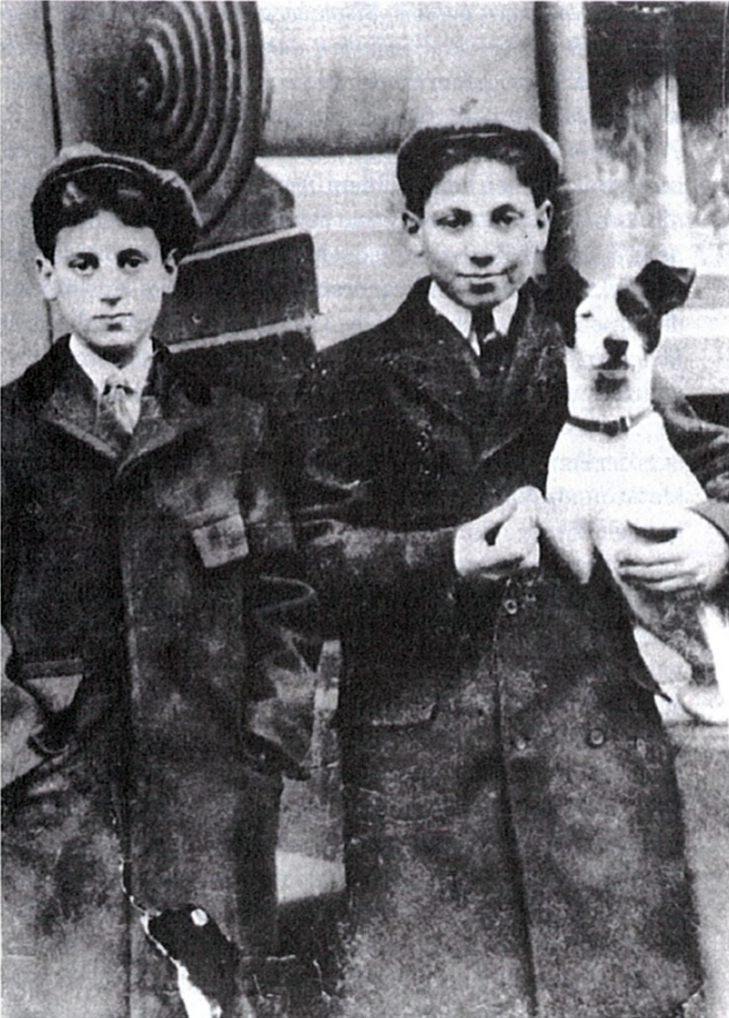
Julius Henry Marx (Groucho, left) and Adolph Marx (Harpo) holding a rat terrier dog, c. 1906

The family lived in New York City's Upper East Side in the Yorkville district centered in the Irish, German and Italian quarters. The eldest child in the household was their cousin Pauline, or "Polly", whom they often referred to as an adopted sister. The Marxes' firstborn son, Manfred, died aged seven months, on July 17, 1886, of enterocolitis, with asthenia contributing (i.e., probably a victim of influenza). He is buried in Washington Cemetery (Brooklyn, NY), beside his grandmother, Fanny Sophie Schönberg (née Salomons), who died on April 10, 1901. Leonard Joseph "Chico" Marx was born on March 22, 1887; Adolph "Harpo" Marx was born on November 23, 1888; Julius Henry "Groucho" Marx on October 2, 1890; Milton "Gummo" Marx on October 21, 1892; and the youngest, Herbert Manfred "Zeppo" Marx, on February 25, 1901.

In 1909, the family moved to Chicago, home to three major vaudeville talent agencies. They lived in several Chicago locations, one of which now has a historical marker, until moving east again in 1920.

== Stage beginnings ==
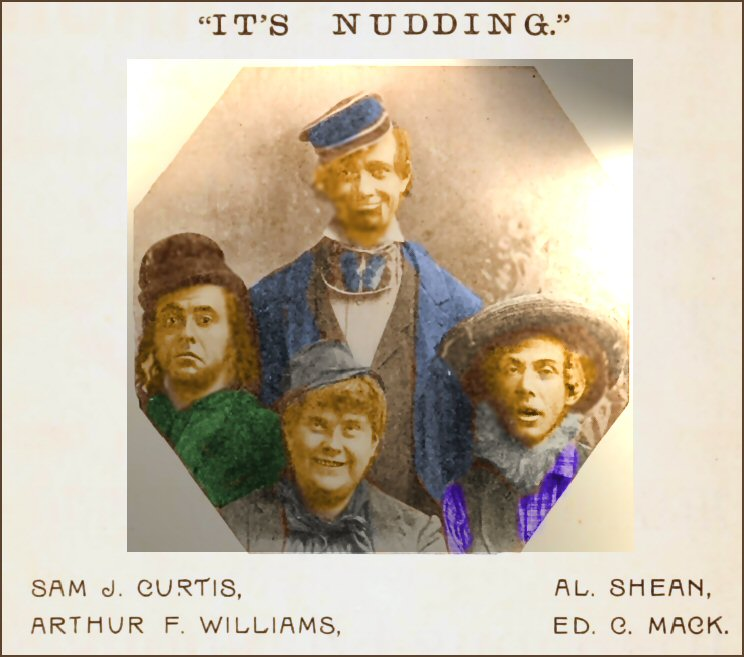
Al Shean, Sam J. Curtis, Arthur F. Williams, Ed C. Mack – the original Manhattan Comedy Four in "It's Nudding" 1898–99

=== 1905–1914: Rise in independent vaudeville ===
==== Early performances ====
Minnie helped her younger brother Abraham Schönberg (stage name Al Shean) enter show business; he became successful in vaudeville and on Broadway as half of the musical comedy double act Gallagher and Shean. His success, and the family's theater background, inspired her to encourage her children to follow in his footsteps. Using the name Minnie Palmer—so that agents did not realize that she was also their mother—she acted as the brothers' manager. All the brothers said, at various points, that Minnie Marx had been the head of the family, the driving force in getting the troupe launched, and the only person who could keep them in order; she was also said to be a hard bargainer with theater management.

Groucho made his stage debut as a singer in 1905. In 1907, Minnie approached vaudeville director Ned Wayburn to produce Groucho in a singing act with Gummo; together with his own discovery, Mabel O'Donnell, they went on the road as "The Three Nightingales". By November of that year, Wayburn had moved on, and the act continued under Minnie's direction. She replaced O'Donnell with a singer named Lou Levy.

The next year, having accidentally booked the act as a quartet at a Coney Island venue, and being short a fourth member, Minnie went to a movie theater where Harpo was working, and demanded that he quit his job and join the act immediately. In spite of the fact that he didn't know the songs they were supposed to sing, Harpo went along, later remembering an inauspicious beginning: "With my first look at my first audience, I reverted to being a boy again. I wet my pants. It was probably the most wretched debut in show business." Harpo had become the fourth Nightingale. By 1910, he officially changed his name from Adolph, which he had never liked, to Arthur. The same year, the troupe, renamed "The Six Mascots", briefly expanded to include Minnie and the brothers' Aunt Hannah.

One evening in 1909, a performance at the Opera House in Nacogdoches, Texas was interrupted by shouts from outside about a runaway mule. The audience hurried out to see what was happening. Groucho was angered by the interruption and, when the audience returned, he made snide comments at their expense, including "Nacogdoches is full of roaches" and "the jackass is the flower of Tex-ass". Instead of becoming angry, the audience laughed. The family then realized that it had potential as a comic troupe. (Note: The time and place of this performance has been disputed. In his autobiography Harpo Speaks, Harpo Marx stated that the runaway mule incident occurred in Ada, Oklahoma. A 1930 article in the San Antonio Express newspaper stated that the incident took place in Marshall, Texas. However, most sources claim that it took place in Nacogdoches. A story of a runaway horse can be found in Nacogdoches papers in late April 1909, before the act started to focus on comedy, so author Robert Bader uses this date.)

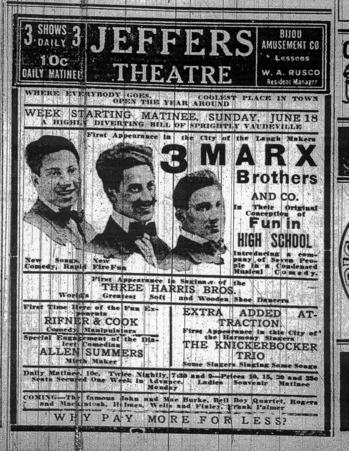
1911 newspaper advertisement for a Marx Brothers appearance (l–r: Harpo, Groucho, Gummo)

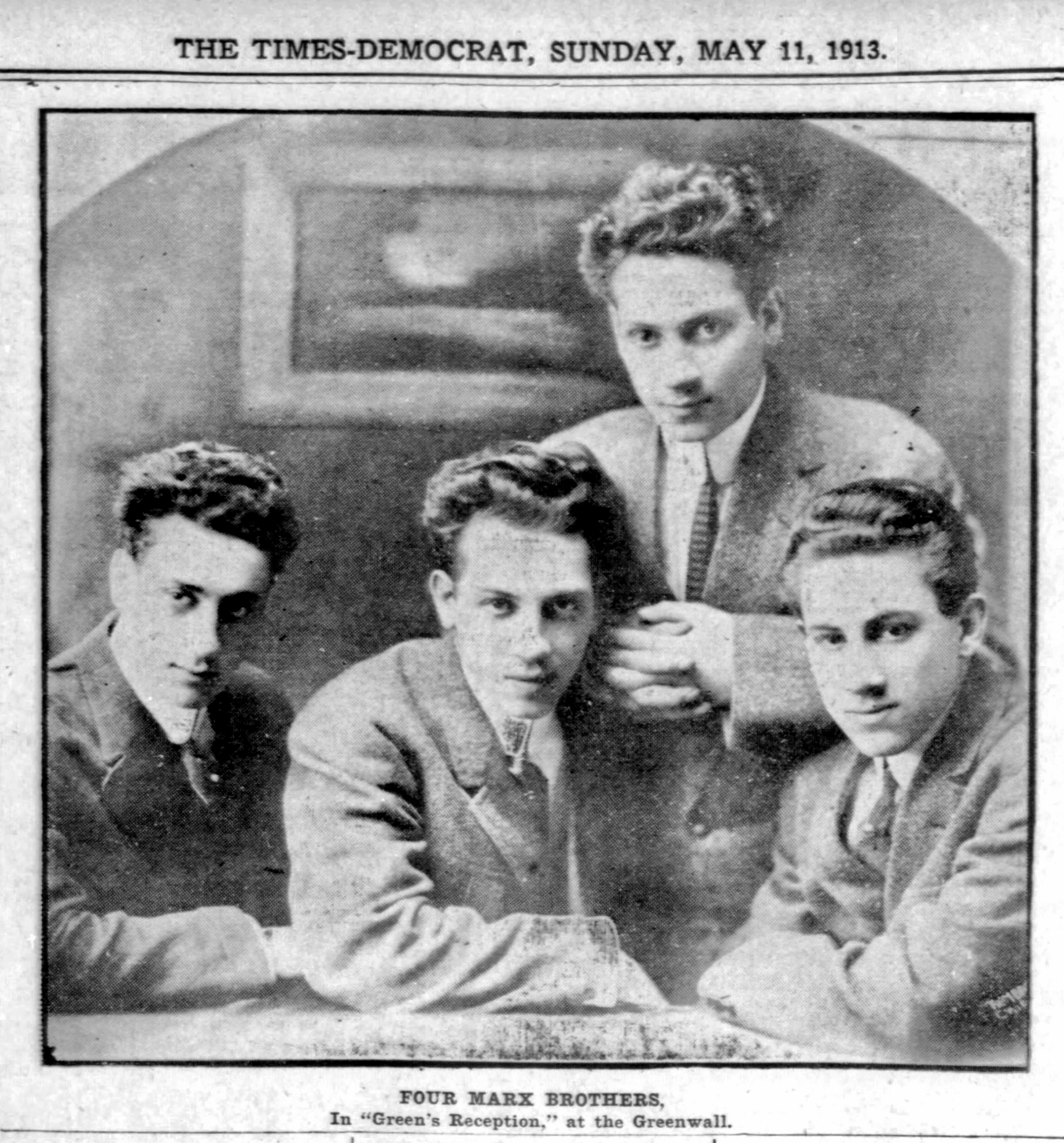
1913 advertisement for "Green's Reception" at the Greenwall. Left to right, Groucho, Chico, Harpo and Gummo.

Over time, the act evolved from singing with comedy to comedy with music. The brothers' comedy sketch Fun in High School (sometimes styled Fun in Hi Skule) featured Groucho as a German-accented teacher presiding over a classroom that included students Harpo, Gummo, and, after he joined the act in 1912, Chico. The brothers toured successfully with Fun in High School for several years, sometimes alternating with a comedy billed as Mr. Green's Reception, a similar production in which the schoolmaster and his students were portrayed as older characters.

In early 1911, Chico was working at music publishing firm Shapiro, Bernstein & Co., when the founder of that company, Maurice Shapiro, died. Chico quit immediately, (Note: It is not clear why Chico quit immediately when Shapiro died. Robert Bader hypothesizes that he may not have wanted to work for Bernstein.) convincing a young tenor, Aaron Gordon, to tour with him in vaudeville. At the time, there was a successful vaudeville act called The Two Funny Germans, starring Bill Gordon and Nick Marx; with Minnie's encouragement, Aaron Gordon and Chico Marx adopted Italian accents (Chico's reputedly based on that of his barber) and toured as Marx and Gordon. Gordon left the act in the fall of that year, and, after failing to break through with two other partners, Chico finally joined his brothers' comedy act in September 1912.

==== Origin of their stage names ====
It was during their early years in vaudeville that the brothers received their stage names, which were given to them by monologist Art Fisher during a poker game. (Note: The time and place of this poker game are in dispute. The brothers' authorized biographies differ on the location, placing it variously in Galesburg, Illinois, Aurora, Illinois, and Rockford, Illinois. The book Four of the Three Musketeers: The Marx Brothers on Stage gives a date of May 1914, when the brothers are known to have performed in Galesburg, Illinois. However, Art Fisher retired from vaudeville in 1912 and was living in Boston in 1914. Fisher and the Marxes appeared together in Joliet, Illinois in December 1910, prior to Chico's joining the act. The naming may have taken place either at that time - with Chico receiving his name at a later date - or during a 1915 trip to Boston.) The nicknames were influenced by Gus Mager's comic strip Sherlocko the Monk, which featured a character named "Groucho", reflecting the "O" nickname fad of the era. As Fisher dealt each brother a card, he addressed them, for the first time, by the names they kept for the rest of their lives.

Most accounts attribute Julius's nickname "Groucho" to his notably moody temperament. Alternative theories suggest that it derived from the Groucho character in Sherlocko the Monk, or from the "grouch bag" he carried, containing money and necessities. (Note: Groucho denied the claim that the nickname referred to the grouch bag in his autobiography Groucho and Me.) Leonard was named "Chicko" because of his reputation for chasing women (or "chicks"). "Chicko" was eventually shortened to "Chico", but still pronounced "Chick-o" rather than "Cheek-o." Arthur was dubbed "Harpo" because he played the harp.

Milton's nickname "Gummo" stemmed from his habit of wearing rubber-soled shoes, although the details varied depending on who was telling the story. Harpo claimed that Milton earned the name by sneaking around theaters like a gumshoe detective. Other sources reported that Gummo was the family's hypochondriac, and therefore wore rubber overshoes whenever he thought it might rain, or that he was the troupe's best dancer, and dance shoes tended to have rubber soles.

=== 1914–1922: Home Again, World War I, and failure in Vaudeville ===
==== Home Again ====
The Marx Brothers' early vaudeville shows often received mixed reviews; while critics were generally kind to the performers themselves, they frequently noted the low quality of the material. When the Marxes attempted to play larger venues, audiences were often unreceptive. One Chicago critic, for example, wrote: "The so-called Marx Brothers do well, but in the worst kind of vaudeville. In other words, they are so good that they stink." Eventually, even local reviewers began to find the jokes stale, with one in Hammond, Indiana, describing them as "musty." Faced with dwindling appeal, the brothers turned to their uncle, Al Shean, a veteran vaudeville performer, to help them develop new material. Shean responded by writing Home Again, an expanded version of their earlier act, Mr. Green's Reception.

Home Again proved to be a pivotal production, solidifying the Marx Brothers' distinctive comedic personas. Shean, who had portrayed a fast-talking German character in his own act, created a similar role for Groucho. This character began to incorporate Groucho's trademark greasepaint mustache and a stooped walk. For Harpo, Shean intentionally wrote few lines, contributing to the decision for him to stop speaking on stage. Explanations for this varied: Shean attributed it to Harpo's lisp, while Harpo himself stated that positive reviews of the act often said that he was better when he did not speak. (Note: Harpo frequently told another story: that after telling a theater owner that he wished his theater would burn down, it did - at which point, he superstitiously stopped speaking in the act entirely.) It was during this period that Harpo also adopted his signature wig and horn. Gummo, and later Zeppo, assumed the role of the romantic straight man, a part James Agee famously described as "peerlessly cheesy."

The reception to Home Again was overwhelmingly positive, with the show playing to packed audiences. Confident in its success, the brothers even guaranteed that if theaters did not surpass their average revenue, they would perform for free. A review in Billboard hailed it as "a good meaty character comedy," adding that "the company's work fully entitle them to their six [curtain calls]."

By the end of 1914, Home Again had become popular enough to secure a contract with the United Booking Office (UBO), which controlled the highest-paying theaters in the country. This allowed them to begin sharing bills with more prominent acts, such as Jack Benny and W.C. Fields. Fields, reportedly concerned about unfavorable comparisons, once feigned a broken wrist to avoid following them on stage.

In 1915, the Home Again tour reached Flint, Michigan, where 14-year-old Zeppo joined his four brothers for what is believed to be the only time that all five Marx Brothers appeared together on stage. The September 3, 1915, edition of The Flint Daily Journal documented this performance, noting that Zeppo sang "four or five songs" and "gives promise of becoming as much of a favorite as the rest of the family."

==== World War I, Gummo leaves, and Zeppo joins ====
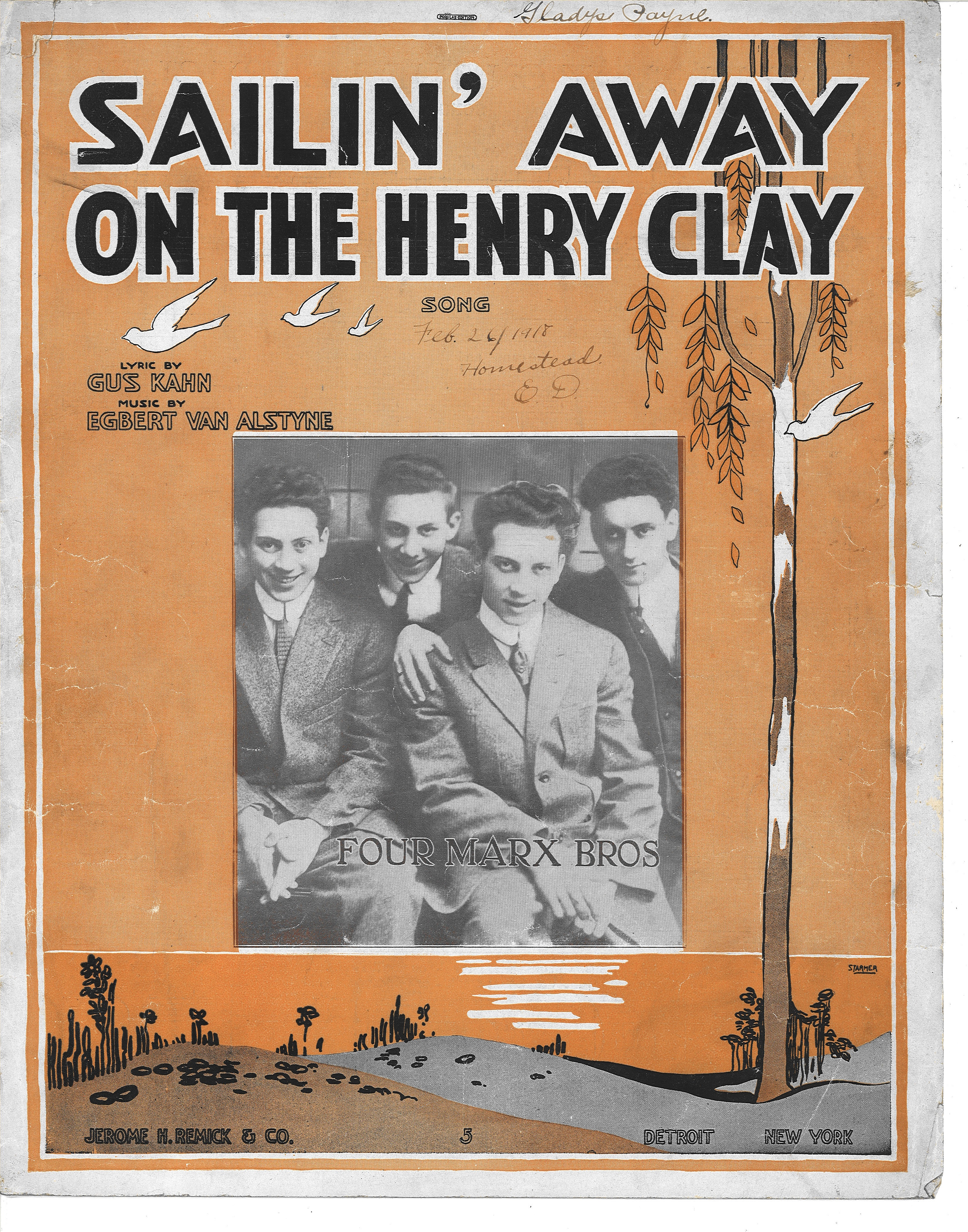
Sheet music published in 1917 for the song "Sailing Away on the Henry Clay"; from left: Harpo, Gummo, Chico, Groucho

The outbreak of World War I in 1914 and the sinking of the RMS Lusitania in 1915 triggered strong anti-German sentiment across America, forcing the Marx Brothers to distance themselves from their German heritage. Groucho abandoned his German stage persona entirely, dropping his exaggerated accent and changing his character's name from "Schneider" to the more American "Jones."

As the United States entered the war, Minnie Marx attempted to secure draft exemptions for her sons by purchasing a 27-acre (11 ha) poultry farm near Countryside, Illinois. Despite these efforts, by summer 1918, Gummo was drafted into military service. Unlike his brothers, he had grown dissatisfied with performing and welcomed the change, later quipping that he "went to war to get a little peace."

Gummo's departure created an immediate vacancy in the act. The youngest Marx brother, Zeppo, was working as a mechanic at Ford when Minnie instructed him to leave his job and join his brothers on stage. He later recalled being so unprepared that he had to improvise his lines and abstain from dance numbers during his early performances.

The origin of Zeppo's stage name, which he received around this time, remains contested. Several theories have emerged. Harpo claimed in his memoir that the nickname referenced a trained chimpanzee named Zippo from another vaudeville act. Other family members suggested connections to the popular "Zeke and Zeb" rural humor of the era. Chico's daughter Maxine maintained that the name evolved from a joke between her father and Herbert, beginning with "Zeb" and eventually becoming "Zeppo." Groucho offered yet another explanation, saying the name derived from the first transatlantic flights by zeppelins, although this did not happen until 1924. (Note: Groucho made these claims in a tape-recorded interview excerpted on The Unknown Marx Brothers, as well as in his Carnegie Hall concert in 1972. The first zeppelin flew in July 1900, and Herbert was born seven months later in February 1901.)

==== Decline and failure in vaudeville ====
Humor Risk (1921), now long-lost, was the first Marx Brothers' film. Pictured in a photograph the same year, from left to right, are Zeppo, Groucho, Harpo, and Chico.

In April 1921, during a break from their touring schedule, the brothers took their first foray into motion pictures, producing a short silent film titled Humor Risk. Written by Jo Swerling, the film featured Groucho playing a villain, and Harpo playing a romantic lead named Watson. Following a poorly received single screening in the Bronx - reportedly marked by disruptive children and impassive adults - the brothers decided against releasing the film. No copies of Humor Risk are known to survive.

In the summer of 1922, facing a lack of bookings in the United States, the brothers took their act to the UK, where they performed shows in London, Bristol, and Manchester. E. F. Albee, who ran the UBO that controlled the brothers' contract, required that acts that played in the chain's theaters get his permission before playing in other venues. Not having asked Albee before traveling to Britain, the brothers were blacklisted from all UBO-controlled theaters upon their return to the United States.

Needing to find another venue for their act, the Marx Brothers produced a show called The Twentieth Century Revue on the smaller Shubert circuit. At the time, the Shuberts were engaged in a lawsuit against the brothers' uncle, Al Shean. The brothers made less money on the Shubert circuit, and their act was padded with other Shubert talent of mixed quality. The show was a failure: reviews of the Marxes were positive, but the other acts were met with antipathy. The Cincinnati Post of February 12, 1923, in describing the other acts, said "there are other periods where it seems everyone is sparring for time. This of course is not pleasant." Former cast members of the Revue sued the brothers, alleging unpaid salaries. Sheriffs seized the Revue's assets, leading to the show's closure.

=== 1924–1929: Success on Broadway ===
==== I'll Say She Is ====
Having been banned from the largest vaudeville circuit, and having failed on the second largest, the Marx Brothers were at a low point. In his memoir Harpo Speaks, Harpo remembered a plan to break up the team: “It had been decided that Groucho should audition as a single, Zeppo return to Chicago with Minnie, and Chico hire out as a piano player. To all of these decisions I said: ‘Nuts’”.

Ned Wayburn, who had produced Groucho and Gummo in The Three Nightingales, introduced the Marxes to writers Tom and Will Johnstone, who had an idea for a new show. They reached out to Joe Gaites, another Shubert veteran, whose recent failed production, Gimme a Thrill, had left him with unused scenery and costumes. The Johnstones felt that they could put together a successful show with the Marxes using the costuming, scenery, and the more successful songs and plot from that show. They found a backer: a man named James P. Beury, who had recently purchased the Walnut Street Theater in Philadelphia (and was reputedly looking for a starring vehicle for a chorus girl he was dating).

The show, based on Gimme a Thrill, but rewritten by the Johnstones, was titled I'll Say She Is. It premiered in Allentown, Pennsylvania in May 1923. After successful initial showings, the production moved to Beury's theater in Pennsylvania for the summer. The show then played in Boston during September, followed by Chicago for the remainder of the year, before embarking on a nationwide tour. In May 1924, I'll Say She Is premiered on Broadway. For this occasion, their mother Minnie was being fitted for a custom dress, when she fell and broke her ankle. Determined not to miss the premiere, she attended the show on a stretcher.

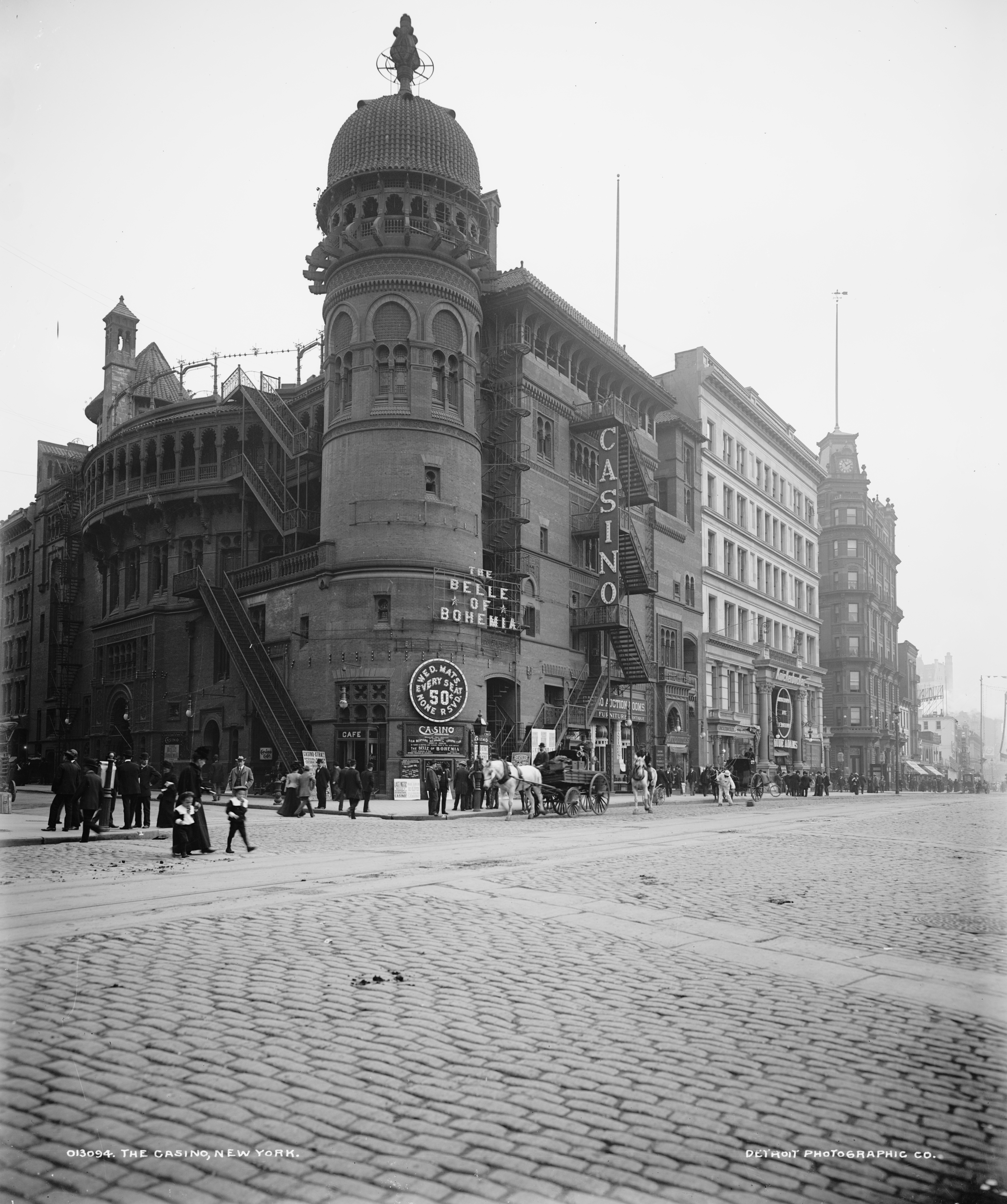
Casino Theatre, Broadway and 39th Street, Manhattan, where I'll Say She Is ran

The Broadway premiere of I'll Say She Is launched a new phase of the Marx Brothers' careers. Positive reviews appeared in most of the New York dailies, including the New York Sun, the New York Evening Post, the New York Daily News, The New York Daily Mirror, and Life Magazine. The production became a commercial success, running for 313 performances and consistently playing to near-capacity audiences. The reviewer for the Sun was Alexander Woollcott, who was to become a lifelong friend of Harpo's. Woollcott introduced Harpo to the Algonquin Round Table, a collection of intellectuals who met regularly at the Algonquin Hotel in Manhattan. He also convinced the brothers - who had been billed to that point as Julius, Leonard, Arthur, and Herbert - to go by their stage names in public.

==== The Cocoanuts and Animal Crackers ====
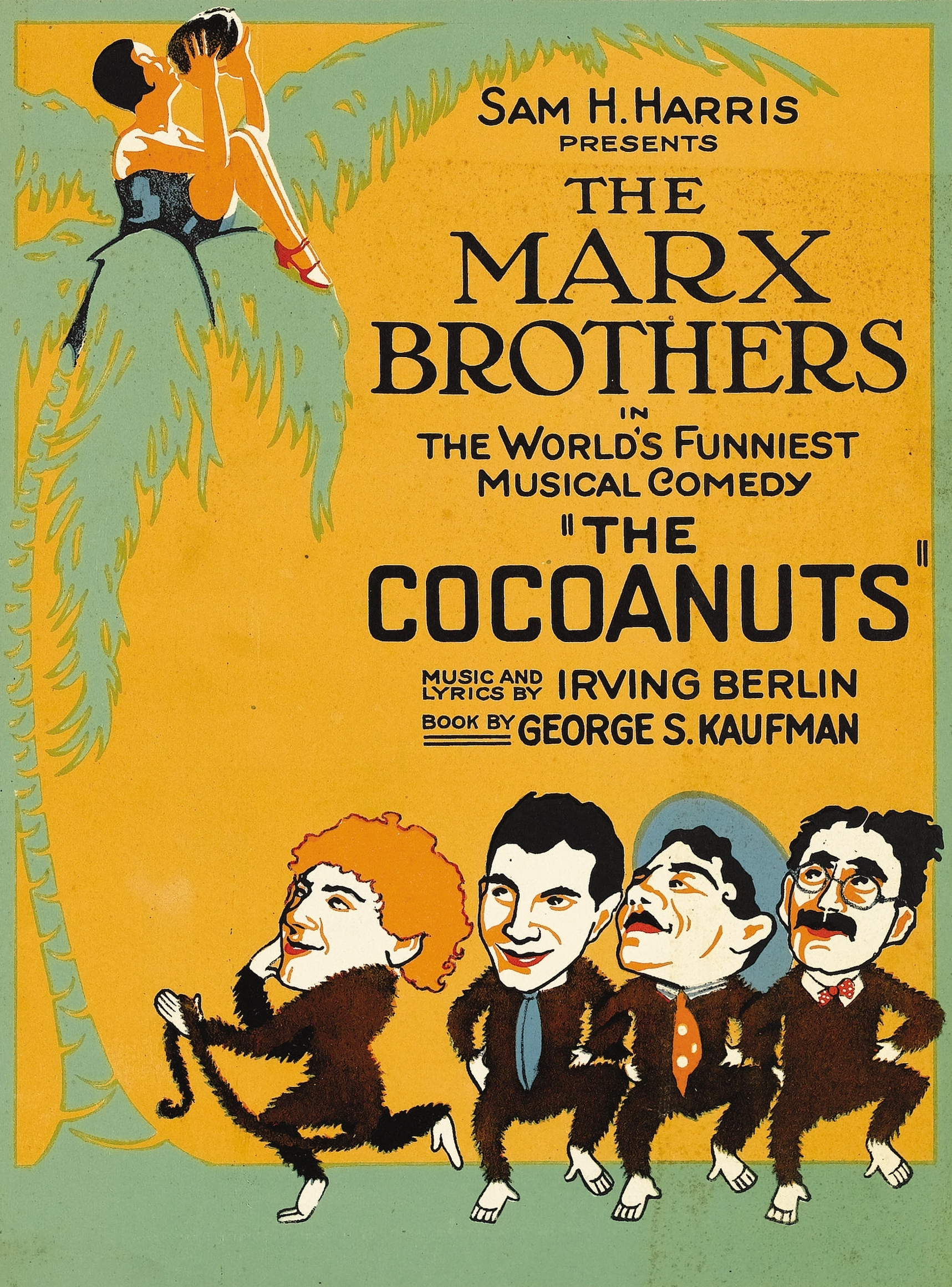
Production card for the 1927 run of The Cocoanuts

The success of I'll Say She Is attracted numerous producers eager to develop the Marx Brothers' next show. After being unable to come to an agreement with Florenz Ziegfeld, the brothers settled on Sam H. Harris, due to his association with composer Irving Berlin. Harris recruited George S. Kaufman, a member of the Algonquin Round Table, to write the show. Kaufman, who knew of the brothers' tendency to harass writers and ignore the script, reportedly exclaimed, "Are you crazy? Write a show for the Marx Brothers? I'd rather write a show for the Barbary apes!" Nevertheless, Kaufman signed on, believing that a show starring the Marx Brothers, with music by Berlin, was almost certainly going to be a hit.

The Cocoanuts, penned by Kaufman, with music by Berlin, premiered in Boston in October 1925, and came to Broadway in December of that year. Unlike their previous show, which had been a revue, The Cocoanuts featured a coherent narrative - albeit one frequently interrupted by the brothers' comedy. Set during the Florida land boom, the plot involved a hotel owner named Hammer (Groucho) trying to sell real estate, the theft of a valuable necklace, and a romance. The production showcased several now-classic Marx Brothers routines, including the "Why a Duck?" sequence, in which Groucho attempts to explain a map to Chico, leading to an increasingly absurd series of misunderstandings about the difference between "viaduct" and "why a duck." The critics were glowing, with Woollcott saying, "It need only be reported that The Cocoanuts is so funny it's positively weakening." The production ran for 276 performances on Broadway before touring.

The Cocoanuts was notable for another Marx Brothers first: the inclusion in the cast of Margaret Dumont, a former small-time vaudevillian who had married into wealth, become widowed, and then been forced to take the stage again. Dumont played Mrs. Potter, a wealthy widow and object of Hammer's romantic pursuits. Writer Morrie Ryskind, who had performed uncredited work on The Cocoanuts, remembered that, from when she stepped on stage, "it became obvious [...] that the addition of Miss Dumont [...] filled a long neglected void, and that a great comedy team had been launched." She would go on to reprise her role as straight foil to Groucho in their next Broadway production and in seven of their movies. Groucho later reflected that Dumont "never understood any of my jokes". Interviews showed that Dumont understood comedy, and was a skilled performer who understood precisely how to play opposite him.

Sam Harris brought together many of the same creative talents for the next Marx Brothers production, Animal Crackers. Kaufman would again develop the book, this time with co-writer Morrie Ryskind receiving full credit. Margaret Dumont would again play the foil. In place of Irving Berlin, lyrics and music were provided by Bert Kalmar and Harry Ruby. Kalmar and Ruby supplied "Hooray for Captain Spaulding", which was to become Groucho's signature tune, and later the theme music for his television program You Bet Your Life.

Animal Crackers premiered at the 44th Street Theatre on October 23, 1928, after an out-of-town tryout. The plot centered on a high-society gathering at the Long Island mansion of Mrs. Rittenhouse (Dumont), where a valuable painting is stolen. Groucho played explorer Captain Jeffrey T. Spaulding, Zeppo played his secretary, while Harpo and Chico took roles as musicians. Like The Cocoanuts and I'll Say She Is, it was successful: it ran for 171 performances, with The New Yorker describing it as “the very concoction for which the word ‘wow’ had been coined”.

== Motion pictures ==
=== 1929–1933: Paramount ===
As Animal Crackers began its tour, Paramount Pictures signed the Marx Brothers to create a film adaptation of The Cocoanuts. Filming commenced in February 1929 at Astoria Studios in Queens. The movie would be all-talking at a time when most talkies featured only short sound segments. While The Cocoanuts wouldn't be the first—that distinction went to The Broadway Melody—its production faced significant hurdles due to the primitive state of sound film technology, which was highly sensitive. Paper props, for example, had to be sprayed with water to prevent microphones from picking up crinkling sounds. Cameras had to be kept in soundproof boxes that limited movement and contributed to a stage-bound style. The production schedule was also challenging for the Marx Brothers, who commuted daily between the Astoria set, where they were filming, and Manhattan, where they performed in evening stage performances of Animal Crackers.

The film's plot largely mirrored the stage play, though substantial cuts were necessary to maintain a manageable runtime. The Cocoanuts premiered in New York in May 1929. Mordaunt Hall of The New York Times offered a generally positive review, noting that "the comedy aroused considerable merriment among the first-night gathering," despite his mixed assessment of the sound quality. Although the brothers themselves were reportedly concerned they'd have to buy back the print, the movie was warmly received by critics outside of New York and proved a significant box office success, influencing the brothers' decision to focus their careers on movies instead of the stage.

The rest of 1929 was difficult for the Marx Brothers. On September 13, during preparation for an Animal Crackers tour, Minnie died. Woollcott, by this time a family friend, wrote a full page obituary in The New Yorker, in which he praised her as having "invented [the brothers]. They were just comics she imagined for her own amusement." In October, the stock market crashed. Harpo and Groucho, who had borrowed heavily to invest, had to liquidate everything they owned.

The Cocoanuts was followed by Animal Crackers (1930). Like The Cocoanuts, Animal Crackers was based on the musical of the same name, and filmed at Astoria Studios. Animal Crackers was a hit, and marked the end of their Broadway careers; after a brief vaudeville tour of their greatest hits (during which Groucho suffered an appendicitis attack and had to be replaced by Zeppo), they moved to Hollywood.

The brothers' film career carried on with a short film that was included in Paramount's twentieth anniversary documentary, The House That Shadows Built (1931), in which they adapted a scene from I'll Say She Is. Their third feature-length film, Monkey Business (1931), was their first movie not based on a stage production. They used two new writers: S.J. Perelman and Will B. Johnstone. After Groucho disapproved of their first draft (reportedly saying "It stinks"), the team enlisted the help of a number of other writers, including Groucho's collaborator Arthur Sheekman; their uncle Al Shean; and Nat Perrin, who introduced himself to Groucho with a forged letter from Moss Hart. Perrin and Groucho would go on to become lifelong friends.

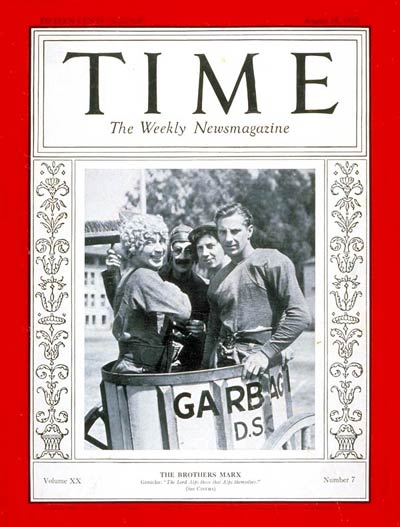
The Marx Brothers on the cover of Time (volume 20 issue 7, August 15, 1932)

The Brothers' next film, Horse Feathers (1932), in which the brothers satirized the American college system and Prohibition, was their most popular film yet, and won them the cover of Time magazine. It included a running gag from their stage work, in which Harpo produces an improbable array of props from inside his coat, including a wooden mallet, a fish, a coiled rope, a tie, a poster of a woman in her underwear, a cup of hot coffee, a sword and (just after Groucho warns him that he "can't burn the candle at both ends") a candle burning at both ends.

During this period Chico and Groucho starred in a radio comedy series, Flywheel, Shyster and Flywheel. Though the series was short lived, much of the material developed for it was used in subsequent films.

Their last Paramount film, Duck Soup (1933), directed by Academy Award winner Leo McCarey, is the highest rated of the five Marx Brothers films on the American Film Institute's "100 years ... 100 Movies" list. It did not do as well financially as Horse Feathers, but was the sixth-highest grosser of 1933. The film sparked a dispute between the Marxes and the village of Fredonia, New York. "Freedonia" was the name of a fictional country in the script, and the city fathers wrote to Paramount and asked the studio to remove all references to Freedonia because "it is hurting our town's image". Groucho fired back a sarcastic retort asking them to change the name of their town, because "it's hurting our picture".

=== 1933–1949: MGM, RKO, and United Artists ===
On March 11, 1933, the Marx Brothers founded a production company, the "International Amalgamated Consolidated Affiliated World Wide Film Productions Company Incorporated, of North Dakota".

After expiration of the Paramount contract, Zeppo left the act to become an agent. He and Gummo went on to build one of the biggest talent agencies in Hollywood, working with the likes of Jack Benny and Lana Turner. Zeppo later became an engineer and inventor. Groucho and Chico performed on radio, and there was talk of returning to Broadway. At a bridge game with Chico, Irving Thalberg began discussing the possibility of the Marxes joining Metro-Goldwyn-Mayer. They signed, now billed in films before the title as "Groucho — Chico — Harpo — Marx Bros", with the same ordering in the cast list.

In contrast with the less-structured, comedy-focused scripts at Paramount, Thalberg insisted on a strong stories that made the brothers more sympathetic characters, interweaving their comedy with romantic plots and non-comic musical numbers, and making sure that their jokes were at the expense of obvious villains. Thalberg also required that their scripts include a "low point", where all seems lost for both the Marxes and the romantic leads. He instituted the innovation of testing the film's script before live audiences before filming began, to perfect the comic timing, and to retain jokes that earned laughs and replace those that did not. Thalberg also restored Harpo's harp solos and Chico's piano solos, which had been omitted from Duck Soup.

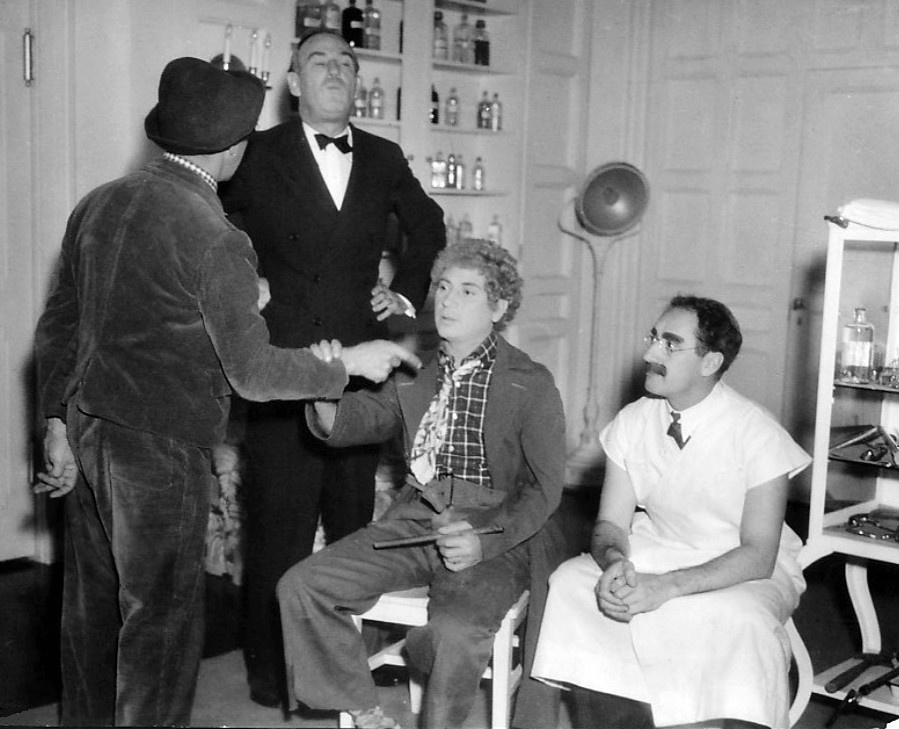
The Marx Brothers on the A Day at the Races set with Sam Wood

The first Marx Brothers/Thalberg film was A Night at the Opera (1935), a satire on the world of opera, where the brothers help two young singers in love by throwing a production of Il Trovatore into chaos. The film, including its famous scene where a large number of people crowd into a tiny stateroom on a ship, was a success. It was followed two years later by an even bigger hit, A Day at the Races (1937), set in a sanitorium and at a horse race, with Groucho portraying a horse doctor masquerading as a real doctor. The film features Groucho and Chico's classic "Tootsie Frootsie Ice Cream" sketch, in which Chico cons Groucho into purchasing a wheelbarrow full of worthless racing tips. In a 1969 interview with Dick Cavett, Groucho said that the two movies made with Thalberg were the best that they ever produced. Thalberg died suddenly on September 14, 1936, two weeks after filming began on A Day at the Races. After his death, the Marxes no longer had an advocate at the studio, and left MGM in 1937.

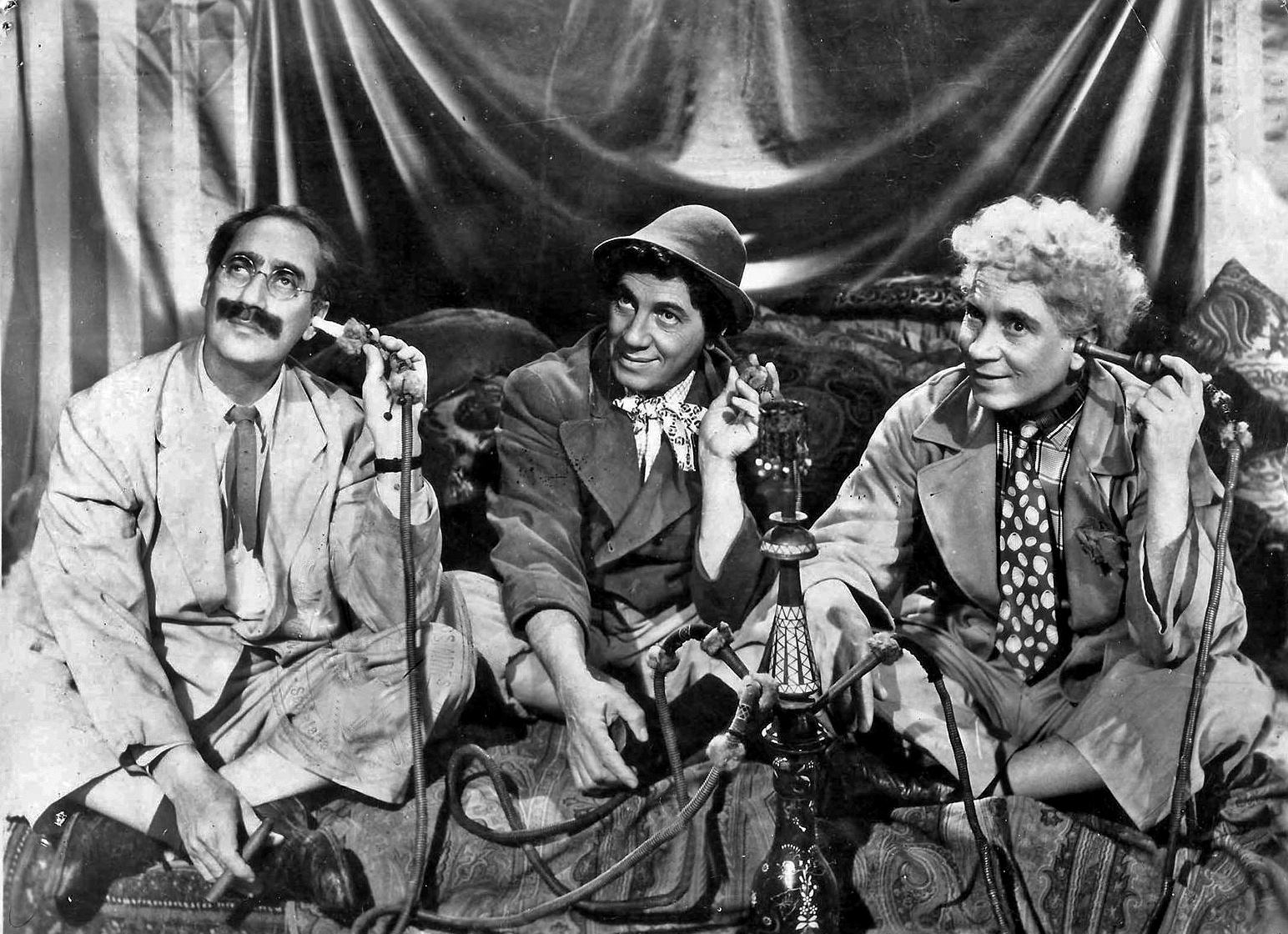
A Night in Casablanca (1946)

After one film for RKO, Room Service (1938), the Marx Brothers returned to MGM and made three more films: At the Circus (1939), Go West (1940) and The Big Store (1941). Prior to the release of The Big Store the team announced they were retiring from the screen. Four years later, however, Chico persuaded his brothers to make A Night in Casablanca (1946) to alleviate his gambling debts. It was the first of two films for United Artists, the second of which, Love Happy (1949), would be the brothers' final film together. Originally intended as a solo vehicle for Harpo, Chico, again in need of money, also ended up in the film. After being informed that financing for the movie couldn't be obtained unless all three Marx Brothers were in it, Groucho reluctantly agreed to appear as well.

=== Later years ===
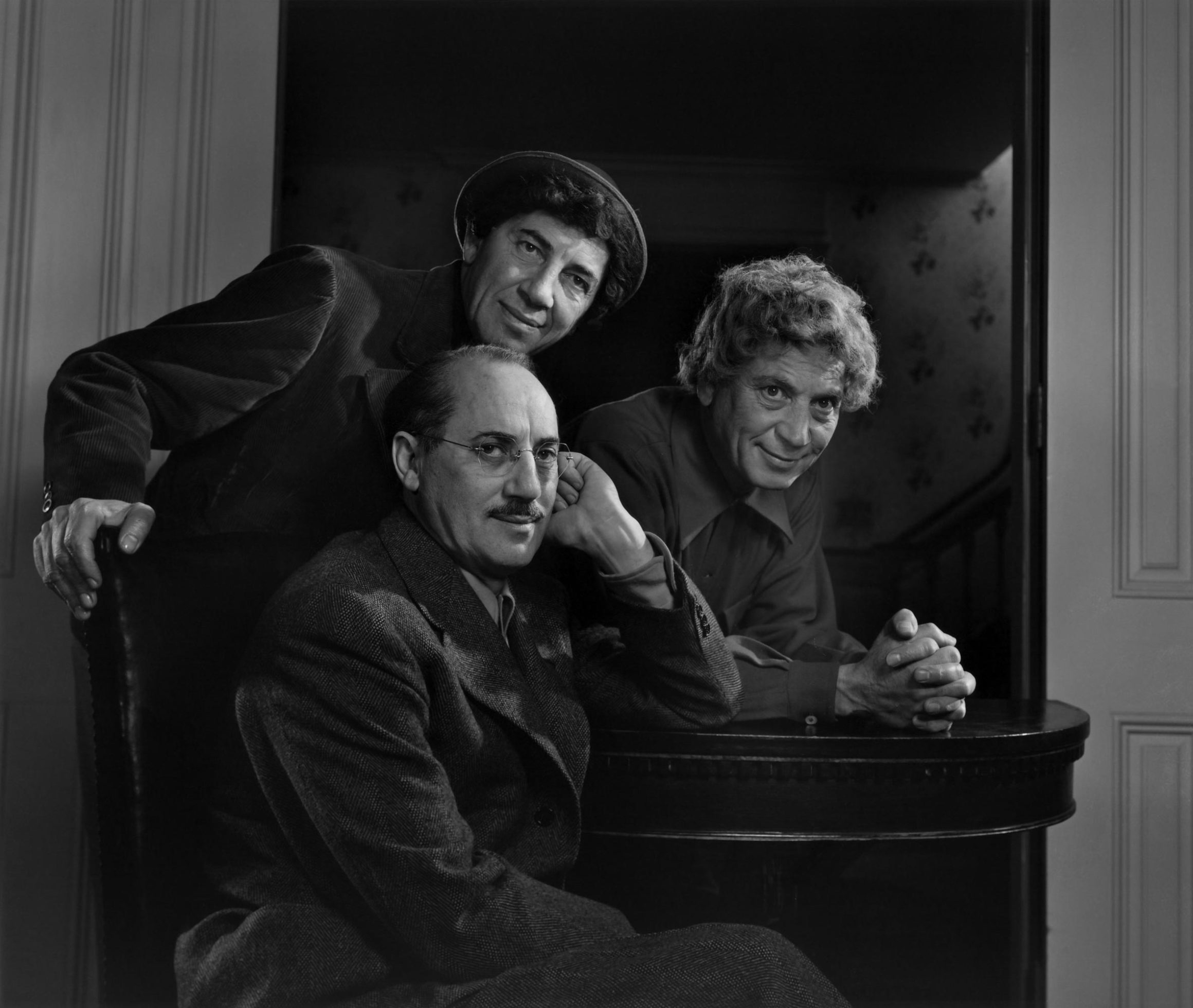
The Three Marx Brothers photo by Yousuf Karsh, 1948

From the 1940s onward Chico and Harpo appeared separately and together in nightclubs and casinos. Chico fronted a big band, the Chico Marx Orchestra (with 17-year-old Mel Tormé as a vocalist). Groucho made several radio appearances during the 1940s and starred in You Bet Your Life, which ran from 1947 to 1961 on NBC radio and television. He authored several books, including Groucho and Me (1959), Memoirs of a Mangy Lover (1964) and The Groucho Letters (1967).

Groucho and Chico briefly appeared in a 1957 color short film promoting The Saturday Evening Post entitled Showdown at Ulcer Gulch, directed by animator Shamus Culhane, Chico's son-in-law. Groucho, Chico, and Harpo worked together (in separate scenes) in The Story of Mankind (1957). In 1959, the three began production of Deputy Seraph, a TV series starring Harpo and Chico as blundering angels, and Groucho (in every third episode) as their boss, the "Deputy Seraph". The project was abandoned when Chico was found to be uninsurable (and incapable of memorizing his lines) due to severe arteriosclerosis. On March 8 of that year, Chico and Harpo starred as bumbling thieves in The Incredible Jewel Robbery, a half-hour pantomimed episode of the General Electric Theater on CBS. Groucho made a cameo appearance (uncredited, because of constraints in his NBC contract) in the last scene, and delivered the only line of dialogue ("We won't talk until we see our lawyer!").

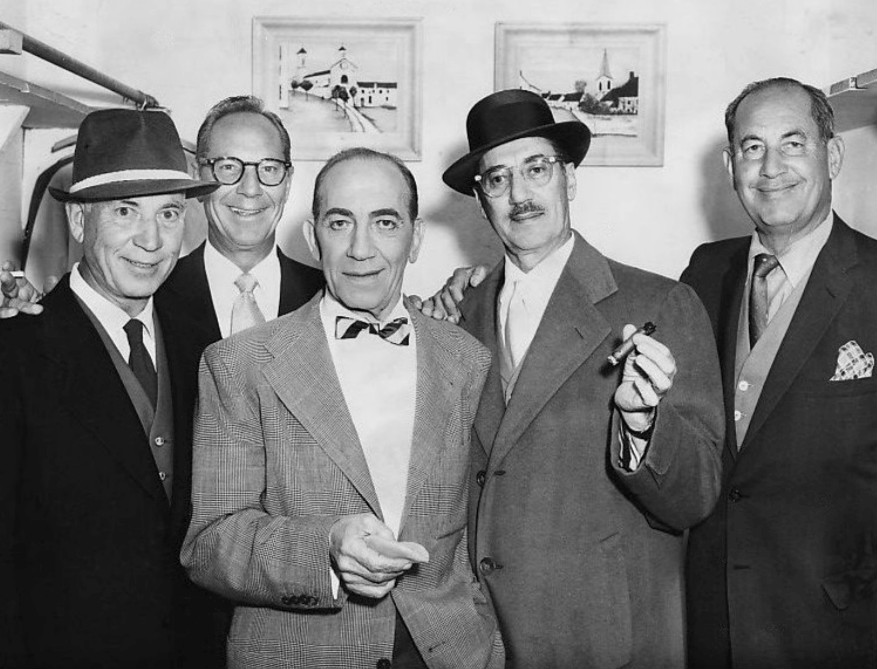
The five brothers, just prior to their only television appearance together, on Tonight! America After Dark, hosted by Jack Lescoulie, February 18, 1957. From left: Harpo, Zeppo, Chico, Groucho, and Gummo.

According to a September 1947 article in Newsweek, Groucho, Harpo, Chico, and Zeppo all signed to appear as themselves in a biographical film entitled The Life and Times of the Marx Brothers. In addition to being a non-fiction biography of the Marxes, the film would have featured the brothers re-enacting much of their previously unfilmed material from both their vaudeville and Broadway eras. The film, had it been made, would have been the first performance by the Brothers as a quartet since 1933.

The five brothers made only one television appearance together, in 1957, on an early incarnation of The Tonight Show called Tonight! America After Dark, hosted by Jack Lescoulie. Five years later (October 1, 1962) after Jack Paar's tenure, Groucho made a guest appearance to introduce the Tonight Show's new host, Johnny Carson.

Around 1960, acclaimed director Billy Wilder considered writing and directing a new Marx Brothers film. Tentatively titled A Day at the U.N., it was to be a comedy of international intrigue set around the United Nations building in New York. Wilder had discussions with Groucho and Gummo, but the project was put on hold because of Harpo's ill health, and abandoned when Chico died on October 11, 1961, from arteriosclerosis, at the age of 74. Harpo died three years later, on September 28, 1964, at the age of 75, following a heart attack one day after heart surgery. With the deaths of Gummo in April 1977, Groucho in August 1977, and Zeppo in November 1979, the brothers were gone.

== Screen and theatrical persona ==
The on-stage personalities of Groucho, Chico, and Harpo were said to have been based on their actual traits.

Zeppo, on the other hand, was considered the funniest brother offstage, despite his straight stage roles. He was the youngest and had grown up watching his brothers, so he could fill in for and imitate any of the others when illness kept them from performing. "He was so good as Captain Spaulding [in Animal Crackers] that I would have let him play the part indefinitely, if they had allowed me to smoke in the audience", Groucho recalled.

The brothers satirized high society and hypocrisy, and they became famous for their improvisational comedy. A famous early instance was when Harpo arranged to chase a fleeing chorus girl across the stage during the middle of a Groucho monologue, to see if Groucho would be thrown off. However, to the audience's delight, Groucho merely reacted by commenting, "First time I ever saw a taxi hail a passenger." When Harpo chased the girl back in the other direction, Groucho calmly checked his watch and ad-libbed, "The 9:20's right on time. You can set your watch by the Lehigh Valley."

Out of their distinctive costumes, the brothers looked similar, even down to their receding hairlines. Zeppo could pass for a younger Groucho and played the role of Groucho's son in Horse Feathers. A scene in Duck Soup finds Groucho, Harpo, and Chico all appearing in Groucho's trademark greasepaint eyebrows, mustache, and round glasses while wearing nightcaps; the three are so similar that they are able to play mirror images of each other.

== Legacy ==
The Marx Brothers continue to influence creators across various artistic disciplines. Admirers have included comedic icons like Jerry Seinfeld and Judd Apatow; avant-garde figures such as Antonin Artaud, and surrealist Salvador Dalí; influential musicians like The Beatles; and literary figures such as Anthony Burgess, J. D. Salinger, and Kurt Vonnegut.

The brothers' iconic images and distinctive personae — Groucho's greasepaint mustache and eyebrows, Chico's Italian accent, and silent Harpo with his curly wig — have been cultural touchpoints since their act first became popular. Caricaturist Al Hirschfeld, whose drawings of the brothers were used to promote A Night at the Opera, and currently hang in the Smithsonian, said of them that they “started to look like the drawing, rather than the other way around.”

=== Contemporary influence ===
The Marx Brothers' influence was quickly felt in popular culture, especially in animation. Early examples include cameos in the Disney cartoons The Bird Store (1932), Mickey's Gala Premier (1932), Mickey's Polo Team (1936), Mother Goose Goes Hollywood (1938) and The Autograph Hound (1939). They also appear in the final cartoon released in the Flip the Frog series, Soda Squirt, in October 1933, alongside other characters such as Buster Keaton, Laurel & Hardy, Mae West, and Jimmy Durante. Tex Avery's cartoon Hollywood Steps Out (1941) features appearances by Harpo and Groucho.

Even when the brothers were not directly depicted, their style had an influence on animators. Dopey in Snow White and the Seven Dwarfs was inspired by Harpo's silent performances. Bugs Bunny's wise-cracking, Brooklyn-accented persona was influenced by Groucho Marx; his creators had him explicitly imitate Groucho in cartoons such as 1947's Slick Hare (with Elmer Fudd appearing as Harpo) and Wideo Wabbit (1956), in which Bugs hosted a Groucho-style TV show.

=== Post-golden age and initial rediscovery ===
The Marx Brothers' comedy continued to be popular after their retirement, spurred on by repeat broadcasts of their movies on television, and Groucho's popularity as host of the quiz show You Bet Your Life.

The 1960s saw several attempts to bring animated versions of the brothers to television. In 1960, the Screen Gems animation studio attempted to develop a stop-motion series called The Three Marx Brothers. Only a short was produced, which was never broadcast. In 1966, Filmation developed a pilot for a Marx Brothers cartoon featuring the voice talents of Pat Harrington Jr. as Groucho, with additional voices by Ted Knight and Joe Besser (formerly of The Three Stooges). Again, the pilot was not developed into a series.

In 1970, Rankin-Bass produced the animated television special The Mad, Mad, Mad Comedians, featuring segments with animated versions of the Marx Brothers. The special included a scene adapted from their Broadway play I'll Say She Is, which was never filmed live. Groucho provided his own voice for the production, while voice actor Paul Frees performed as Chico (who had died in 1961) and Zeppo (who had left show business in 1933).

=== Resurgence in the 1960s and 1970s ===
In the 1960s and 1970s, the Marx Brothers found a new audience among the Baby Boom generation. Duck Soup, which satirized war and politics, was rediscovered and popularized by college aged protesters during the Vietnam War.

Renewed interest led to a greater presence across media. Groucho developed a friendship with television host Dick Cavett, appearing on his program five times. The brothers' vaudeville years and relationship with their mother were chronicled in the 1970 Broadway musical Minnie's Boys, written by Groucho's son Arthur Marx. Although it was not a financial success - closing after 80 performances, and losing an estimated $750,000 on an investment of $550,000 - Lewis Stadlen, who played Groucho, won both the 1970 Theatre World Award and 1970 Drama Desk Award for Outstanding Performance in a Musical.

The resurgence of interest in the brothers culminated in 1974 with the re-release of their 1930 film Animal Crackers, following a letter-writing campaign. Animal Crackers had previously been withheld from distribution due to copyright issues. Screenings were mobbed, and when Groucho attended the New York premiere, a near-riot broke out and a police escort was summoned.

References to the Marx Brothers appeared frequently in television programs and films of the era. Characters in M*A*S*H imitated the brothers, with Alan Alda's character particularly known for his Groucho impressions. In All in the Family, Rob Reiner and Sally Struthers appeared dressed as Groucho and Harpo in one episode. An episode of The Mary Tyler Moore Show featured a storyline about the song "Hooray for Captain Spaulding" being cut from a broadcast of Animal Crackers. In The Way We Were (1973), the main characters attend a costume party dressed as the Marx Brothers.

Gabe Kaplan, star of ABC's Welcome Back, Kotter, worked references to the Marx Brothers into that show and his subsequent work. The main characters in Kotter —including those played by John Travolta and Robert Hegyes—based much of their comedic style on the brothers, with star Gabe Kaplan frequently performing Groucho impressions. Kaplan later starred in a play about Groucho, which was, in turn turned into a television movie.

It was also at this time that Woody Allen, a devoted fan, began referencing the brothers in his films. In Take the Money and Run (1969), characters wear Groucho masks during an interview scene. Allen begins Annie Hall (1977) with a Groucho Marx joke. In Manhattan (1979), one character lists the Marx Brothers among his character's reasons for living. The title of his 1996 film, Everyone Says I Love You, is a direct reference to a song from Horse Feathers. The film itself includes a musical number where a chorus of Groucho impersonators performs "Hooray for Captain Spaulding", Groucho's signature song, in French. Most significantly, in Hannah and Her Sisters (1986), Allen's character finds renewed purpose in life after watching a revival showing of Duck Soup.

Musicians of the time also included references to the comedy team in their work. Rock band Queen named two of their albums after Marx Brothers films: A Night at the Opera (1975) and A Day at the Races (1976), in a direct acknowledgment of their admiration for the comedians' work. English punk band The Damned named their 1980 single "There Ain't No Sanity Clause" after a famous line from A Night at the Opera. The band Sparks was originally named "The Sparks Brothers" as a reference to the Marx Brothers, a connection later acknowledged in Edgar Wright's documentary The Sparks Brothers. Belgian singer Jacques Brel's 1967 song "Le Gaz" was inspired by the famous stateroom scene in A Night at the Opera.

The brothers' cultural significance extended to album artwork. Groucho appeared on the cover of Alice Cooper's Greatest Hits, and Harpo was depicted on the cover of The Kinks' 1972 album Everybody's in Show-Biz.

The second act of the Broadway musical A Day in Hollywood/A Night in the Ukraine (1980) was a Marx Brothers-styled adaptation of Anton Chekhov's play The Bear. The original Broadway production won two Tony Awards and ran for 588 performances.

Commercial enterprises also drew inspiration from the brothers. In 1974, Vlasic Pickles introduced a stork mascot that mimicked Groucho's mannerisms, holding a pickle the way Groucho held his cigar and speaking in a similar style. This mascot remains in use to the present day.

=== Influence in the late 20th century and beyond ===
Comedians and filmmakers continue to reference the brothers' work. Brazil (1985) features a scene where a woman watches The Cocoanuts before her home is invaded. In Twelve Monkeys (1996), asylum inmates watch Monkey Business on television. The 1992 film Brain Donors, produced by David Zucker and Jerry Zucker, was inspired by the Marx Brothers films A Day at the Races and A Night at the Opera, with John Turturro, Mel Smith, and Bob Nelson performing in roles loosely based on Groucho, Chico, and Harpo.

Their influence continues in animation, as well. In Disney's Aladdin, Robin Williams referenced the brothers in his performance as the Genie, and later cited Groucho as a comedic influence. Animaniacs and Tiny Toons – two contemporary animated series – featured Marx Brothers-inspired comedy segments.

The Marxes' images are regularly used across a variety of media, especially when the creators wish to portray the absurdity of what they are describing. In 1990, the British satirical television program Spitting Image created puppet caricatures of Groucho, Harpo, and Chico. These puppets later appeared as the hunters in a 1994 television production of Peter and the Wolf, narrated by Sting. The epic graphic novel Cerebus the Aardvark by Dave Sim features characters named Lord Julius and Duke Leonardi, based respectively on Groucho and Chico's stage personae.

In recent decades, the brothers' theatrical legacy has been revived through stage productions of their work and shows inspired by their comedic style. Their Broadway shows The Cocoanuts and Animal Crackers continue to be performed by theater companies internationally. In 2016, theater historians Noah Diamond and Amanda Sisk presented a reconstructed version of I'll Say She Is off-Broadway. This production represented the culmination of years of research to recover and restore that musical, which had never been filmed, and for which no complete script had survived. The New York Times described the restoration as "delightful," while noting the challenges inherent in recreating the brothers' distinctive performance style.

Comedian Frank Ferrante has made a career out of interpretations of the Groucho character, starring in productions of The Cocoanuts and Animal Crackers. Since 1985, he has toured in a one-man show entitled An Evening with Groucho, which was broadcast by PBS in 2022.

The radio program Flywheel, Shyster, and Flywheel, which originally starred Groucho and Chico, has been adapted multiple times. The show's scripts were believed lost until they were found in the Library of Congress in the 1980s. After publication, they were performed by Marx Brothers impersonators for BBC Radio. In 2010, The Most Ridiculous Thing You Ever Hoid, based on the same radio show, debuted as part of the New York Musical Theatre Festival, and received excellent reviews.

== Awards and honors ==
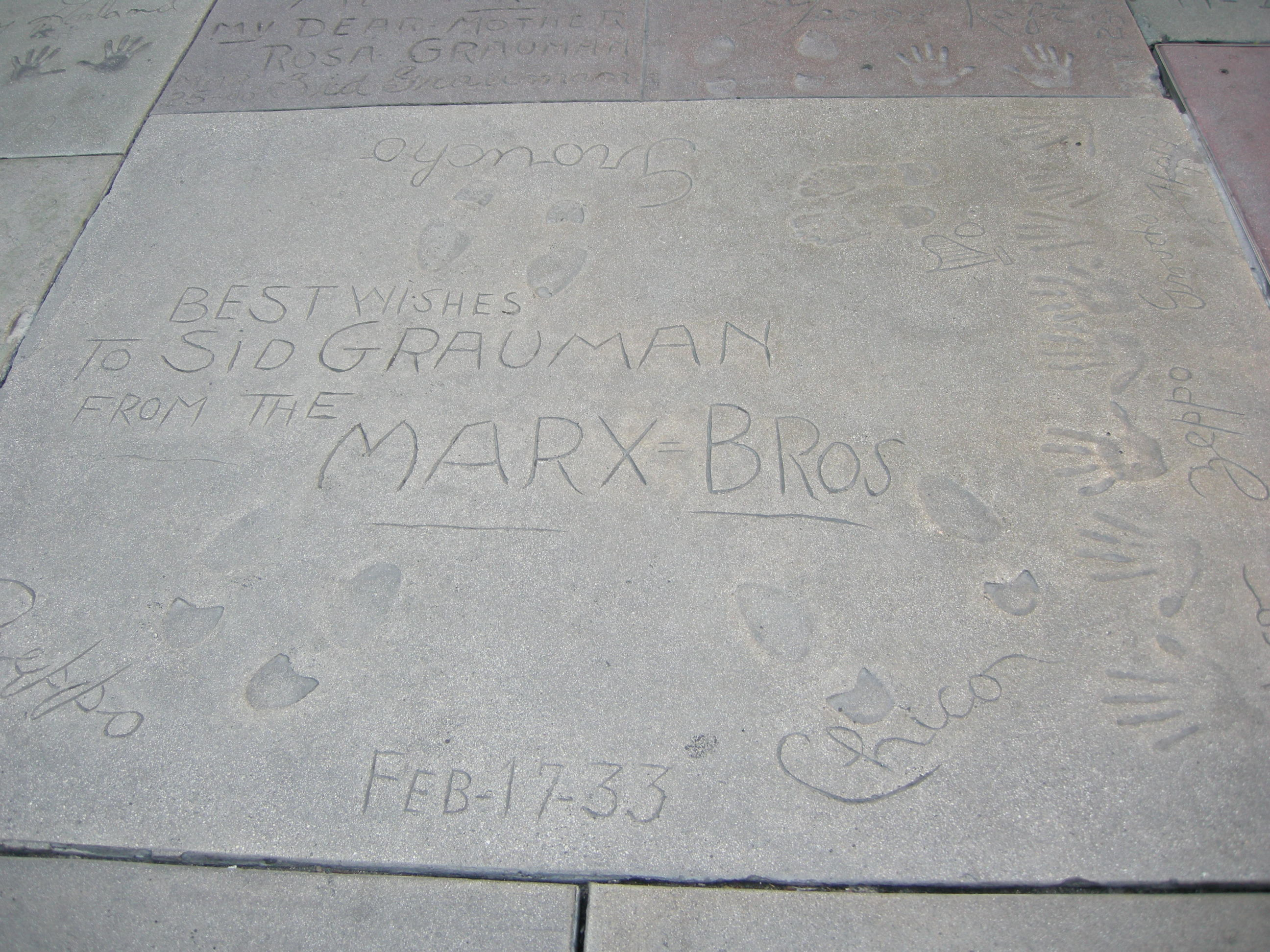
Chico, Groucho, Harpo, and Zeppo's block in the forecourt of Grauman's Chinese Theatre.

In February 1933, Chico, Groucho, Harpo, and Zeppo Marx were invited to place their handprints and signatures in cement in the forecourt of Grauman's Chinese Theatre in Hollywood.

In the 1974 Academy Awards telecast, Jack Lemmon presented Groucho with an honorary Academy Award to a standing ovation. The award was also on behalf of Harpo, Chico, and Zeppo (who was in attendance), whom Lemmon mentioned by name. It was one of Groucho's final major public appearances. "I wish that Harpo and Chico could be here to share with me this great honor", he said, naming the two deceased brothers. Groucho also praised the late Margaret Dumont as a great straight woman who never understood any of his jokes.

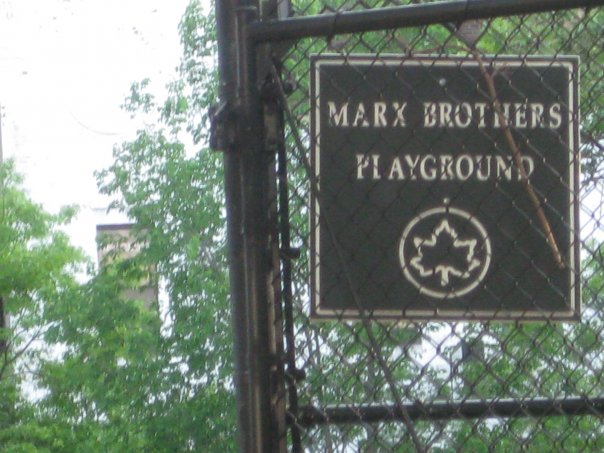
Marx Brothers playground in New York, New York.

In 1999, the American Film Institute included the Marx Brothers on their list of Top 25 American male screen legends, naming them collectively as No. 20 on the list of the top 25 American male screen legends of Classic Hollywood cinema. They are the only group to be honored on this list, which otherwise exclusively recognized individual performers.

The Library of Congress has included two Marx Brothers films in the National Film Registry for their "cultural, historical, or aesthetic significance." Duck Soup was selected in 1990 and A Night at the Opera in 1993.

== Theater ==
Only productions with more than one of the brothers are listed here. Promotional tours for their movies are omitted. For more information about their solo credits, consult their individual pages.

Production	Dates	Groucho	Chico	Harpo	Gummo	Zeppo
Ned Wayburn's Nightingales / The Three Nightingales	May 1907 – April 1908	Julius	—N/a	—N/a	Milton	—N/a
The Four Nightingales	June 1908 – November 1909	Julius	—N/a	Adolph	Milton	—N/a
The Six Mascots / The Mascot Musical Comedy Company	December 1909 – June 1910	Julius	—N/a	Adolph	Milton	—N/a
Julius Marx's School Kids	November 1910	Julius	—N/a	Adolph	Milton	—N/a
Minnie Palmer and Her Seven Happy Youngsters	December 1910	Julius	—N/a	Adolph	Milton	—N/a
Fun in High School	January 1911 – August 1912	Herr Teacher	—N/a	Patsy	Izzy	—N/a
Mr. Green's Reception	September 1912 – June 1913	Herman Green	Tony Saroni	Patsy Brannigan	Hans Pumpernickel	—N/a
Fun in Hi Skool / Mr. Green's Reception	July 1913 – June 1914	Herman Green	Tony Caponi	Patsy Brannigan	Hans Pumpernickel	—N/a
Home Again	September 1914 – June 1918	Henry Schneider / Henry Jones (Note: The change from Schneider to Jones happened in response to anti-German sentiment during World War I.)	Tony Saroni	The Nondescript	Harold Schneider / Harold Jones	—N/a
The Cinderella Girl	September 1918	Julius	Leonard	Arthur	—N/a	Herbert
Home Again / 'N' Everything	November 1918 – February 1919	Henry Hammer	Chico Saroni	The Nondescript	—N/a	Harold Hammer
'N' Everything	February 1919 – January 1921	Henry Hammer	Chico Saroni	The Nondescript	—N/a	Harold Hammer
On The Mezzanine Floor / On The Balcony	February 1921 – September 1922	Henry Hammer	Chico	Harpo	—N/a	Quinine "Bobby" Hammer
The Twentieth Century Revue	October 1922 – March 1923	Julius	Leonard	Arthur	—N/a	Herbert
I'll Say She Is	May 1923 – June 1925	Lawyer / Napoleon	Poor Man / Alphonse	Beggar Man / Gaston	—N/a	Merchant / Francois
The Cocoanuts	October 1925 – February 1928	Henry W. Schlemmer	Willie	Silent Sam	—N/a	Jamison
Animal Crackers	September 1928 – April 1930	Captain Spalding	Emanuel Ravelli	The Professor	—N/a	Jamison
The Schweinerei	October 1930 – February 1931	Groucho	Chico	Harpo	—N/a	Zeppo
Napoleon's Return	October 1931 – January 1932	Groucho	Chico	Harpo	—N/a	Zeppo

== Filmography ==
Only productions with more than one of the brothers are listed here. For more information about their solo credits, consult their individual pages.

Film	Director	Year	Groucho	Chico	Harpo	Zeppo
Humor Risk	Dick Smith	1921	Unknown	Unknown	Unknown	Unknown
The Cocoanuts	Robert Florey, Joseph Santley	1929	Mr. Hammer	Chico	Harpo	Jamison
Animal Crackers	Victor Heerman	1930	Captain Geoffrey T. Spaulding	Signor Emmanuel Ravelli	The Professor	Horatio Jamison
The House That Shadows Built	Adolph Zukor, Jesse L. Lasky	1931	Caesar's Ghost	Tomalio	The Merchant of Weiners	Sammy Brown
Monkey Business	Norman Z. McLeod	1931	Groucho	Chico	Harpo	Zeppo
Horse Feathers	Norman Z. McLeod	1932	Professor Quincy Adams Wagstaff	Baravelli	Pinky	Frank Wagstaff
Duck Soup	Leo McCarey	1933	Rufus T. Firefly	Chicolini	Pinky	Lt. Bob Roland
A Night at the Opera	Sam Wood	1935	Otis B. Driftwood	Fiorello	Tomasso	—N/a
A Day at the Races	Sam Wood	1937	Dr. Hugo Z. Hackenbush	Tony	Stuffy	—N/a
Room Service	William A. Seiter	1938	Gordon Miller	Harry Binelli	Faker Englund	—N/a
At the Circus	Edward Buzzell	1939	J. Cheever Loophole	Antonio Pirelli	Punchy	—N/a
Go West	Edward Buzzell	1940	S. Quentin Quale	Joe Panello	Rusty Panello	—N/a
The Big Store	Charles Reisner	1941	Wolf J. Flywheel	Ravelli	Wacky	—N/a
A Night in Casablanca	Archie Mayo	1946	Ronald Kornblow	Corbaccio	Rusty	—N/a
Love Happy	David Miller	1949	Sam Grunion	Faustino the Great	Harpo	—N/a
The Story of Mankind	Irwin Allen	1957	Peter Minuit	Monk	Sir Isaac Newton	—N/a
"The Incredible Jewel Robbery" (episode of General Electric Theater)	Mitchell Leisen	1959	Suspect in a police lineup	Nick	Harry	—N/a

== Bibliography ==
Memoirs

- Marx, Groucho, Beds (1930) Farrar & Rinehart; (1976) Bobbs-Merrill
- Marx, Groucho, Many Happy Returns (1942), Simon & Schuster
- Marx, Arthur, Life with Groucho (1954) Simon & Schuster (revised as My Life with Groucho: A Son's Eye View, 1988), ISBN 0-330-31132-8
- Marx, Groucho (1959). Groucho and Me. Random House. ISBN 0-306-80666-5.
- Marx, Harpo; Barber, Rowland (1961). Harpo Speaks. New York: Limelight Editions. ISBN 978-0-87910-036-0.
- Marx, Groucho, Memoirs of a Mangy Lover (1963) Bernard Geis Associates, (2002) Da Capo Press ISBN 0-306-81104-9
- Marx, Groucho, The Groucho Letters: Letters from and to Groucho Marx (1967, 2007), Simon & Schuster ISBN 0-306-80607-X
- Marx, Arthur, Son of Groucho (1972), David McKay Co. ISBN 0-679-50355-2
- Marx, Groucho (1976). The Groucho Phile. Bobbs-Merrill Co. ISBN 0883654334.
- Marx, Groucho (with Arce, Hector), The Secret Word Is GROUCHO (1976), G.P. Putnam's Sons
- Marx, Maxine (1980). Growing Up with Chico. Prentice-Hall. ISBN 087910-059-1.
- Allen, Miriam Marx, Love, Groucho: Letters from Groucho Marx to His Daughter Miriam (1992), Faber & Faber, ISBN 0-571-12915-3

Biography

- Crichton, Kyle, The Marx Brothers (1950), Doubleday & Co.
- Zimmerman, Paul D., The Marx Brothers at the Movies (1968), G.P. Putnam's Sons
- Eyles, Allen, The Marx Brothers: Their World of Comedy (1969) A.S. Barnes
- Robinson, David, The Great Funnies: A History of Film Comedy (1969) E.P. Dutton
- Durgnat, Raymond, "Four Against Alienation" from The Crazy Mirror: Hollywood Comedy and the American Image (1970) Dell
- Maltin, Leonard, Movie Comedy Teams (1970, revised 1985) New American Library
- Anobile, Richard J. (1971). Why a Duck?: Visual and Verbal Gems from the Marx Brothers Movies. Avon Books. ISBN 028970-285-2.
- Bergman, Andrew, "Some Anarcho-Nihilist Laff Riots" from We're in the Money: Depression America and Its Films (1971) New York University Press
- Adamson, Joe, Groucho, Harpo, Chico and Sometimes Zeppo (1973, 1983) Simon & Schuster
- Kalmar, Bert, and Perelman, S. J., The Four Marx Brothers in Monkey Business and Duck Soup (Classic Film Scripts) (1973) Simon & Schuster
- Mast, Gerald, The Comic Mind: Comedy and the Movies (1973, 2nd ed. 1979) University of Chicago Press
- McCaffrey, Donald W., "Zanies in a Stage-Movieland" from The Golden Age of Sound Comedy (1973) A. S. Barnes
- Anobile, Richard J. (ed.), Hooray for Captain Spaulding!: Verbal and Visual Gems from Animal Crackers (1974) Avon Books
- Anobile, Richard J. (1974). The Marx Bros. Scrapbook. Grosset & Dunlap. ISBN 9780060972653.
- Wolf, William, The Marx Brothers (1975) Pyramid Library
- Byron, Stuart and Weis, Elizabeth (eds.), The National Society of Film Critics on Movie Comedy (1977) Grossman/Viking
- Maltin, Leonard, The Great Movie Comedians (1978) Crown Publishers
- Arce, Hector, Groucho (1979) G. P. Putnam's Sons
- Chandler, Charlotte, Hello, I Must Be Going: Groucho & His Friends (1978) Doubleday & Co., (2007) Simon & Schuster ISBN 0-14-005222-4
- Weales, Gerald, Canned Goods as Caviar: American Film Comedy of the 1930s (1985) University of Chicago Press
- Gehring, Wes D., The Marx Brothers: A Bio-Bibliography (1987) Greenwood Press
- Barson, Michael (ed.), Flywheel, Shyster and Flywheel: The Marx Brothers Lost Radio Show (1988) Pantheon Books
- Eyles, Allen, The Complete Films of the Marx Brothers (1992) Carol Publishing Group
- Gehring, Wes D., Groucho and W.C. Fields: Huckster Comedians (1994) University Press of Mississippi
- Stoliar, Steve, Raised Eyebrows: My Years Inside Groucho's House (1996) General Publishing Group ISBN 1-881649-73-3
- Dwan, Robert, As Long As They're Laughing!: Groucho Marx and You Bet Your Life (2000) Midnight Marquee Press, Inc.
- Kanfer, Stefan (2000). Groucho: The Life and Times of Julius Henry Marx. Alfred A. Knopf. ISBN 0-375-70207-5.
- Bego, Mark, The Marx Brothers (2001) Pocket Essentials
- Louvish, Simon (2000). Monkey Business: The Lives and Legends of the Marx Brothers. New York: St. Martin's Press. ISBN 978-0-312-25292-2.
- Gehring, Wes D., Film Clowns of the Depression (2007) McFarland & Co.
- Keesey, Douglas, with Duncan, Paul (ed.), Marx Bros. (2007) Movie Icons series, Taschen
- Mitchell, Glenn (2012). The Marx Brothers Encyclopedia (3rd ed.). Titan Books. ISBN 9780857687784.
- DesRochers, Rick (2014). "Chapter 1. The vaudeville aesthetic and the migration to radio and television". The Comic Offense from Vaudeville to Contemporary Comedy : Larry David, Tina Fey, Stephen Colbert, and Dave Chappelle. Bloomsbury Academic. doi:10.5040/9781501300172.ch-001. "oclc881429670"
- Diamond, Noah (2016). Gimme a Thrill: The Story of I'll Say She Is, the Lost Marx Brothers Musical, and How it Was Found. Duncan, OK: BearManor Media. ISBN 978-1593939335.
- Salah, Shaki (2018). Marx Brothers' & W.C. Fields' Comedy: Violence, change, survival. Master I Film- og Fjernsynsvitenskap (Master thesis). Høgskolen i Innlandet. hdl:11250/2575126. "DSpace Master thesis"
- Bader, Robert S. (September 15, 2022). Four of the Three Musketeers: The Marx Brothers on Stage. Northwestern University Press. ISBN 978-0-8101-4575-7.
