= A Night in Casablanca =

1946 Marx Brothers film directed by Archie Mayo

- Lobby card
- Directed by: Archie Mayo
- Written by: Joseph Fields; Roland Kibbee; Frank Tashlin
- Produced by: David L. Loew
- Starring: Groucho Marx; Harpo Marx; Chico Marx; Charles Drake
- Cinematography: James Van Trees
- Edited by: Gregg G. Tallas
- Music by: Bert Kalmar; Harry Ruby; Werner Janssen
- Production company: Loma Vista Productions
- Distributed by: United Artists
- Release date: May 10, 1946
- Running time: 85 minutes
- Country: United States
- Language: English

A Night in Casablanca is a 1946 American comedy film directed by Archie Mayo and starring the Marx Brothers (Groucho, Harpo, and Chico). The screenplay was written by Joseph Fields and Roland Kibbee. It was an independent production released by United Artists. The cast also features actress and singer Lisette Verea. The villain is portrayed by Sig Ruman, who had roles in the earlier Marx Brothers films A Night at the Opera (1935) and A Day at the Races (1937).

== Plot ==
Set in Casablanca shortly after World War II, escaped Nazi war criminal Heinrich Stubel has steadily murdered three managers of the Hotel Casablanca. Disguised as a Count Pfefferman, Stubel's goal is to reclaim the stolen art treasures that he has hidden in the hotel. However, the only way he can do this undetected is by murdering the hotel's managers and running the hotel himself.

The newest manager of Hotel Casablanca is former motel proprietor Ronald Kornblow, who is very much unaware that he has been hired because no one else will dare take the position. Inept Kornblow takes charge of the hotel, and eventually crosses paths with Corbaccio, owner of the Yellow Camel company, who appoints himself as Kornblow's bodyguard, aided and abetted by Stubel's valet Rusty. In his many efforts to murder Kornblow, Stubel sends beautiful Beatrice Reiner to romance the clueless manager.

As manager, Kornblow allows Rusty to make a roulette bet (three 5s in a row) that could bankrupt the hotel. Rusty wins and Stubel uses this to convince the Governor and police to arrest Kornblow, Corbaccio and Rusty on conspiracy. Stubel is then appointed hotel manager.

Kornblow, Corbaccio and Rusty are thrown in prison. Rusty reveals he found the treasure earlier and all three men, plus hotel secretary Annette, break out of prison to try and stop Stubel from leaving with the treasure.

Before Stubel can make his escape to the airfield with the loot, Kornblow, Corbaccio, Rusty and Beatrice invade his hotel room and sneak from suitcase to closet and back again to unpack his bags, which serves to drive him thoroughly mad. Stubel flees the hotel, but Kornblow, Corbaccio and Rusty follow and crash Stubel's plane into a police station where the brothers expose Stubel as an escaped Nazi.

== Cast ==
- Groucho Marx as Ronald Kornblow
- Harpo Marx as Rusty
- Chico Marx as Corbaccio
- Charles Drake as Lieutenant Pierre Delmar
- Lois Collier as Annette Bernard
- Sig Ruman as Count Max Pfefferman alias Heinrich Stubel
- Lisette Verea as Beatrice Reiner
- Lewis L. Russell as Governor Gandaloux
- Dan Seymour as Prefect of Police Captain Brizzard
- Frederick Giermann as Kurt
- Harro Mellor as Emile
- David Hoffman as Spy
- Paul Harvey as Mr. Smythe

== Legal stunt ==
A popular story (spread in part by Groucho himself) surrounding the movie is that the Marx Brothers were threatened with a lawsuit by Warner Bros. for the use of the word "Casablanca" in the film's title due to it being an infringement on the company's rights to the 1942 film Casablanca. Groucho responded with a letter asserting that he and his siblings had use of the word "brothers" prior to the establishment of Warner Brothers (and many others had before that), and often the story is told that Groucho threatened a counter-suit based on this assertion. He also mentioned that he would consider further legal action by pointing out to Warners that the title of their current hit film Night and Day infringed on the titles of two Marx Brothers films released by MGM: A Night at the Opera and A Day at the Races.

The true story is that the original storyline for the film was intended to be a direct parody of Casablanca, with the characters having similar-sounding names to the characters and actors in the 1942 film. Groucho Marx said that an early draft named his character "Humphrey Bogus", a reference to the leading actor in Casablanca, Humphrey Bogart. Warner Bros. did not litigate, nor threaten to litigate. However, the studio issued a formal inquiry to the Marx Brothers concerning the plot and script of the film.

The Marx Brothers exploited the situation for publicity, making it appear to the public that a frivolous lawsuit was in the works, and Groucho sent several open letters to Warner Bros. to get newspaper coverage. These letters were among those he donated to the Library of Congress, and he reprinted them in his 1967 book The Groucho Letters. There is no evidence that Warner Bros. ever responded to any of Groucho's letters.

Producer David Loew told the Hollywood Reporter that he had reached an arbitration agreement with Warner Bros. to use the title Adventures in Casablanca. The film was eventually retitled A Night in Casablanca. The Brothers publicized the name change and released advertisements with a list of different "Casablanca" titles such as "'It Happened One Night in Casablanca' or Anything the Mayors of Casablanca Warner Brothers will permit."

Ultimately, the matter ended without legal action, and the storyline of the film was changed to be a send-up of the genre rather than Casablanca specifically.

== Production ==
The movie was shot under the title Adventures in Casablanca before being re-titled A Night in Casablanca. Some exterior scenes were shot in Palm Springs, California.

=== Critical reviews ===
Writing in The Nation in 1946, critic James Agee commented, " ... it isn't one of their best movies; for the worst they might ever make would be better worth seeing than most other things I can think of. Many of the things in this one which by substance and look should be level with their best fall somehow flat. The only two reasons I can get wind of are the manufacture of repetition and the fact—they work too well for it to show obviously—that after all these years the Brothers are tired. But to anyone who likes them much I don't think that will get in the way ... Only a mash-note ... could contain my regard for Groucho. He is not, I suppose, one of the great comedians, but I can't think of anyone who has given me greater pleasure. My only regret is that, so far as I have seen, he has never yet been in a position to use everything I think he has...Groucho, working with extremely sophisticated wit rather than with comedy, has always been slowed and burdened by his audience, even on the stage. He needs an audience that could catch the weirdest curves he could throw ... "
