= Nazi ghost train =

1944 train intended to transport prisoners

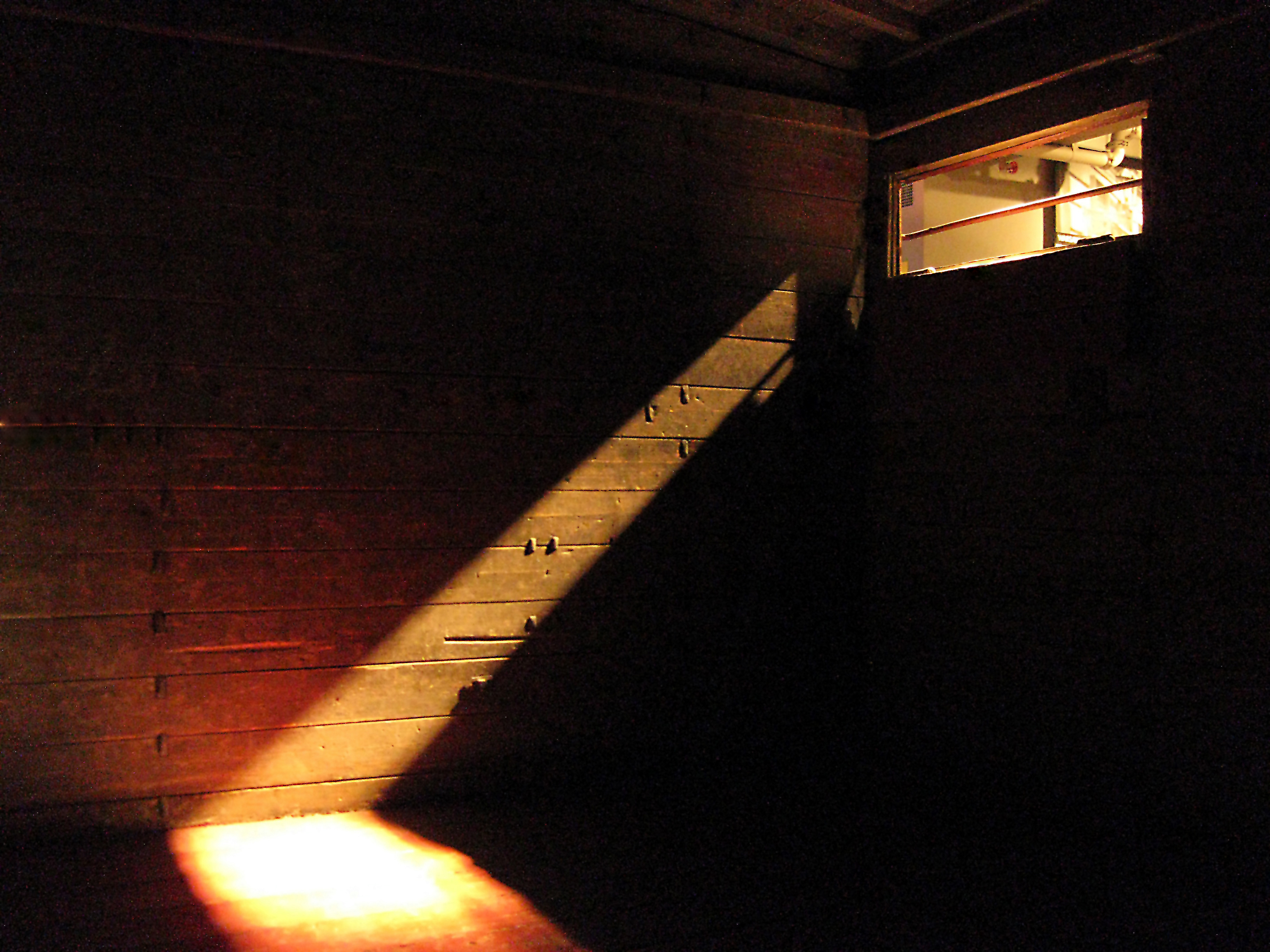
Replica of a Holocaust train boxcar used by Nazi Germany to transport prisoners

The Nazi ghost train, also known as the phantom train, is the common name for a train that, at the beginning of September 1944, was intended to transport 1,600 political prisoners and Allied prisoners of war (POWs) held at Saint-Gilles prison in Brussels, to concentration camps in Germany. The fall of Brussels to the allied armies was imminent and the departure of the train was delayed and progress slowed by sabotage and deserting Belgian railway workers. The train had only traveled about 30 km (19 miles) out of Brussels when it was ordered to return. The Germans needed all transport to evacuate their troops from Brussels. Swedish and Swiss diplomats negotiated the release of the political prisoners. The POWs escaped in the chaos of the German flight from Brussels. The full story is told in the Sunday Times bestselling book The Nazi Ghost Train (2026) by Greg Lewis.

== Background ==
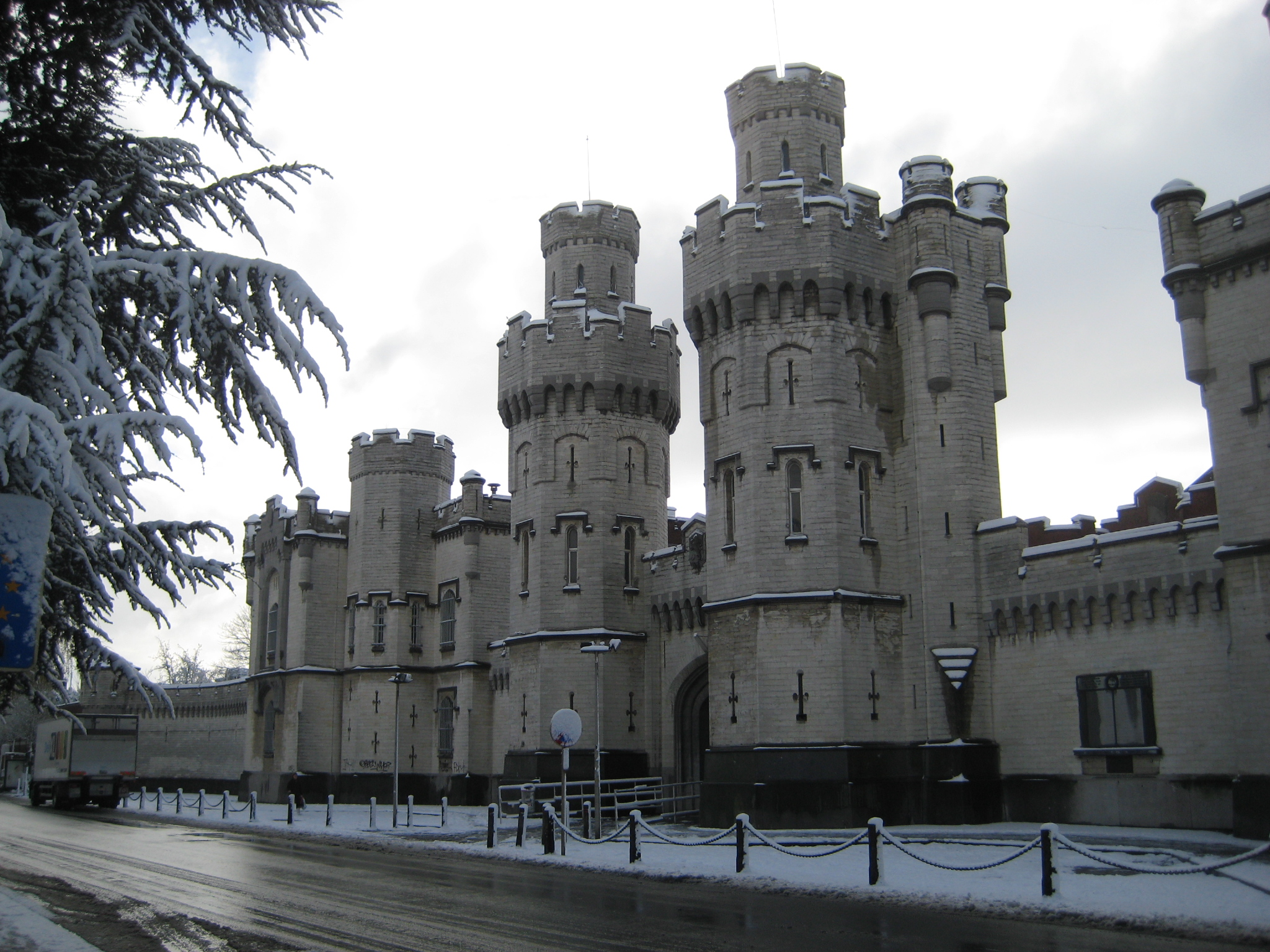
Saint-Gilles Prison

In 1944 Belgian prisons were over-crowded due to arrests of persons resisting the German occupation of the country. More than 5,000 prisoners (including more than 300 women) were transported out of Belgium to concentration camps in Germany prior to the Nazi ghost train. By early September 1944, 1,538 political prisoners and fifty-three allied airmen shot down and taken prisoner were incarcerated in Saint-Gilles Prison in Brussels. The nationalities of the prisoners included Belgians, French, Russians, Americans, Canadians, and British.

The British army was approaching Brussels and it was obvious that the city would soon fall to the Allies. At the same time that the Germans were planning to send the prisoners to Germany the German army was abandoning Brussels.

On 25 August representatives of the consular section of Swedish Embassy and of the International Red Cross met and decided to attempt to persuade the Germans to release the political prisoners in Saint-Gilles prison. On 28 August the diplomats held another meeting at the Swiss Legation and prepared a paper to present to the German Ambassador requesting the release. The Swedish Consul met with the German Ambassador that same day and presented the paper. The German Ambassador agreed to bring the paper to the attention of the SS leader in Belgium. The SS response was vague but said that the prisoners who had committed serious offenses could not be released.

== Aborted deportation ==
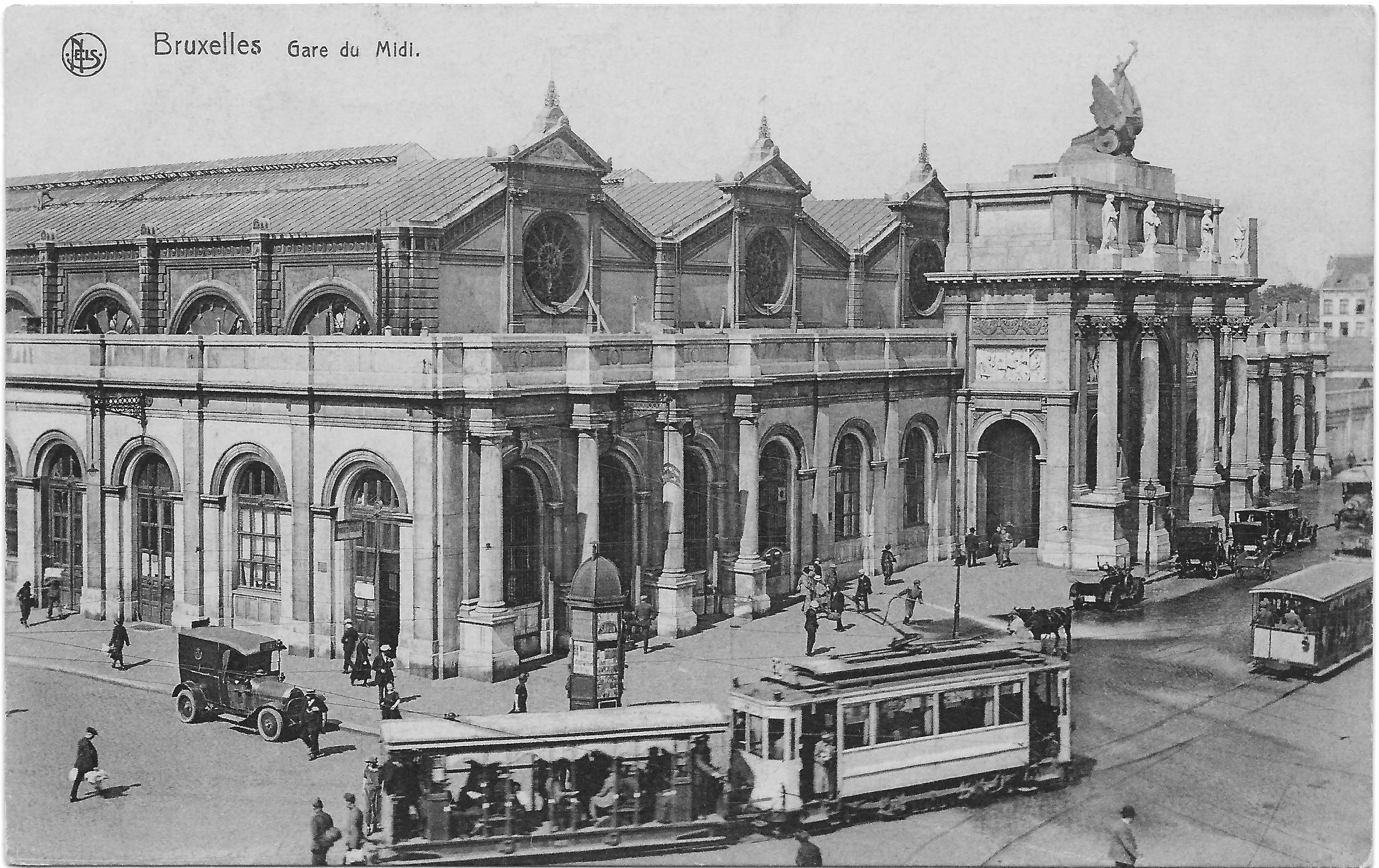
Brussels Midi Railway station, 1927

Without the knowledge of the diplomats, the Germans were organizing the deportation of the political prisoners and POWs. During the nights of 1 and 2 September they collected 32 cattle cars and lined them up on the railroad tracks at the Brussels midi railway station. In the early morning of 2 September the prisoners at Saint-Gilles were assembled, loaded in lorries, and driven into the railway station. Each was given two Red Cross food parcels and loaded onto the cattle cars, which were so crowded that the prisoners could not sit down.

Two Belgian officials of the railway station, Michel Petit (a member of the Belgian Resistance to the German occupation) and his namesake Leon Petit, plus members of the resistance decided to prevent the transport of the prisoners. They sabotaged and diverted locomotives. Engineers to drive the locomotives disappeared or were "injured," and repairs were necessary. Not until 4:50 did the train leave the station with the prisoners and more than 150 German SS soldiers. After its departure the train was further delayed by mistaken signals and mechanical difficulties.

The train travelled only about 30 km (19 miles) to Malines (Mechelen) where it halted for the night. Additional problems with disappearing engineers and sabotaged locomotives prevented the train from continuing. The next morning, 3 September, the Germans ordered the train to return to Brussels. Faced with the liberation of Brussels by the allied armies which would occur later that same day, the Germans were eager to collect all available transportation to evacuate their soldiers. About noon, the German Ambassador informed a delegation of Swiss and Swedish diplomats and Belgian officials that the SS had agreed to order the release of the political prisoners. The diplomats proceeded to the Klein-Eiland station (near Brussels) where the train and its prisoners were. The diplomats persuaded the German railway commander (who had not received the SS order) to release the political prisoners. About 12:30 p.m. the cattle cars were opened and the political prisoners released.

The German order to release the political prisoners did not include the release of the 53 POWs. In the chaos of the German evacuation of Brussels, the POWs escaped the night of 3 September. Belgian resistance workers directed the POWs to report to British headquarters which had been set up in the Metropol Hotel.

== See also ==
- Nacht und Nebel
