= Gertie Brown =

American actress (1882–1934)

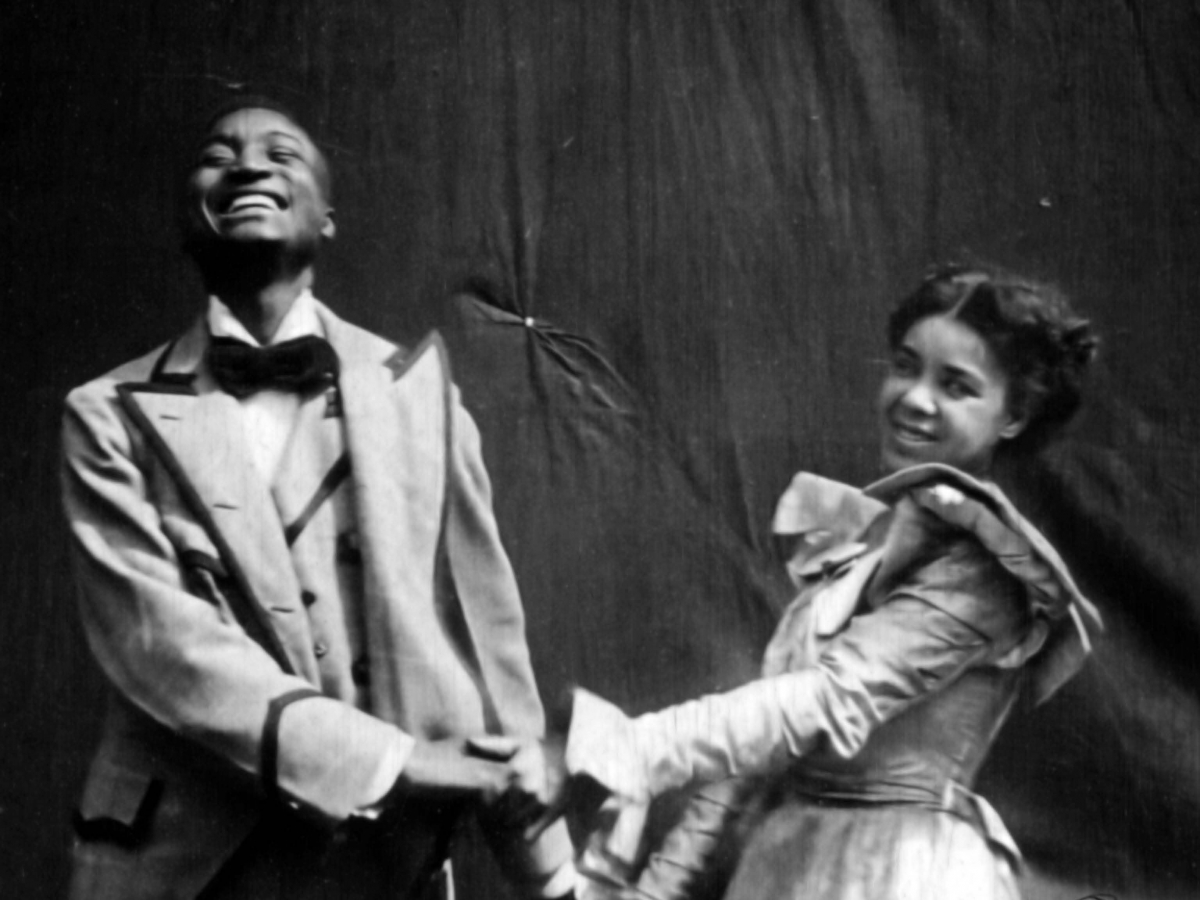
- Saint Suttle (left) and Brown (right) in a still from the 1898 silent film Something Good – Negro Kiss.
- Born: Gilberta Gertrude Chevalier; August 23, 1878; Washington, Guernsey County, Ohio, U.S.
- Died: February 24, 1934 (aged 55); New York City, New York, U.S.
- Other names: Gertie Brown, Gertie Brown Moore, Gertie Moore, Gertrude Brown, Gertrude Brown Moore, Gertrude Moore
- Occupation: Actress
- Spouse: Tim Moore (m. 1915)

Gertie Brown Moore (born Gilberta Gertrude Chevalier, August 23, 1878 – February 24, 1934) was a vaudeville performer and one of the first African-American film actresses. Brown is most famous for her part in the 1898 silent film Something Good – Negro Kiss, which went viral in 2018.

== Biography ==
According to the 1900 United States federal census, Gertie Brown, then aged 22, was born in 1878. According to her obituary, she began her career on the stage at the age of nine. In the 1890s, she performed alongside well-known composer and entertainer Saint Suttle (1870-1932) in vaudeville and minstrel shows in the Chicago area and nationally. Suttle, Brown, and John and Maud Brewster performed as a group called "The Rag-Time Four" that was responsible for popularizing a variation of the cakewalk dance. In 1899, Suttle and Brown were billed in vaudeville as "Two Real Ragtime Coons." From about 1906 to 1915, Gertie Brown was one of the stock players at Chicago's Pekin Theatre. Her performances there included such roles as "an Indian" in the show Coffey and Girls of All Nations in 1915.

Brown married comedian and actor Tim Moore in September 1915, and he introduced her to a new career which took her throughout the country and abroad. Billed as Tim & Gertie Moore, the couple toured vaudeville circuits across the United States, New Zealand, the Hawaiian Islands, and Australia and received acclaim as an "exceptionally clever" pair. From 1920 to 1924, they toured the Dudley and T.O.B.A. vaudeville circuits in their own stock company, The Chicago Follies. In 1923, they acted in the lost silent film His Great Chance.

With Tim Moore as the star, Gertie appeared with him on Broadway in the musical comedy Lucky Sambo in 1925. From 1925 to 1927, they toured the Columbia Burlesque Wheel in Edward E. Daly's hit show, Rarin' to Go. In 1927 she also appeared with him in The Southland Revue and, early in 1928, in his show Bronze Buddies. After her husband was engaged as the star comedian of Lew Leslie's Blackbirds of 1928, Gertie only occasionally appeared on the stage. She devoted much of her time to her home and helped organize charitable assistance to theatre folk who lost their jobs during the early years of the Great Depression, which included the setting up of a home for destitute actors.

She died in 1934 of double pneumonia at Harlem Hospital.

== Something Good – Negro Kiss ==
Rediscovered in 2017, Something Good – Negro Kiss stars an African-American couple embracing, kissing, and dancing. Research by scholar Allyson Nadia Field identified the actors as Suttle and Brown. Film historians believe that Something Good was an impromptu film shot in Chicago's South Loop district, possibly while Suttle and Brown were at William Selig's film studio to film a cakewalk dance. In 2022 it was included in the exhibition Regeneration: Black Cinema 1898–1971 at the Academy Museum of Motion Pictures in Los Angeles, USA.
