= J. Reginald MacEachron =

American architect

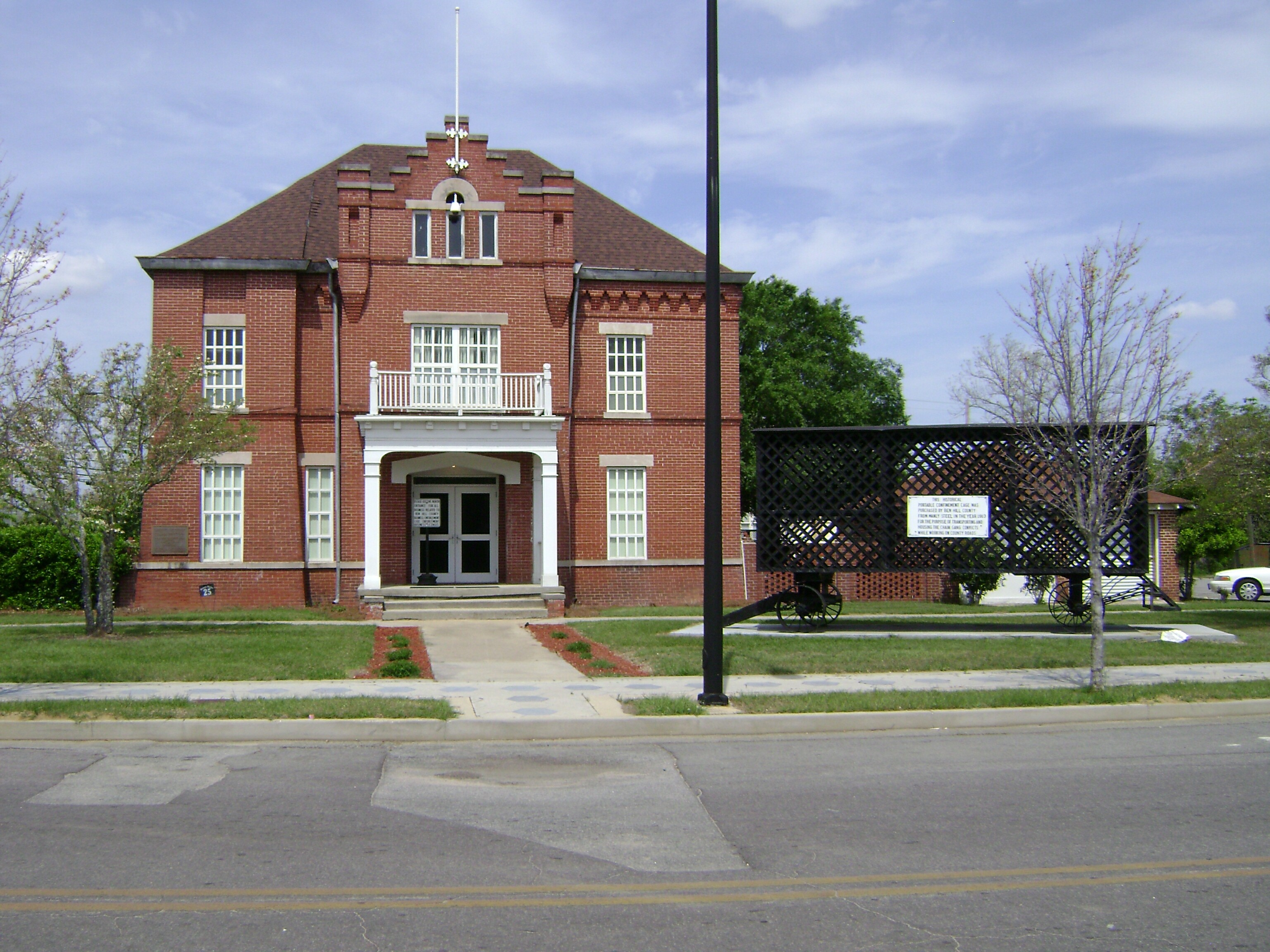
Ben Hill County Jail in Fitzgerald, Georgia

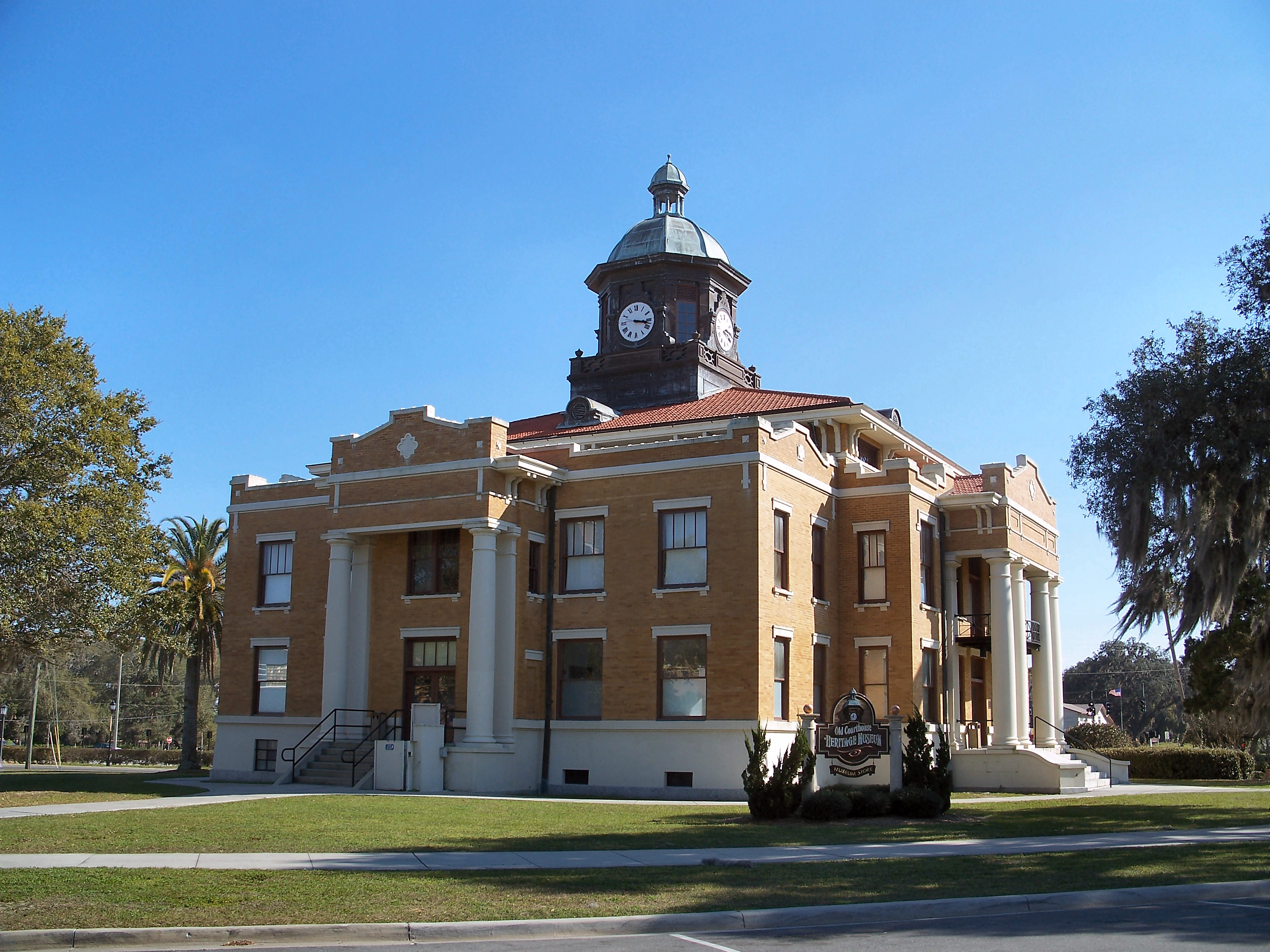
Citrus County Courthouse

J. Reginald MacEachron was an American architect and musical composer.

As an architect his work included the design of buildings on the Milledgeville campus of what became Georgia College and State University (GC&SU), the Citrus County Courthouse (with W. R. Biggers) in Florida, Douglass Theatre (1921) in Macon, Georgia for Charles H. Douglass and the Ben Hill County Jail (added to the National Register of Historic Places in 1982) on Pine Street in Fitzgerald, Georgia. He designed the Russell Auditorium and Bell Hall (both circa 1928) at GC&SU.

As a composer, he was known for "On Easy Street," composed in 1901.

== Musical compositions ==
- Good Bye to All Good Bye (1901)
- On Easy Street - in Rags (1901)
- Atlanta Spirit (1910)
- If You Only Knew (?)
