= A Painter's Idyl =

1911 film by Hobart Bosworth

The Painter's Idyll
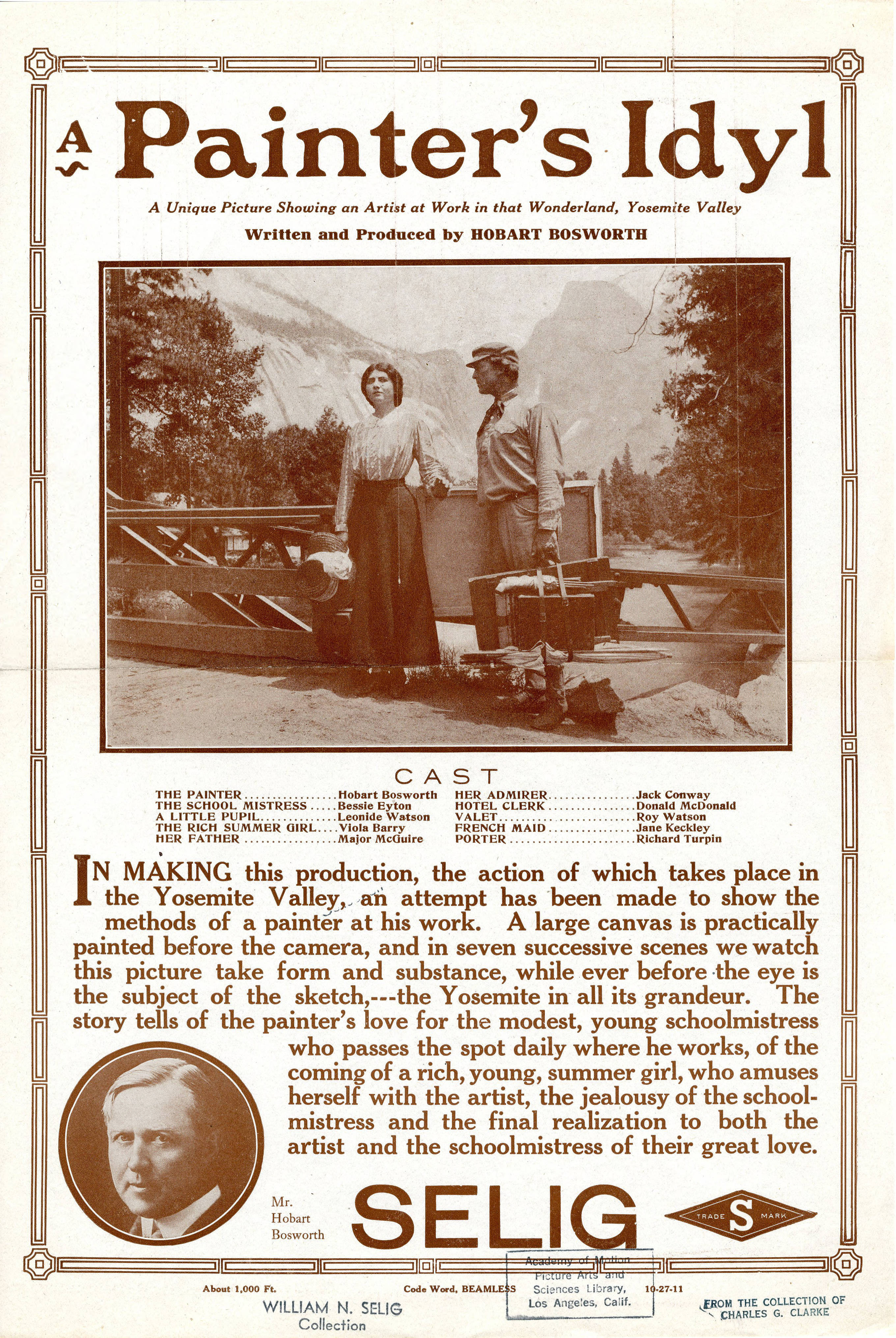
- Directed by: Hobart Bosworth
- Screenplay by: Hobart Bosworth
- Produced by: William Nicholas Selig
- Production company: Selig Polyscope Company
- Release date: October 27, 1911
- Country: United States
- Language: English

A Painter's Idyl is a short silent film from 1911, directed and interpreted by Hobart Bosworth.

== Production ==
The film was produced by William Nicholas Selig for his company, Selig Polyscope Company.

== Distribution ==
Distributed by the General Film Company, the film—a short reel—was released in US cinemas October 27, 1911.
