= Joe Byrd =

Joe or Joseph Byrd may refer to:

- Alton Byrd (Joseph Alton Byrd; born 1957), American–British basketball player and team executive
- Joe Byrd (Cherokee Nation Principal Chief) (born 1954)
- Joe Byrd (vaudeville), vaudeville comedian
- Joseph Byrd (1937–2025), American musician.

== See also ==
- Joe Bird (disambiguation)
- Joseph Birds (1887–1966), English footballer
