= Florida Blossoms =

American blackface minstrel show

The Florida Blossoms, or Florida Blossom Minstrels, was an American blackface minstrel show prominent on the Black Vaudeville touring circuit between its formation in 1906 and the 1940s.

== History ==
The Florida Blossoms Company was founded in 1906 in Tampa, Florida, by local African American businessman R. S. Donaldson, who had previously been a partner of Pat Chappelle in setting up the Rabbit's Foot Company. After the Blossoms' inaugural season in Florida and on the road, Donaldson sold the company in late 1907 to Macon, Georgia, businessmen Charles H. Douglass and Peter Worthy. Douglass was manager of vaudeville productions at Ocmulgee Park in the city, and later founded and operated the Douglass Theatre.

Douglass and Worthy set up an all-Black 36-strong tented show, with a big band, chorus, comedians, dancers and other entertainers. Among the leading performers were comedians Lonnie Fisher, Paul Carter, and Billie Richardson. They toured the Southern States in the following years, and in 1915 featured established singer Bessie Smith. The troupe became one of the most successful touring companies in the country. Peter Worthy died in 1918, and shortly afterwards the company came under the ownership of Oscar Rogers. Among new recruits to the company in 1923 was Dewey "Pigmeat" Markham, who stated that the tent held about 1,500 people, and that as a musician and comedian he was paid $12.50 per week. Band leaders included W.H. Dorsey (1907), E.B. Dudley (1909), Walter Childs (1911-13 and 1916-17), Atlee Cox (1915), J.H. McCamon (1920), J.H. Witherspoon (1924), Elijah Nelson (1925), Alonzo Williams (1926), and George Gillians (1928).

The company was owned by the Sparks Motor Co. of Macon in 1928, and in the 1940s was owned by George D. Floyd, an entrepreneur in Norfolk, Virginia, who also owned the Silas Green from New Orleans show. Records held by the Country Music Hall of Fame indicate that the Florida Blossom Minstrels were still touring in 1948.
