= Hamtree Harrington =

American comedian

James Carl "Hamtree" Harrington (1889-1956) was a popular American comedian in the 1900s. He helped found the Negro Actors Guild of America. He was in several films.

== Early life ==
James Carl Harrington was born in Columbia, South Carolina in 1889. At 14 years old, Harrington dropped out of school, ran away from home, and joined a traveling carnival.

== Vaudeville career ==
Upon leaving the carnival, Harrington took work as a comedian and Black vaudeville performer, moonlighting as a barber when stage work was unavailable. Throughout the late 1920s, Harrington worked as a vaudeville performer, often teaming up with well-known Black female performers. In the 1930s, Harrington began to perform solo. During that time, he acted in movies, started a singing career, and helped found the Negro Actors Guild of America. Harrington was one of the featured comics in Lew Leslie's Broadway production of Blackbirds of 1939, which starred Lena Horne and Tim Moore. Harrington's last show was in 1952. The genesis of Harrington's stage name, "Hamtree," is unknown, although it could have come from his large feet.

== Personal life ==
Early in his career, Harrington romanced a chorus girl named Edna Murray. That relationship produced a son. Not long after, Harrington toured with Maude Mills, a vaudeville actress, whom he married in 1916. Their marriage lasted five years. Harrington never remarried again before his death in 1956.
