= Taps Miller =

American singer

Marion Joseph "Taps" Miller
- Born: July 22, 1915 Indianapolis, Indiana, United States
- Died: Unknown
- Genres: Jazz
- Instrument: Trumpet

Marion Joseph "Taps" Miller (July 22, 1915, Indianapolis, Indiana, United States - ?) was an American entertainer, trumpeter, and vocalist.

== Biography ==
Miller sang and danced in stage revues in New York City from 1932 through the end of the decade, including in the show Blackbirds of 1939. Early in the 1940s he emceed at Kelly's Stables and sat in as a percussionist at Clark Monroe's Uptown House, in addition to singing on a recording by Count Basie in 1945. He joined the USO in 1944 as a sideman for Alberta Hunter, and returned to New York after the war, where he worked with Basie again. He joined Mezz Mezzrow's band in 1953 and toured with him throughout Europe and North Africa; while on this trip, he recorded in Belgium as a leader with Buck Clayton and Kansas Fields. He also played with Raymond Fonseque in Paris. He lived in France for some time after the tour; the details of his later life are unknown.
