= Suttle =

Suttle is a surname. Notable people with the surname include:

- Charles F. Suttle, (1834-1862), American slave-owner
- Curtis A. Suttle, Canadian microbiologist
- Deborah Suttle (born 1945), American politician from Nebraska
- Dorwin Wallace Suttle (1906–2001), United States federal judge
- Eugene Francis Suttle (Frank) (1909–1989), Irish comptroller and auditor general 1964–1973
- Felicia Mabuza-Suttle (born 1950), South African entrepreneur and talk show hostess
- Jim Suttle (born 1944), American politician from Nebraska
- Kellie Suttle (born 1973), American track and field athlete
- Ken Suttle (1928–2005), English cricketer
- Saint Suttle (1870–1932), American performer, composer

== See also ==
- Suttles
