= Saint Suttle =

African-American composer, songwriter, and entertainer

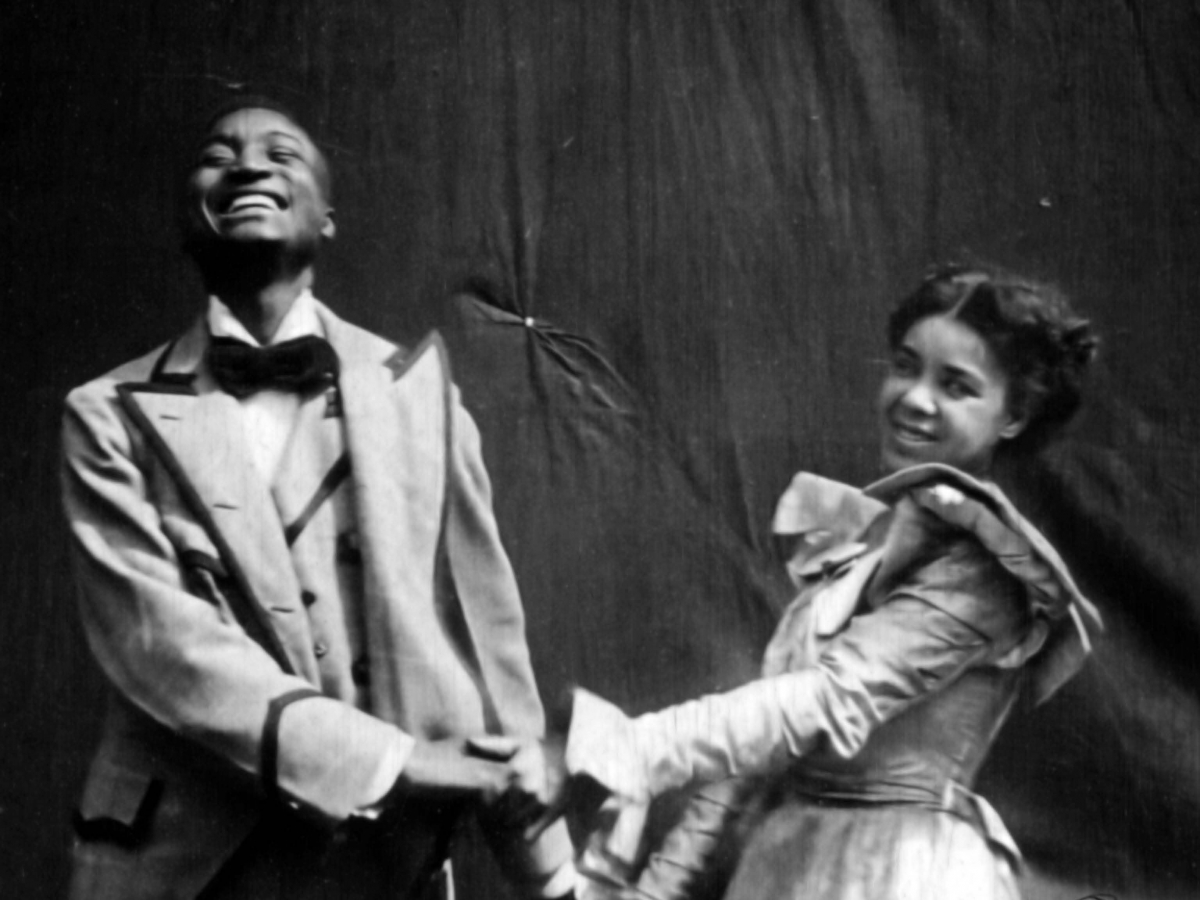
- Film still with Suttle (on left) and Brown from Something Good – Negro Kiss (1898)
- Born: February 1870
- Died: February 4, 1932 (aged 61–62)
- Occupations: composer, performer

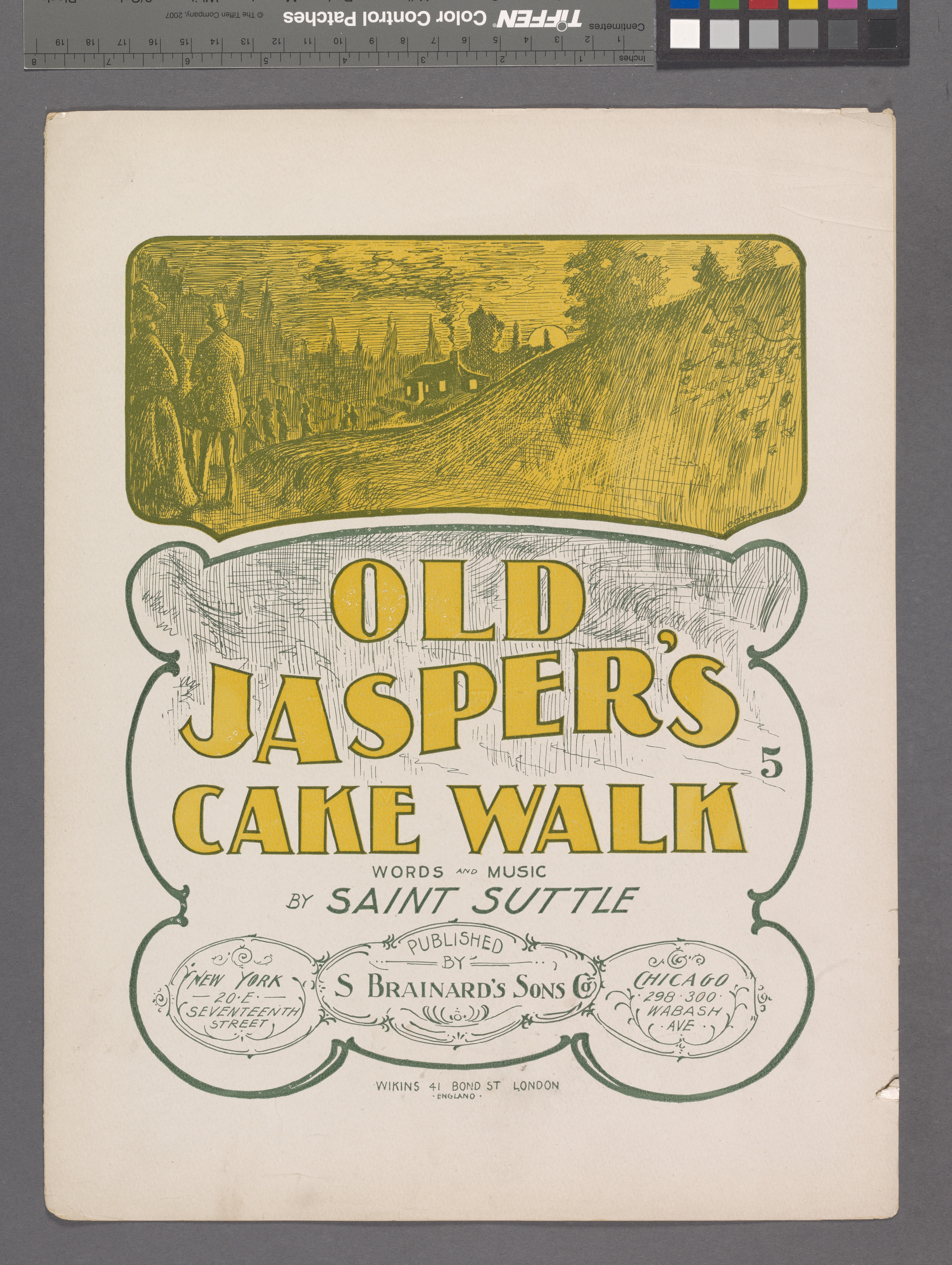
"Old Jasper's Cake Walk sheet music

Saint Suttle (February 1870 – February 4, 1932), was an American composer and performer. Suttle was well known as a cakewalk artist and vaudeville performer in Chicago. An African American, he was a pioneering performer in early film of the late 19th-century.

== Biography ==
Suttle holds hands and kisses Gertie Brown in the short film Something Good – Negro Kiss (1898), made by William Selig. It is the earliest known kiss between black people captured on film. This example of black intimacy on film was a positive depiction, pushing back against the dehumanizing stereotypes often seen in film in this time period. In 2022, the film was included in the exhibition Regeneration: Black Cinema 1898 – 1971 at the Academy Museum of Motion Pictures in Los Angeles, an exhibition with the objective of showing the contributions of Black artists and filmmakers from the start of the American film industry, that at times pushed against the conventional stereotypes.

Suttle and Brown are pictured on the 1898 sheet music for William H. Krell's "Shake Yo' Duster".

Suttle, Brown, John Brewster and Maud Brewster performed as a group called, "The Rag-Time Four" that was responsible for popularizing a variation of the cakewalk dance. In 1901, one of Suttle's cakewalk performances that toured was called the Coontown 400. He was also involved in developing plans to build a theater that fell through.

== Musical compositions ==
- "Old Jasper's Cake Walk" published by S. Brainard's Sons
- "That Creole Gal of Mine" published by S. Brainard's Sons
- "She's Ready Money" published by Joseph Flannery, Milwaukee, Wisconsin

== See also ==
- Suttle
