= Sandy Burns =

American comedian

Sandy Burns was a comedian. He toured on the T.O.B.A. circuit.

Burns led the Sandy Burns Stock Company. He was married to fellow performer Gretchen Burns.

He was born in Oklahoma City, Oklahoma and grew up in Huntsville, Texas.

He performed with Ferdinand “Jelly-Roll” Morton. He performed with Sam “Bill” Russell.

Quintart Miller met his future performing partner Marcus Slayter when both were part of the Burns’ stock company.

== Shows ==
- The Hunter Hors (1919)
- Hello Sue (1921)
- Hot Rhythm (1932)

== Filmography ==
- His Great Chance (1923)
- The Brand of Cain (1935)
- Murder in Harlem, also released as Lem Hawkins' Confession (1935)
