= Plant City High School =

Location
- 1 Raider Place; Plant City, Florida 33563-7199; United States; 27.991°N 82.129°W

Information
- Type: Public high school
- Established: 1914
- School district: Hillsborough County Public Schools
- Principal: Traci Durrance
- Teaching staff: 116.00 (FTE)
- Grades: 9-12
- Enrollment: 2,580 (2023–2024)
- Student to teacher ratio: 22.24
- Colours: Teal and Orange
- Team name: Raiders
- Website: www.hillsboroughschools.org/o/plantcity

The Plant City High School is a public high school in Plant City, Florida, United States and is part of the Hillsborough County Public Schools. The current school building was completed in 1972 on Maki Road, now called Raider Place.

== History ==
- Plant City High School
- U.S. National Register of Historic Places
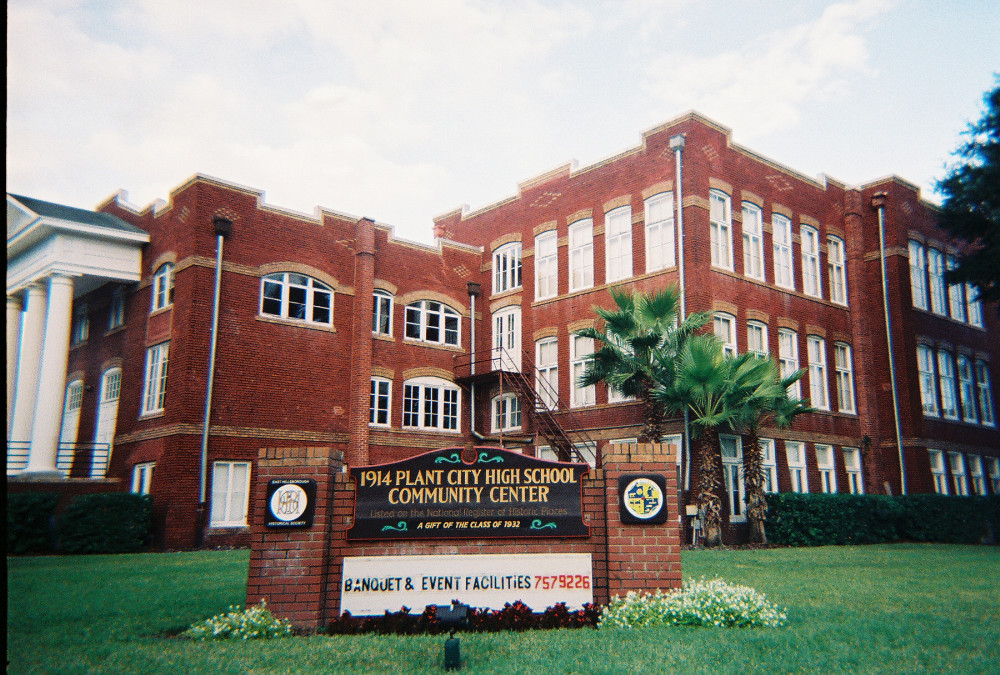
- The old Plant City High School

- Location within Florida Location within the United States
- Location: 605 N. Collins St., Plant City, Florida
- Coordinates: 28°1′9″N 82°7′36″W
- Area: less than one acre
- Built: 1914 mapframe = yes
- Architect: Willis R. Biggers, Dudley & Carlton
- Architectural style: Georgian Revival
- NRHP reference No.: 81000194
- Added to NRHP: February 4, 1981

The original school is located at 605 North Collins Street. It was built in 1914 and designed by Tampa-based architect Willis R. Biggers. The original building now houses a community center and historical society and was added to the U.S. National Register of Historic Places on February 4, 1981.

== School ==
In May 2006, Plant City High School was recognized as one of the top 1000 high schools in America by Newsweek magazine. Advanced Placement examination participation at PCHS has tripled since 2000, the largest increase in the district. Nearly 20% of the 2006 graduates passed an AP exam while in high school. Seven of the teachers are Nationally Board Certified.

The current principal is Ms. Traci Durrance.

== Improvement ==
Plant City was one of 16 schools nationwide selected by the College Board for inclusion in the EXCELerator School Improvement Model program beginning the 2007–2008 school year. The project was funded by the Bill & Melinda Gates Foundation.

== Notable alumni ==
- Arthur Cox (1979), former NFL player
- Kenny Rogers (1982), MLB pitcher
- Derrick Gainer (1984), NFL running back, 2x Super Bowl champion
- Ashley Moody (1993), thirty-eighth Attorney General of Florida and United States Senator from Florida
- Clay Roberts (2000), soccer player and coach
- Parker Messick (2019), 2019 Class 8A Baseball State Champions (30-2), FSU Baseball All-American Left Handed Pitcher from 2020-2022, and Selected in the second round of the 2022 MLB Draft, 54th Overall pick by the Cleveland Guardians
- Johni Broome (2020 - transferred), center for the Auburn Tigers
- Mario Williams (2021), 2019 Class 8A Baseball State Champions (30-2), Wide Receiver for the Tulane Green Wave
