= The Rag-Time Four =

Quartet performance group

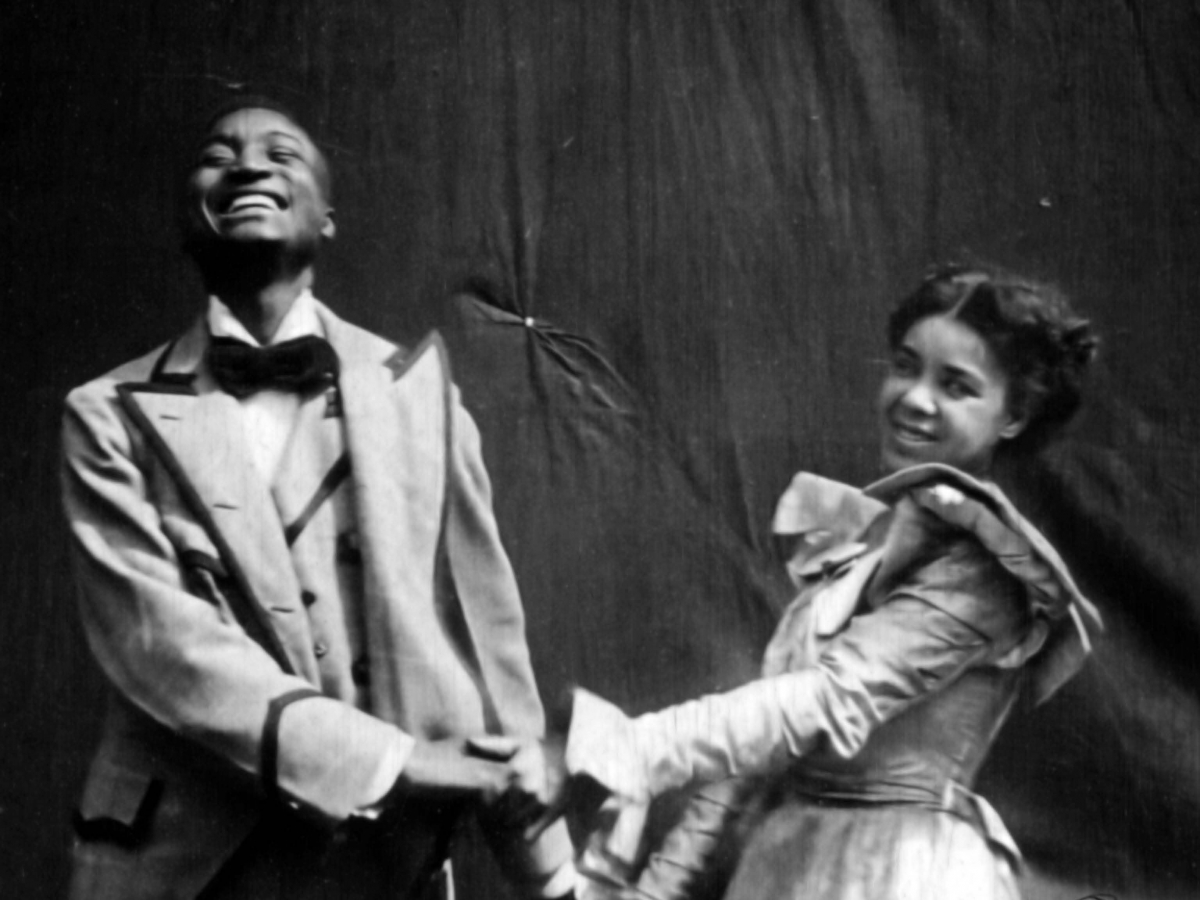
Saint Suttle and Gertie Brown, two members of The Rag-Time Four group

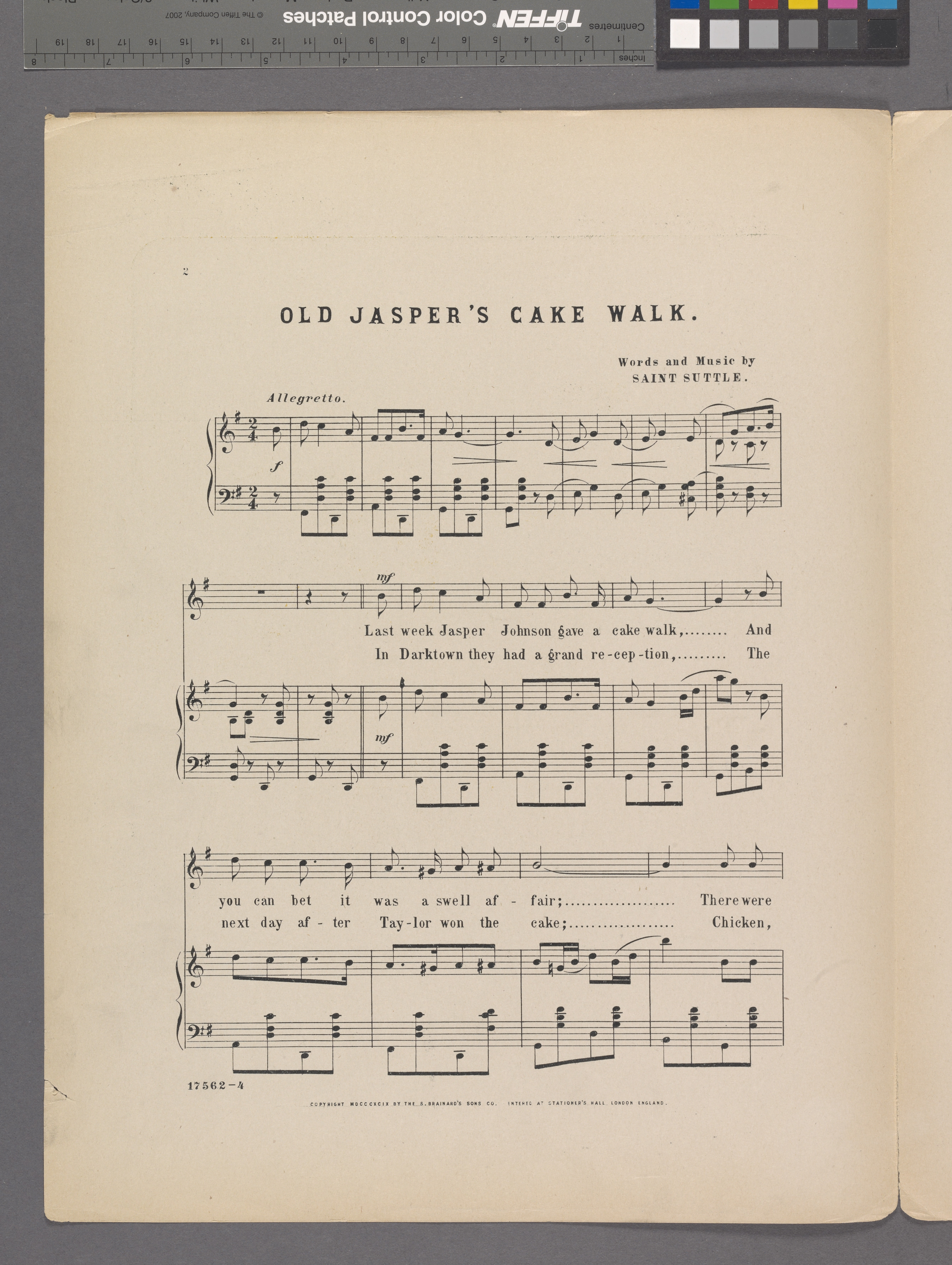
Old Jasper's Cake Walk, song written by Saint Suttle, a member of The Rag-Time Four

The Rag-Time Four was an American Quartet performance group circa 1898 to 1899, they were known for popularizing a version of the cakewalk dance. The four members of the group were Saint Suttle, Gertie Brown, John Brewster, and Maud Brewster. Suttle and Brewster were called the "Blackville Twins", while their female partners were called "their best girls". The group performed vaudeville in Chicago, along with in Milwaukee and Duluth. One of the groups cakewalk events was named Coontown 400.

== History ==
The origin of the cakewalk was a way for enslaved people to mock their masters, during the Antebellum South-period.

"The Two Real Ragtime Coons" was a name given to Suttle and Brown when they performed Vaudeville. The two were involved with many different projects together, with performance and minstrel shows in Chicago, including their involvement in the film Something Good – Negro Kiss (1898).

== Songs attributed to The Rag-Time Four ==
- Shake Yo' Dusters
