= The Tramp and the Dog =

1896 silent short film

- The full film
- Directed by: William Selig
- Distributed by: Selig Polyscope
- Release date: 1896
- Running time: 1 minute
- Country: United States
- Language: Silent

The Tramp and the Dog is an 1896 American silent short crime comedy film directed by William Selig. It is believed to be the first commercial production of American film pioneer William Selig at Selig Polyscope. It is also likely the first commercial narrative film shot in Chicago.

In 2025, it was selected for preservation in the United States National Film Registry by the Library of Congress as being "culturally, historically or aesthetically significant."

== Summary ==
Described as a "backyard comedy" (filmed in the Rogers Park neighborhood), the film opens with a baker coming outdoors into her yard and leaving a pie on a chair to cool. A tramp hops the fence into the backyard, grabs the pie and seeks to hop back over the fence. A bulldog appears who catches the backside of the tramp as he tries to escape, leading to various pratfalls, and the woman reappearing, swinging a broom to chase the tramp away.

== Rediscovery ==
The film became very popular and was distributed throughout North America and Europe. It began a film trend known as "pants humor" where the loss or threatened loss of the character's trousers formed the gag, and it led to a number of filmmakers to feature tramps and hobos in short comedic situations. It was a lost film until 2021, when it was rediscovered in the film archives of the National Library of Norway, where it shared a film strip with a version of another previously lost Selig production, Something Good – Negro Kiss.
