= Old Citrus County Courthouse =

- U.S. National Register of Historic Places
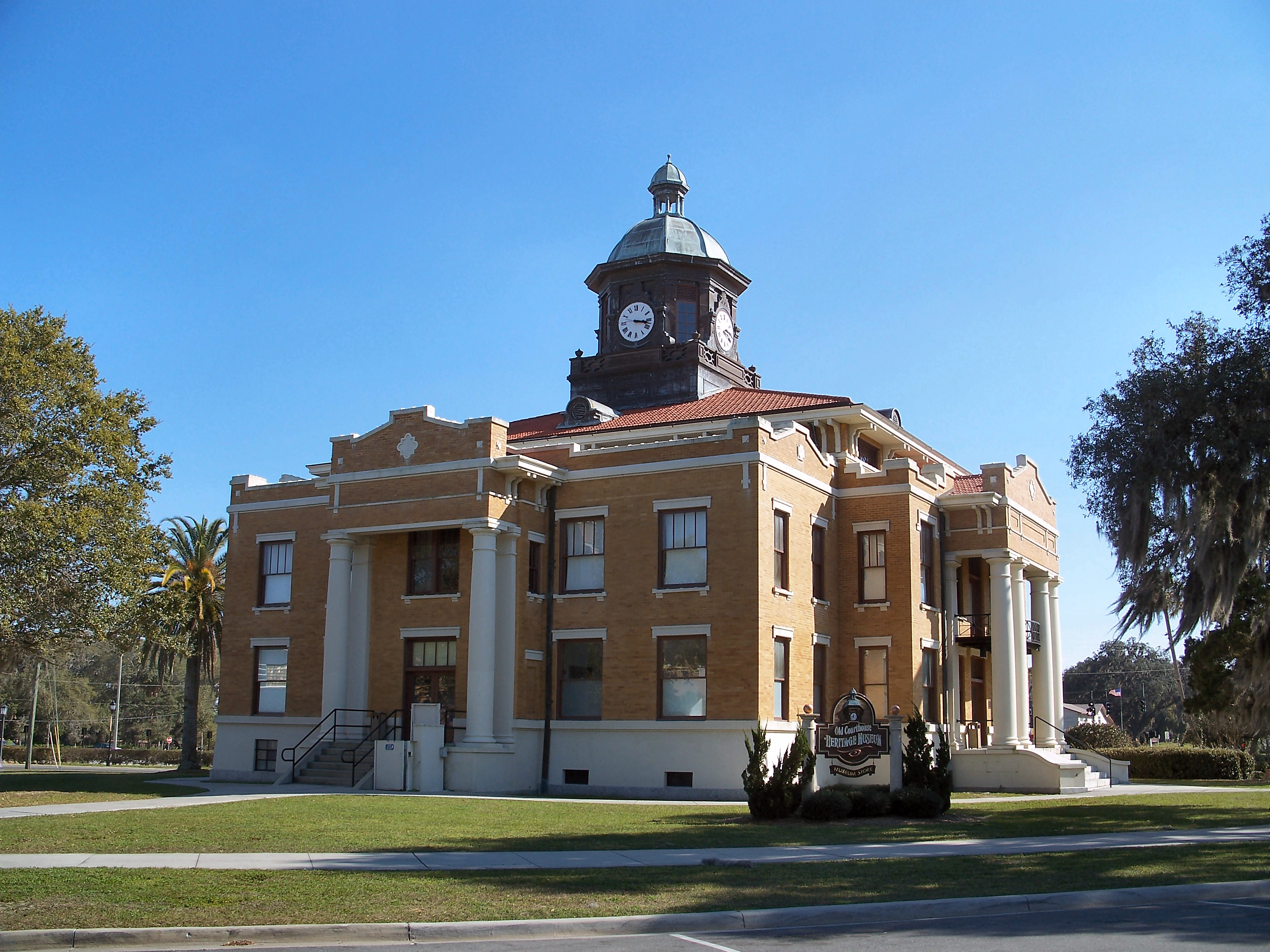

- Location within Florida Location within the United States
- Interactive map showing the location of Old Citrus County Courthouse
- Location: Inverness, Florida
- Coordinates: 28°50′8″N 82°19′49″W
- Built: 1912
- Architect: J. R. MacEachron and W. R. Biggers
- Architectural style: Neo-Classical, Italian Renaissance, Prairie School and Mission style elements
- NRHP reference No.: 92000340
- Added to NRHP: April 17, 1992

The Old Citrus County Courthouse (constructed in 1912) is a historic site in Inverness, Florida located at 1 Courthouse Square. On April 17, 1992, it was added to the U.S. National Register of Historic Places. The building was designed by J. R. MacEachron and Willis R. Biggers.

The Old Courthouse Heritage Museum opened in the building in 2000, and is operated by the Citrus County Historical Society. Exhibits focus on local county history.

In 1961, scenes from the movie Follow That Dream, starring Elvis Presley, were filmed in the courtroom.

In 1970 the courthouse was replaced by the Citrus County Courthouse.

In the 1990's the courthouse was beginning to fall into disrepair and plans for its demolition were created. These were stopped by its addition to the National Register of Historic Places in 1992. After this, an 8-year restoration project began to restore the old courthouse to its former glory. The courthouse's second floor was restored to its original appearance in 2000. This second-floor restoration relied on the courtroom scenes filmed there in 1961 for Follow That Dream.
