= Ernestine Wade =

American actress (1906–1983)

- Ernestine Wade as Sapphire Stevens on The Amos 'n' Andy Show (TV, 1951–53)
- Born: August 7, 1906; Jackson, Mississippi, U.S.
- Died: April 15, 1983 (aged 76); Los Angeles, California, U.S.
- Occupation: Actress
- Years active: 1940–1975

Ernestine Wade (August 7, 1906 – April 15, 1983) was an American actress. She was best known for playing the role of Sapphire Stevens on both the radio and TV versions of The Amos 'n' Andy Show.

== Career ==
Born in Jackson, Mississippi, Wade was trained as a singer and organist. Her family had a strong connection to the theater. Her mother, Hazel Wade, worked in vaudeville as a performer, while her maternal grandmother, Mrs. Johnson, worked for the Lincoln Theater in Baltimore, Maryland.

Ernestine grew up in Los Angeles and started her acting career at age four. In 1935, Ernestine was a member of the Four Hot Chocolates singing group. She appeared in bit parts in films and did the voice performance of a butterfly in the 1946 Walt Disney production Song of the South. Wade was a member of the choir organized by actress-singer Anne Brown for the filming of the George Gershwin biographical film Rhapsody in Blue (1945) and appeared in the film as one of the "Catfish Row" residents in the Porgy and Bess segment. She enjoyed the highest level of prominence on Amos 'n Andy by playing the "shrewish, demanding and manipulative" but really long-suffering wife of incurable grifter George "Kingfish" Stevens. Wade, Johnny Lee, and Lillian Randolph, Amanda Randolph, Jester Hairston, Roy Glenn (and several others) were among the Amos 'n' Andy radio cast members to also appear in the TV series.

Ernestine began playing Sapphire Stevens in 1939, but originally came to the Amos 'n' Andy radio show in the role of Valada Green, a lady who believed she had married Andy. In her interview that is part of the documentary Amos 'n' Andy: Anatomy of a Controversy, Wade related how she got the job with the radio show. Initially there for a singing role, she was asked if she could "do lines". When the answer was yes, she was first asked to say "I do" and then to scream; the scream got her the role of Valada Green. Ernestine also played the radio roles of The Widow Armbruster, Sara Fletcher, and Mrs. Van Porter.

In a 1979 interview, Ernestine related that she would often be stopped by strangers who recognized her from the television show, saying "I know who you are and I want to ask you, is that your real husband?" At her home, she had framed signed photos from the members of the Amos 'n' Andy television show cast. Tim Moore, her TV husband, wrote the following on his photo: "My Best Wishes to My Darling Battle Ax from the Kingfish Tim Moore".

Wade defended her character against criticism of being a negative stereotype of African American women. In a 1973 interview, she stated "I know there were those who were offended by it, but I still have people stop me on the street to tell me how much they enjoyed it. And many of those people are black members of the NAACP." The documentary Amos 'n' Andy: Anatomy of a Controversy covered the history of the radio and television shows as well as interviews with surviving cast members. Ernestine was among them, and she continued her defense of the show and those with roles in it. She believed that the roles she and her colleagues played made it possible for African-American actors who came later to be cast in a wider variety of roles. She also considered the early typecast roles, where women most often were cast as maids, not to be damaging, seeing them in the sense of someone being either given the role of the hero or the part of the villain.

In later years, she continued as an actress, doing more voice work for radio and cartoons. After Amos 'n' Andy, Wade did voice work in television and radio commercials. Ernestine also did office work and played the organ.

She also appeared in a 1967 episode of TV's Family Affair as a maid working for a stage actress played by Joan Blondell.

== Death ==
Wade died in 1983. She is buried in Angelus-Rosedale Cemetery in Los Angeles, California. Because she had no headstone, the West Adams Heritage Association marked her grave with a plaque.

== Filmography ==
Year	Title	Role	Notes
1940	Santa Fe Trail	Black Woman	uncredited
1943	Cabin in the Sky	Churchgoer	uncredited
1956	The Girl He Left Behind	Lorna	uncredited
1956	Three Violent People	Maid	uncredited
1957	The Guns of Fort Petticoat	Hetty	
1957	Bernardine	Cleo, Wilsons' Maid	uncredited
1960	High Time	Judge Carter's Maid	uncredited
1963	Critic's Choice	Thelma	
1969	Hey, Hey, Hey, It's Fat Albert	Bill's Mom (voice)	Television film
