= Blackbirds of 1939 =

Blackbirds of 1939 was an African-American musical revue in Lew Leslie's series of Blackbirds productions. It was the last revue, following on from Blackbirds of 1928, Blackbirds of 1930, Blackbirds of 1933, 1934, 1935, 1936 and 1937. The show was staged at the Hudson Theatre.

The revue's stars were Lena Horne, Tim Moore, Dewey Markham, Hamtree Harrington, Doc Sausage, Joe Byrd, and Rosalie King. There were several featured dancing specialty acts, as well as singers. Music was by Mitchell Parish and others.

The revue was short-lived, only running for nine performances, before closing.

== Songs ==
- 1. "Thursday" Dorothy Sacks & Irvin Graham, melody Louis Haber. Later recorded by Count Basie.
- 2. Shake Your Bluesies with Dancing Shoesies (by Louis Haber and Dorothy Sachs)
- 3. Father Divine (by Louis Haber and Dorothy Sachs)
- 4. I Did It for the Red, White and Blue (by Rube Bloom and Johnny Mercer)
- 5. When a Blackbird Is Blue (by Sammy Fain and Mitchell Parish)
- 6. You're So Indifferent (by Sammy Fain and Mitchell Parish)
- 7. Swing Struck (by Vic Mizzy and Irving Taylor)
- 8. Rhapsody in Blue (by George Gershwin)
