= Tim Moore (comedian) =

American actor (1887–1958)

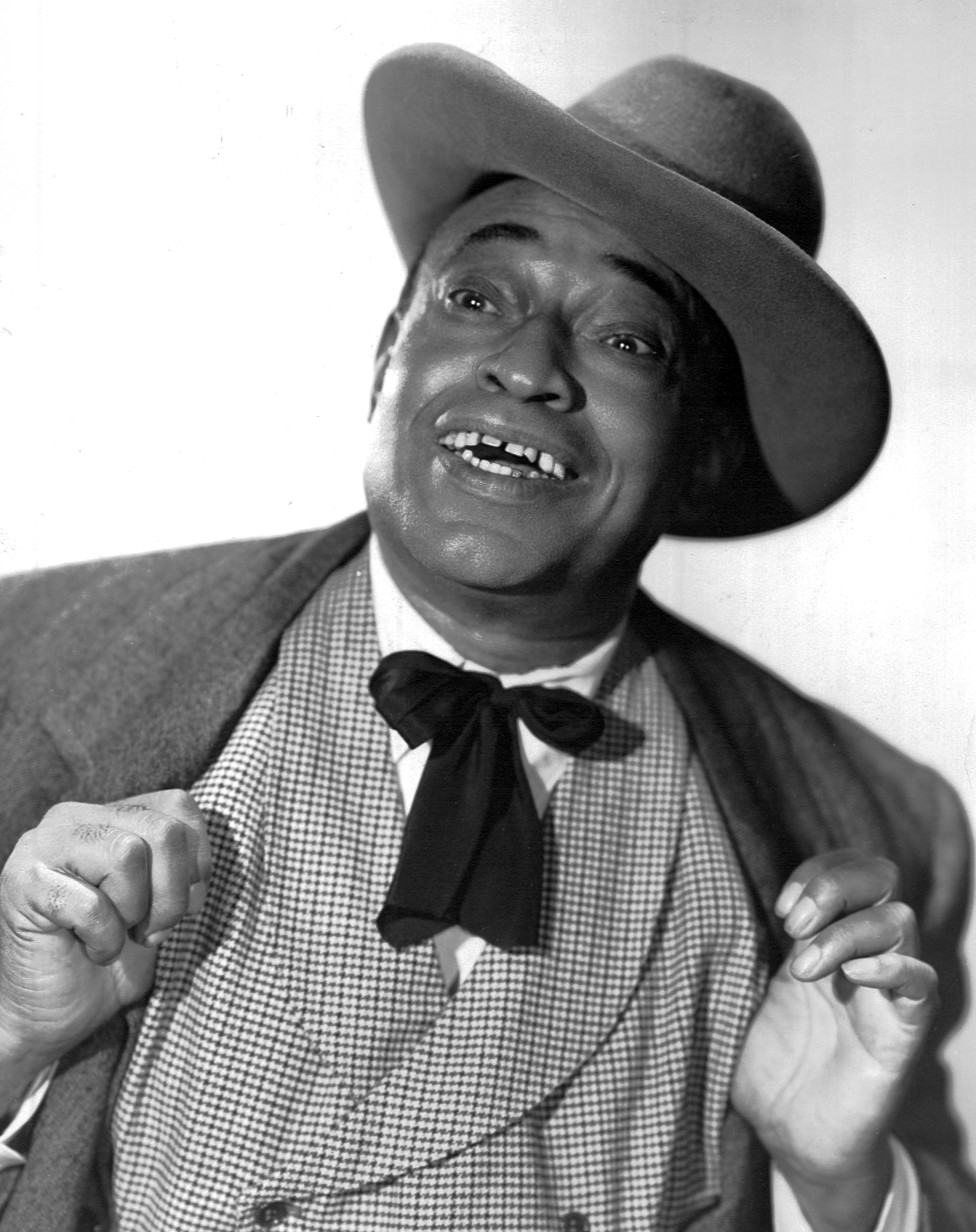
- Tim Moore as Kingfish on CBS TV's; The Amos 'n' Andy Show
- Born: Harry Roscoe Moore; December 9, 1887; Rock Island, Illinois, U.S.
- Died: December 13, 1958 (aged 71); Los Angeles, California, U.S.
- Occupation: Actor
- Years active: 1898–1958
- Spouses: Hester Moore (m. 1908; dissolved 1915) Gertie Brown (m. 1915; died 1934) Benzonia Davis (m. 1941; died 1956) Vivian Cravens (m. 1957)

Tim Moore (December 9, 1887 – December 13, 1958) was an American vaudevillian and comic actor of the first half of the 20th century. He gained his greatest recognition in the starring role of George "Kingfish" Stevens in the CBS TV's The Amos 'n' Andy Show. He proudly stated, "I've made it a point never to tell a joke on the stage that I couldn't tell in front of my mother."

== Biography ==
=== Early years ===
Moore was born Harry Roscoe Moore in Rock Island, Illinois, one of 13 children of Harry and Cynthia Moore. His father was a night watchman at a brewery. Tim Moore dropped out of grammar school to work at odd jobs in town and even danced for pennies in the streets with his friend, Romeo Washburn.

In 1898, Moore and Washburn went into vaudeville in an act called "Cora Miskel and Her Gold Dust Twins." It was booked by agents and travelled through the United States and even Great Britain. As Moore and Washburn grew older, the act became less effective and Miss Miskel sent them back to their parents in Rock Island. Shortly after this, Moore joined the medicine show of "Doctor Mick" (Charles S. Mick), who sold a patented quack remedy called Pru-ri-ta. Doctor Mick travelled through the Midwestern states, with songs and dances provided by Moore and four Kickapoo Indians. The young man also worked in a carnival sideshow and gave guided tours as a "native" tour guide in Hawaii.

=== Boxing and vaudeville years ===
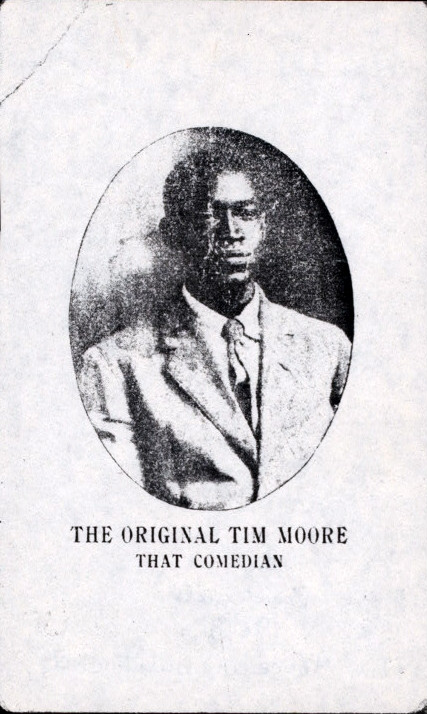
Early photo of Tim Moore

Moore left Doctor Mick, first to become a stableboy and later a jockey. He also tried his hand as a professional boxer under the name "Young Klondike" in 1905, and found it lucrative. He returned to performing in 1908, with a troupe of performers called "The Rabbit's Foot Company." By 1909, he was back in vaudeville and had met and married his first wife, Hester. They performed as a team, "The Moores – Tim & Hester", appearing in the United States and abroad. In 1910, the couple was part of an act called the Four Moores. They next performed together in "Georgia Sunflowers," a minstrel show that played the southern vaudeville circuit. The Moores drew glowing reviews, Hester for her singing and Tim for his comedy. By 1914, both Moores were co-stars of an act that was billed as Tim Moore and Tom Delaney & Co.. Tim played the tuba and Hester played drums as part of a band. Moore's own stock company was responsible for all aspects of it. The couple toured China, Japan, Australia, New Zealand, the Fiji Islands and Hawaii with a vaudeville troupe.

The marriage ended in divorce in 1915, and in September, Moore married a vaudeville actress named Gertrude Brown. After more than a year on the road in vaudeville in the United States, the Hawaiian Islands, Australia and New Zealand, he returned to boxing once more as "Young Klondike", training in New Zealand. He fought there and in Australia, England, and Scotland. Before this, Moore fought as "Young Klondike" in the US, with Jack Johnson and Sam Langford as some of his opponents. While Tim and Gertie were entertaining in New Zealand, a story in The Evening Post from May 28, 1917, went on to say, "Another "star" item will be that of Tim and Gertie Moore, who have earned a big reputation in America, and were booked for Fuller's direct from the well-known Orpheum circuit." Moore became well known for his one-man presentation of Uncle Tom's Cabin, where he would play the role of both Simon Legree and Uncle Tom, applying white chalk to half his face, and burnt cork to the other. Moore literally took his one man act into the street of San Jose, California, for the sale of War Stamps in 1918.

Having made $141,000 with his fists, in 1921 Moore and his wife returned to performing full-time in vaudeville. He formed his Chicago Follies troupe and was a favorite on the Theater Owners Booking Association vaudeville circuit during the "Roaring Twenties" period. In 1923, Moore and his wife co-starred with Sandy Burns, Fannetta Burns, Walter Long, and Bobby Smart in a silent film comedy, His Great Chance, directed by Ben Strasser (North State Film Corp.). The following year, the Moores toured vaudeville together in "Aces and Queens". Subsequently, he went on tour as one of the stars of producer Edward E. Daley's "black and white musical comedy sensation", Rarin' to Go, for three seasons on the Columbia Burlesque Wheel (1925, 1926 and 1927 editions).

=== Broadway comedian ===
In June 1925, Tim Moore made his Broadway debut as the star of Lucky Sambo (based on "Aces and Queens'). However, the show closed after only a few performances. He was a success in burlesque in the mid 1920s with the hit show Rarin' to Go, followed by a return to vaudeville in 1927 with The Southland Revue. In 1928, he produced and starred in weekly shows at Harlem theatres such as the Alhambra. Moore wrote all of his own material and also did some writing for other performers; a Moore skit called, "Not a Fit Night for Man Nor Beast", was bought by W.C. Fields. He also did some writing for the radio show of the Two Black Crows comedy team. Moore was brought to New York to sign a writing contract but before this was done, Charles Mack of the team was killed in an auto accident, thus ending the act. Moore wrote sketches which became part of Lew Leslie's "Blackbirds" revues as well.

In 1928, Moore took time off from his vaudeville bookings to try his luck once more on the Great White Way – Broadway. This time he met with enormous success as the star comedian of Lew Leslie's hit musical comedy revue, the Blackbirds of 1928. Moore's co-stars were singers Adelaide Hall and Aida Ward and renowned tap dancer Bill "Bojangles" Robinson. The hit musical scored high in Paris and London as well as on the road throughout the states. In 1931, Moore and his then vaudeville straight man at the Alhambra, Andrew Tribble, performed one of their funniest routines in Oscar Micheaux's first talking picture, The Darktown Revue. After a disagreement with Lew Leslie, Moore starred in two unsuccessful Broadway revues for other producers, Fast and Furious (1931), and The Blackberries of 1932. In the former, Moore wrote some of the skits along with his friend and co-star Zora Neale Hurston. Moore and fellow comedian "Morton" (i.e., Mantan Moreland) left the show in April 1932, refusing to perform what were termed "dirty lines". Needing each other, he and Leslie patched up their differences and Moore resumed his position as star comedian in the Blackbirds revues of 1934, 1935, 1936, 1937, and 1939. Politics played a role in the 1936 edition of the Blackbirds, causing the London run to be shut down. At the time the troupe was booked in the United Kingdom, King Edward VIII had just abdicated the British throne for love of American Wallis Simpson. There was a wave of anti-Americanism, with women picketing performances of the Blackbirds, carrying signs disparaging American women. Yet the next season saw the return of the revue as Blackbirds of 1937, its last edition in England. Two years later, on Broadway, Lew Leslie presented the last edition of the Blackbirds (1939); the principal singing star was Lena Horne. Moore's last Broadway show was Harlem Cavalcade (1942), produced by Ed Sullivan and Noble Sissle. When Al Jolson attended a performance of Harlem Cavalcade at the Ritz Theatre, he declared that "Moore was one of the most expert craftsmen he had ever roared at." During the late 1930s and early 1940s, Moore was one of the top comedians headlining at the Apollo Theater in Harlem. He also performed on radio as a dramatic actor.

In 1946, he had the leading role in a theatrical motion picture, Boy! What a Girl!. Moore carried the comedy as the hapless Bumpsie, forced to masquerade as a woman. He made some appearances on Ed Sullivan's television show, Toast of the Town, and at the Apollo Theater; Moore then retired from show business. His wife Gertrude having died in 1934, Moore settled down with his third wife, Benzonia Davis Moore (1889–1956). The couple was married in 1941 and initially made their home in Baltimore. In 1946, the couple settled down in his home town of Rock Island. There, he kept busy working the night shift at the Servus Rubber company, where boots and shoes were made.

=== Television stardom ===
In 1948, CBS hired Flournoy Miller as a casting advisor for the planned Amos 'n' Andy TV series. They had failed to locate Tim Moore for the role of George "Kingfish" Stevens, a role which was created and voiced on radio by white actor Freeman Gosden. It was Miller's job to trace the actor's whereabouts. Meanwhile, in January 1950, Moore went to New York to perform at the Apollo and appear as guest star on CBS-TV's Toast of the Town. After fulfilling these engagements, Moore returned to Rock Island. A few months later, Flournoy Miller called the manager of the Apollo and finally received Moore's address. Moore did voice tests at CBS radio studios in Peoria and Chicago, and then was brought to CBS-TV in Hollywood for a screen test. He returned to Rock Island. Shortly after this, he was signed by Columbia Broadcasting System to star in a new television adaptation of Amos 'n' Andy. As the radio series had developed in prior years, the scheming but henpecked Kingfish had become the central focus of most of the plots. In the television version, Moore played the character more broadly, with louder and more forceful delivery and a distinctive Georgia drawl, exaggerated for comic effect. Moore's Kingfish dominated the calmer and soft-spoken "Amos 'n' Andy" characters. Early in his career, Moore had developed a "con-man" routine he used for many years while in vaudeville; re-working some aspects of his old act produced the television character Kingfish.

Moore was very popular in the show and for the first time in his career became a national celebrity as well as the first African American to win stardom on television. When leaving a train in Albuquerque to buy some Native American pottery, the proprietor recognized him immediately, saying, "You, you Kingfish." This was the first time it happened in Moore's 52 years in show business. The show aired on prime-time TV from June 1951 to June 1953. Although quite popular, the series was eventually canceled due to complaints about ethnic stereotyping. Shortly after the television show left the air, there were plans to turn it into a vaudeville act in August 1953, with Moore, Williams, and Childress playing the same characters. Although it is not known if this ever materialized in that year, a vaudeville-style Amos 'n' Andy road show did tour the country in 1957. After the series was canceled, it was shown in syndication until 1966 when increasing condemnation and pressure from the NAACP persuaded the show's owners (CBS, which still owns the copyrights) to withdraw it from further exhibition. It was resurrected in the early days of home videotape through dealers of public domain video, who had acquired episodes from collectors of used 16mm TV prints, although the series was never in the public domain and the copyrights are still in force. Bootlegged copies continue to be sold over the internet. The series itself would not be seen on a regular basis again until independent network Rejoice TV began airing episodes in 2012.

Tim Moore starred in a spinoff series, The Adventures of Kingfish, which made its debut on CBS on January 4, 1955. Moore led the cast, supported by Ernestine Wade as his level-headed, emotionally strong wife Sapphire, and Amanda Randolph as his openly aggressive mother-in-law. These 13 half-hour episodes did not feature Amos or Andy. When the 65 Amos 'n' Andy half-hours went into syndication, the 13 Adventures of Kingfish shows were added to the syndicated package and became part of the Amos 'n' Andy series.

In 1956, Moore and his fellow cast members Spencer Williams, Alvin Childress, and Lillian Randolph with her choir, tried a tour of personal appearances as "The TV Stars of Amos 'n' Andy". The tour was halted by CBS, who viewed this as infringing on their exclusivity. Moore, and fellow cast members Williams, Childress and Lee, were able to perform for one night in 1957 in Windsor, Ontario, since legal action had not been taken against them in Canada.

=== Later years ===
Moore married his last wife Vivian Cravens (1912–1988) eight months after Benzonia's death; she should not be confused with actress Vivian Harris with whom he had been performing as a comedy team at the Apollo Theatre in Harlem in the 1940s. This marriage won considerable publicity for him thanks to the "Roast Beef Scandal" of January 1958. Moore fired a gunshot in his home because of his "mooching in-laws" (stepson, stepdaughter, and her husband) when he found that the last of the New Year's roast beef had been eaten by them. Moore related, "These free-loaders have eaten everything in the house. My wife protects them and every time we talk about it, we get into an argument. The argument got a little loud and the next thing I knew, the big boy (his stepson Hubbard) jumped out of his chair. I ran upstairs and got out my old pistol. I didn't want to hit anybody."

When the police arrived at the home, Moore, pistol still in his belt, told them, "I'm the old Kingfish, boys. I'm the one you want. I fired that shot. I didn't want to hit anyone, although I could have. Anyway, you should have seen the in-laws scatter when I fired that gun." The shot Moore fired hit the china cabinet; he was arrested and charged with assault with a deadly weapon, with police calling him the "funniest prisoner in police history." Moore was initially ordered held on $1,000 bond; the judge changed his mind and released Moore on his own recognizance. Tim and his wife reconciled, with Vivian's pleading for the charges to be dropped. Moore entered a not guilty plea before the case went to trial on March 24. He received a $100 fine and a year's probation as his sentence.

When the story broke, local television personality and columnist Paul Coates invited Tim Moore to appear on his KTTV television show; Moore explained the situation in two guest appearances. Coates was promptly taken to task for Moore's appearances on his show by Stanley Robertson, a journalist for the African-American newspaper, the Los Angeles Sentinel, calling Moore "disgraceful" and labeling the two shows with Moore as "television's darkest hour." Coates replied to his critic in his January 29, 1958 Los Angeles Times column, calling Moore "a pretty wonderful, sincere man" and saying he strongly resented Robertson's attack on him.

Because of the "Roast Beef Scandal," Moore was once more in demand and even received a testimonial tribute dinner from the Friars Club of Beverly Hills, and appearing on The Tonight Show with Jack Paar. The publicity also won an extended performance engagement for him at the legendary Mocambo nightclub.

== Death and legacy ==
Moore died at age 71 on December 13, 1958, of pulmonary tuberculosis in Los Angeles, four days after his birthday. There was no money to pay for his hospital care or for his funeral, Moore having received his final $65.00 residual payment from Amos 'n' Andy in January 1958. At one time, Moore had made $700 per week.

After a large funeral at Mt. Sinai Baptist Church, he was buried at Rosedale Cemetery. At the funeral service, 10,000 fans and mourners passed his open coffin; attendance was star-studded and included Groucho Marx, Frank Sinatra, Dean Martin, Louis Armstrong, Eddie Cochran, Tony Curtis, Sidney Poitier, Charlie Barnet, Noble Sissle, Erskine Hawkins, Louis Prima, Freeman F. Gosden, Charles Correll, Spencer Williams Jr., Alvin Childress, Ernestine Wade, Amanda Randolph, Johnny Lee, Lillian Randolph, Sammy Davis Jr., Eddie "Rochester" Anderson, Andy Razaf, Clarence Muse, Roy Glenn, Mantan Moreland, Pigmeat Markham, Willie Bryant, Earl Grant. Sammy Davis Jr. later related that Frank Sinatra organized the effort to pay Tim Moore's funeral expenses. Moore's grave remained unmarked from the time of his burial until 1983; fellow comedians Redd Foxx and George Kirby raised funds for a headstone, and Eddie Murphy stated he purchased one.

Paying tribute to one of its favorite sons, the Rock Island Public Library held "Tim Moore Day" July 16, 2008. Moore's relatives in the area participated by sharing their memories of his life and work.

In spite of Moore's achievement as the first major African American television star, there has not yet been a purchase of a star to honor him on the Hollywood Walk of Fame.

== Selected stage productions ==
- Cora Miskel and Her Gold Dust Twins (vaudeville, 1899–1901)
- Rabbit Foot Minstrels (travelling road show, 1908)
- Tim Moore and His Georgia Sunflowers (vaudeville tour, 1909–10)
- The Chicago Follies (vaudeville tour, 1915–16)
- Bronze Revue (Honolulu, Hawaii, 1916)
- A Wedding in Jazz (vaudeville tour, 1919)
- The Chicago Follies [aka The Tim Moore Follies] (vaudeville tours, 1920–25)
- Rosie's Wedding Day (vaudeville tour, 1923)
- Aces and Queens (vaudeville, 1924)
- Lucky Sambo (Broadway, 1925)
- Rarin' to Go (Columbia Burlesque Circuit, 1925–27)
- The Southland Revue (vaudeville tour, 1927)
- Take The Air (touring road show, 1927)
- Bronze Buddies (Harlem, 1928)
- Blackbirds of 1928 (Broadway, 1928–29; Moulin Rouge, Paris, 1929; and London, 1929)
- Say It With Girls (Harlem, 1930)
- Fast and Furious (Broadway, 1931)
- Harlem Scandals (Harlem, 1931–32)
- Blackberries of 1932 (Broadway, 1932)
- Blackbirds of 1934 (England, Scotland and provinces)
- Blackbirds of 1935 (England and Scotland and provinces)
- Blackbirds of 1936 (England and provinces)
- Blackbirds of 1937 (England, Scotland and provinces)
- The Black Messiah (Harlem, 1939)
- Blackbirds of 1939 (Broadway, 1939)
- Rhapsody in Black (Erlanger Theatre, Philadelphia, 1941)
- Harlem Cavalcade (Broadway, 1942)
- Amos 'n' Andy Revue (touring road show, 1957)
