= Joe Bird =

Joe Bird may refer to:

- Joe Bird (singer) (1967–2009), member of Canadian comedy troupe Three Dead Trolls in a Baggie
- Joe Bird (baseball), manager of teams such as the Cooleemee Cards
- J. Edward Bird (1868–1948), Canadian legal figure
- Joe Bird (actor), Australian actor

== See also ==
- Joseph Byrd (disambiguation)
