= Something Good – Negro Kiss =

- A still frame from the film
- Directed by: William Selig
- Starring: Saint Suttle; Gertie Brown
- Distributed by: Selig Polyscope through Sears & Roebuck
- Release date: 1898
- Running time: 29 seconds (1st rediscovered version); 49 seconds (2nd rediscovered version)
- Country: United States
- Language: silent

Something Good – Negro Kiss is an American short silent film made in 1898 that depicts a couple kissing and holding hands. It is believed to be the earliest depiction of on-screen kissing involving African Americans, and is noted for departing from the prevalent stereotypical presentation of racist caricatures in American popular culture at the time it was made. The film was a lost film until its rediscovery in 2017, and in 2018, the film was selected for preservation in the National Film Registry by the Library of Congress.

== Production ==
The full film

In Something Good, a well-dressed African American couple exchange several kisses. Between kisses they hold and swing each other's hands and laugh together. The chemistry in the performances is described as "palpable", conveying an "unmistakable sense of naturalness, pleasure, and amusement." A slightly longer version came to light in 2021; this version shows the couple before they embrace, and includes the "prelude before the kisses, with wooing, refusal and negotiation." The longer version was produced at the same time and may have been produced for the international market. Research notes that alternate versions were sold and separately listed with varying lengths. The longer version is also from a perspective point further away and inverted, with the actors on opposite sides from the first version, although whether this was a mistake in production or reproduction is unknown. Scholars also perceive the longer film as more "vaudevillesque", with more acting work, than the romance of the first.

When it was produced, it was likely presented with other shorts as a comedy vignette, a take-off on the 1896 film The Kiss. Something Good starred stage entertainers Saint Suttle and Gertie Brown. Suttle was a composer for popular theater and Brown a vaudeville circuit actress. The two also performed as dance partners. They were part of a group known as The Rag-Time Four, who performed variations on the popular cakewalk dance. They may have been at the film studio to perform in a cakewalk vignette, playing the film as impromptu.

The film was made in Chicago by director and producer William Selig, a film pioneer, who also had prior experience with staged minstrel shows. He used his own version of a Lumière cinématographe camera to shoot Something Good. Selig distributed the Selig Polyscope Company film through the Sears & Roebuck mail order catalog.

== Rediscovery ==
A 20-second-long negative of Something Good's nitrate film was rediscovered at an estate sale in Louisiana by archivist Dino Everett from the University of Southern California in 2017. Reviewing the technical details of the film, thereby dating it with the film stock and perforation holes, catalogs and sales material, Everett at USC and Allyson Field at the University of Chicago were able to identify the film's production history. The USC Hugh M. Hefner Moving Image Archive claims the copyright to the restored version of the film, which it published on Vimeo.

Four years later, in 2021, a 49-second film held in the National Library of Norway in Oslo was identified as an extended version of Something Good. At the time of its accession by the Library, it was misidentified and cataloged as a Lumière film. It is one of the oldest films in the National Library collection.

This copy was included in a reel found in Leksvik Municipality, and was housed in a barn until authorities said the films posed a risk of fire. Oral history suggests the film came to Norway when a Norwegian filmmaker wanted to assemble a projector in the early days of film and brought home film-reels from the US. News of the 2017 discovery in the United States caused the National Library of Norway to reexamine it and correct its provenance.

The film was listed in catalogs of lost films before its rediscovery, although details concerning the film, other than its title and director, were unknown. Since almost all surviving films from that time that depict African Americans are overtly racist, it was usually just listed as a lost race film.

== See also ==
- African American cinema
- The Tramp and the Dog, an 1896 Selig film rediscovered on the same film strip as the Something Good version in the Norway National Library.
