= Suttles =

Suttles is a surname. Notable people with the surname include:

- Duncan Suttles (born 1945), Canadian chess player
- Gerald D. Suttles (1932–2017), American sociologist
- Mule Suttles (1900–1966), American baseball player
- Wayne Suttles (1918–2005), American anthropologist and linguist

== See also ==
- Suttle
