= Willis R. Biggers =

American architect

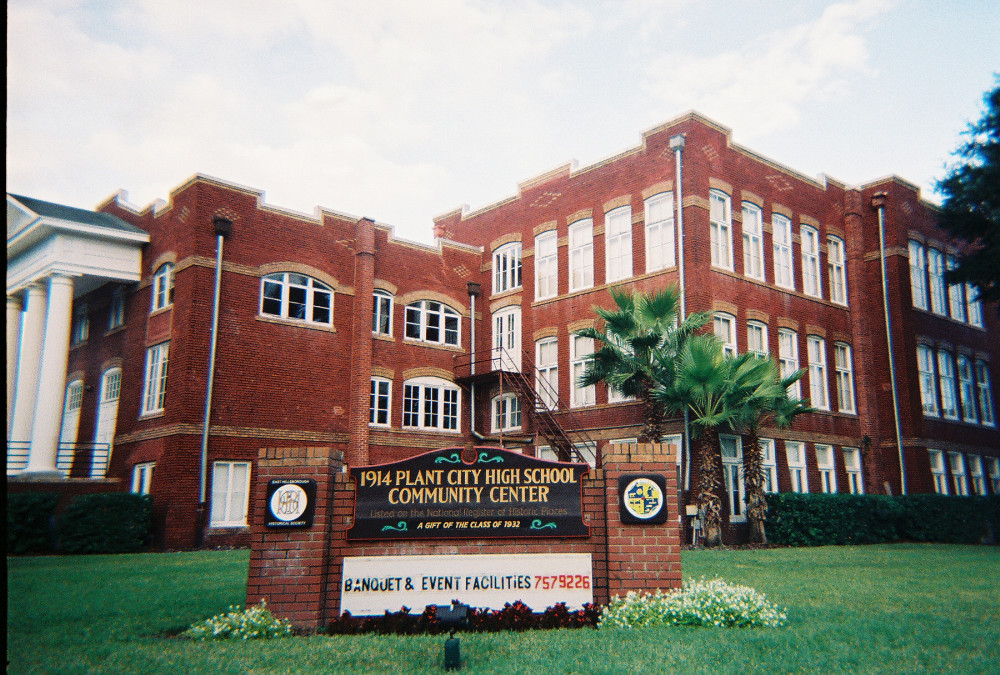
The original Plant City High School, now a community center

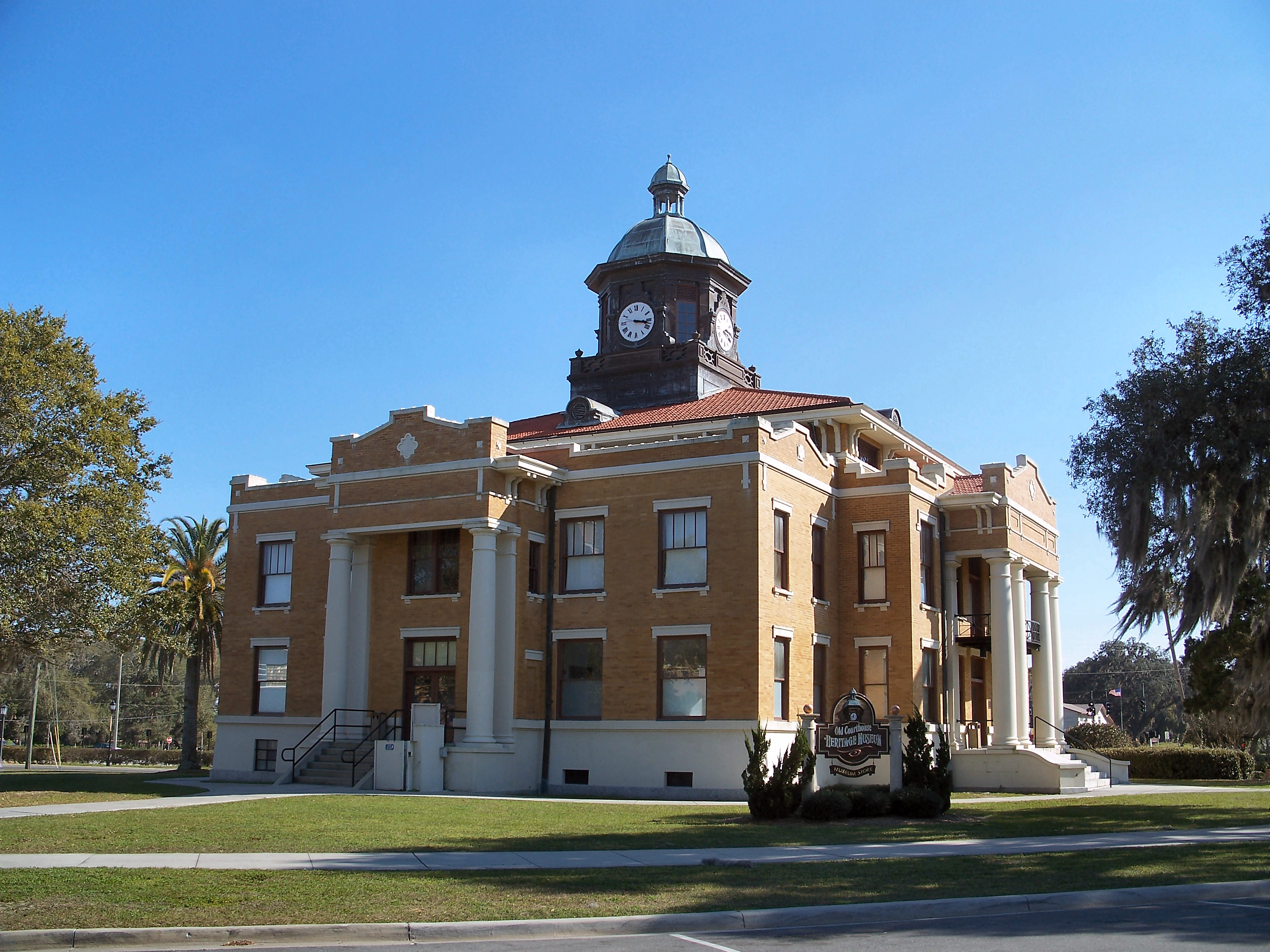
Biggers designed the Citrus County Courthouse with J. R. MacEachron

Willis R. Biggers was an architect in Florida during the early 20th century. He designed the Citrus County Courthouse with J. R. MacEachron and the original Plant City High School, which is now a community center. The old Sarasota High School building (1912) was also designed by Biggers, though the school moved to a new building on the South Tamiami Trail in 1926. The old building was used as a library until the Chidsey Library was built in 1940 and was used as a youth center and as a Works Progress Administration sewing room during World War II. It was demolished in the late 1950s.
