= Derrick Gainer (American football) =

American football player (born 1966)

No. 27, 39
- Position: Running back

Personal information
- Born: August 15, 1966 (age 60); Plant City, Florida, U.S.
- Listed height: 5 ft 11 in (1.80 m)
- Listed weight: 235 lb (107 kg)

Career information
- High school: Plant City
- College: Florida A&M
- NFL draft: 1989: 8th round, 205th overall pick

Career history
- Los Angeles Raiders (1989)*; Cleveland Browns (1989–1990); Los Angeles Raiders (1992); Dallas Cowboys (1992–1993); Los Angeles Raiders (1994)*
- * Offseason or practice squad member only

Awards and highlights
- 2× Super Bowl champion (XXVII, XXVIII); Second-team All-MAC (1988)

Career NFL statistics
- Rushing yards: 120
- Rushing average: 2.9
- Rushing touchdowns: 1
- Stats at Pro Football Reference

Derrick Luther Gainer (born August 15, 1966) is an American former professional football player who was a running back in the National Football League (NFL) for the Cleveland Browns, Los Angeles Raiders, and Dallas Cowboys. He played college football for the Florida A&M Rattlers. He is a two-time Super Bowl champion, winning them back-to-back with Dallas.

== Early life ==
Gainer attended Plant City High School. He received All-conference recognition as a senior running back. He accepted a football scholarship from Florida A&M University.

He suffered a knee injury during his sophomore season and had arthroscopic knee surgery. As a junior, he posted 235 rushing yards.

As a senior, he led the team with 126 carries for 627 rushing yards and 9 rushing touchdowns. He also led the Mideastern Athletic Conference in total touchdowns with 11. He finished his college career with 222 carries for 1,132 yards (5.1-yard avg.).

== Professional career ==
=== Los Angeles Raiders (first stint) ===
Gainer was selected by the Los Angeles Raiders in the eighth round (205th overall) of the 1989 NFL draft. Although officially it is recorded that the Raiders waived him before the start of the season, it was actually his decision to leave the team. On September 9, he was signed to the practice squad. He was released on November 29.

=== Cleveland Browns ===
On December 13, 1989, he was signed by the Cleveland Browns to their practice squad. In 1990, he made the regular season roster and played in all 16 games as a backup fullback, while leading the team with 18 special teams tackles. In the season opener he had 10 carries for 32 yards. His first start came in the second game against the New York Jets in place of an injured Kevin Mack, but he suffered a knee injury in the second half of the game. He was released on August 26, 1991.

=== Los Angeles Raiders (second stint) ===
In February 1992, he was signed as a free agent by the Los Angeles Raiders. On September 2, he was cut to make room for quarterback Vince Evans. He was later re-signed, making the team over Napoleon McCallum, only to be released once again on September 16, to make room for linebacker Tom Benson.

=== Dallas Cowboys ===
On October 15, 1992, he was signed as a free agent by the Dallas Cowboys to help on the special teams units, where he had 2 tackles. On November 23, he was placed on the injured reserve list with a strained right hamstring. He was re-activated on December 28.

After Curvin Richards was released for fumbling in the last regular season game against the Chicago Bears, Gainer was also used to backup Emmitt Smith during the playoff run to Super Bowl XXVII. In the playoff 34–10 win against the Philadelphia Eagles, he entered the fourth quarter, rushing for 29 yards and scored the last touchdown. He had 2 carries for one yard in relief of Smith during the Super Bowl.

In 1993, he got the opportunity to compete with rookie Derrick Lassic for the starting running back job, while Smith was in a contract holdout. He was the fourth-string running back and appeared in 11 games, making 3 special teams tackles. On May 10, 1994, he was traded to the Los Angeles Raiders in exchange for past considerations.

=== Los Angeles Raiders (third stint) ===
On August 28, 1994, Gainer was released by the Los Angeles Raiders.
