= Charles Henry Douglass =

American businessman

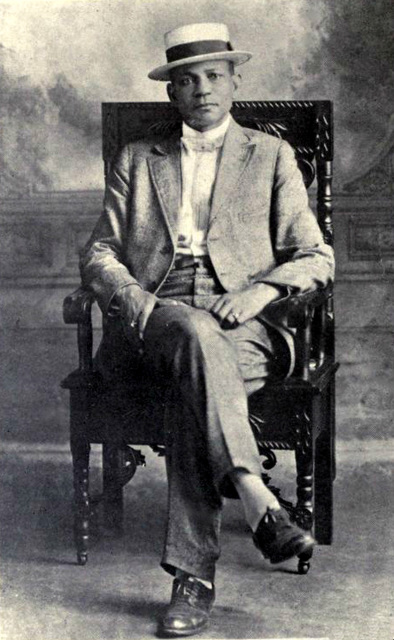
Photo of Charles Henry Douglass (from The National Cyclopedia of the Colored Race (vol. 1, 1919)).

Charles Henry Douglass (February 17, 1870 – April 30, 1940) was an American businessman in Macon, Georgia. He operated the Douglass Theatre. He was a very wealthy man in his time and was a great community leader for equality. He was very reputable in the arts, for he was a part of Theatre Owners Booking Association (T.O.B.A.) and managed the Florida Blossoms Minstrels and Comedy Company. He opened the Douglass Theatre in Macon, Georgia, and continued to be a prominent leader within his community. He ran his theatre until 1940 when he died. Throughout his life, Douglass made several contributions to his community and city. Ben Stein was reported to be the owner and manager of the theater in 1928. "Indeed, thanks to the vision of Charles Henry Douglass, the Douglass Theatre in Macon became a preeminent entertainment venue for African American Georgians outside of Atlanta. Today, with the restored Douglass Theatre again in operation, the inspiring legacy of Charles H. Douglass lives on in Macon".

== Early life ==
Charles Henry Douglass was born in February 1870 in Macon, Georgia. His father, Charles Douglass, was a former slave from Virginia who became a carpenter. Charles grew up with his father, his mother Ellen, and his two sisters in a one bedroom house that his father built. To supplement the family income, Charles worked at a very young age peddling wood and vegetables. He also chopped cotton for fifteen cents a day. Since a young age, Douglass had interest in the arts and theatre. After his parents died, he continued to work and supported his sisters until they married. Soon after his sisters were married he left Macon and worked a series of various jobs.

== Cultural background ==
Douglass was born in the fairly small city of Macon, Georgia. Macon is located in central Georgia and is a part of Bibb County. Macon has a vast history behind it and especially around Douglass' era. Andrew Manis, an author of Macon Black and White says, "In Macon, as elsewhere in the state, violence would be whites' first instrument in the effort to return blacks to their accustomed place". Thus showing that there was much unrest during this time period, and having the Douglass Theatre where African Americans could feel liberated through the arts.

== Work and political ties ==
In this time of severe racism and segregation, Douglass took pride in working and serving the black community of Macon. In 1898, Douglass worked in a bicycle rent and repair shop, and was successful until the rise of the automobile. Then in 1901, he became the director of the Georgia Loan and Savings Company, where he met his future wife Fannie Appling. Fannie was an employee there, working as an assistant cashier. Douglass continued working for the company for four more years and then began to invest in other businesses. One of his first investments was the Ocmulgee Park Theatre in which he operated from 1904 to 1906. The Ocmulgee Theatre is home to the Ocmulgee Symphony Orchestra. In 1906, he sold the Ocmulgee Theatre and bought another building on Broadway Street, which is one of the main streets in Macon. Before purchasing this new building he had already owned The Colonial Hotel which was located on the same street. Douglass went on to own several pieces of real estate on Broadway Street.

At this time in his life he really started to gain wealth and fame among the people of Macon. Douglass even became a member of the black chamber of commerce, and some would in which he was known as "…the city's wealthiest African American". Through this group he also helped organize various rallies, "They rallied black Maconites to meet on April 9, 1918 at the City Auditorium to collect money for the bond drive". With his growing power and authority during these racist times, Douglass was involved in many African American interest groups and gained positive fame from the black community as well as negative attention from the white community in Georgia. At one point, "the state Ku Klux Klan offered a $100 bounty on his head…". In fact, some describe him, "functioning as a wing of the Black Arts Movement". Some also say, "Charles H. Douglass…was Macon's most prominent African American business leader in the first half of the twentieth century" (Washington Memorial Library).

Douglass was a man who wanted to empower his community and stand up for what he believed in. There was one instance in which the Macon police chief arrested 30 men to explain why they were not active workers, and Douglass came to their defense. "Black business leader Charles H. Douglass pleaded for the release of the men, vouching for their characters and that they worked for some of the establishments along Broadway Street". This statement demonstrates Douglass' loyalty to his employees. Douglass then went on to organize and administer the "Florida Blossom Minstrels and Comedy Company" in 1907. However, in 1911 Douglass sold the company and management to one of his partners Peter Worthey. This was the start of Douglass' life in the theater industry.

== Florida Blossom Minstrels and Comedy Company / Theatre Owners Booking Association ==
The Florida Blossom Minstrels and Comedy Company were well known in its region. The company introduced Douglass to the main circuit of the most favored minstrel entertainers. The Company traveled to various locations performing and expanding their popularity. One of the more renowned members of the group was Pigmeat Markham. He received about $12.50 per week performing various songs and minstrel skits. The company really propelled Douglass in the industry and the experience greatly helped him with his later theatre endeavors.

== Theatre ==
Douglass opened his soon to be historical theatre in 1911. With Douglass' prior knowledge of performers and the entertainment business, the theatre grew into a great success rather rapidly. Douglass was a member of T.O.B.A. (Theatre Owners Bookers Association) and his membership greatly aided in the success of the booking many of African American artists and performers. The T.O.B.A. consisted of a series of 40 theatres that helped one another booking and scheduling the performers.

The theatre was a premier location for entertainment for African American citizens in Macon. It was a prime for its vaudeville hall along with its movie theatre. It was a common setting for early blues and jazz music. It showed several feature-length films subsequently became a much respected venue in the country for its time. It was also sometimes home to specific sporting events. In the 1920s it was the theatre was a significant venue for novel African American films. These films were written for black people and by black people. Most of the films supported the "by us, for us" ideal. Some musical artists that filled the stage were Duke Ellington and Cab Calloway. "When not hosting live acts, the Douglass also exhibited a wide variety of sound and silent motion pictures. Selected records feature race films (movies made specifically for African American audiences) of producers such as the Norman Film Manufacturing Company and Oscar Micheaux".

The theatre was also a common place for various groups to congregate in such a time of racial turbulence. Various black interest groups met there providing them with a respectively safe place. Later in 1999, the location served as a location for Ellis's town meetings and the panel discussions were aired live on local television stations.

The theater was managed by Douglass himself until 1940 when he died. However, the theatre was leased to Benjamin Stein,(incorrect link) a white business man for the short period between 1927 and 1929. After Douglass died, his wife and sons ran the theatre until it was closed in 1973.

After being latent for several years, the Theatre was saved and renovated by a non-profit group known as "Friends of the Douglass Theatre" in the 1990s. The renovation consisted of the installation of a new heating and cooling system, sound and cinema equipment with surround sound, formats, and state-of-the-art lighting. Additionally new seating was installed and the main annex was rejuvenated.

Currently, the theatre is home to the "Macon Film Guild at the Douglass Theatre". It is also home to Met Live in HD, a series of transmissions of live opera from the Metropolitan opera in New York City.

It is open to the public and continues to be a main attraction.

== Talent ==
Many famous artists and performers have had the honor of performing at the historical Douglass Theatre. In the early 1960s, the theatre was a great place for musicians and performers to showcase themselves. Some of the music talent that have performed there are Ma Rainey, Bessie Smith, Otis Redding, James Brown, Little Richard, and Pigmeat Markham. It also housed some renowned vaudeville shows. The Douglass was a home to diverse events, films, and entertainment performances for over 52 years. The Douglass currently continues to be a home to all races and events.

== Legacy ==
He is buried at Linwood Cemetery in Macon.
