= Theatre Owners Booking Association =

Vaudeville circuit for African American performers

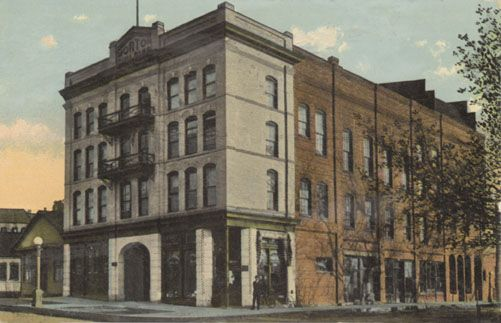
Morton Theatre, 1914

Theatre Owners Booking Association, or T.O.B.A., was the vaudeville circuit for African American performers in the 1920s. Most theaters had white owners though about a third of them had black owners. These included the restored Morton Theater in Athens, Georgia, originally operated by "Pinky"Monroe Morton, and Douglass Theatre in Macon, Georgia, then owned and operated by Charles Henry Douglass. Theater owners booked jazz and blues musicians and singers, comedians, and other performers, including the classically trained, such as operatic soprano Sissieretta Jones, known as "The Black Patti", for black audiences.

== History ==
The association was established following the work of vaudeville performer Sherman H. Dudley. By 1909, Dudley was commonly known as the "Lone Star Comedian" and had begun an attempt to have a black-owned and operated string of venues around the United States. By 1911, Dudley was based in Washington, D.C. as general manager and treasurer of the Colored Actors' Union, and set up S. H. Dudley Theatrical Enterprises, which began buying and leasing theaters around Washington and Virginia.

By 1916, the "Dudley Circuit" had extended into the south and Midwest, enabling black entertainers to secure longer-term contracts for an extended season; this circuit provided the basis for T.O.B.A. His circuit was advertised in a weekly column published in black newspapers, "What's What on the Dudley's Circuit", and by 1914 it included over twenty theaters, "all owned or operated by blacks and as far south as Atlanta."

T.O.B.A. was formally established in 1920 by people associated with Dudley's circuit. Its President was Milton Starr, owner of the Bijou Theatre in Nashville; its chief booker was Sam Reevin of Chattanooga. The organization had more than 80 theaters at its peak in the early to mid 1920s.

Often referred to by the black performers as Tough on Black Artists (or, by Gertrude "Ma" Rainey, as Tough on Black Asses), the association was generally known as Toby Time (Time was a common term for vaudeville circuits). It booked only black artists into a series of theatres on the East Coast and as far west as Oklahoma. T.O.B.A. venues were the only ones south of the Mason–Dixon line that regularly sought black audiences, according to one reference. T.O.B.A. paid less and generally had worse touring arrangements, which the performers had to pay for themselves, than the white vaudeville counterpart. T.O.B.A. became less successful as the Great Depression struck, collapsing in late 1930 when Dudley sold his chain of theaters to a cinema company.

== Operations and performers ==
Its earliest star performers included singers Ethel Waters, Gertrude Ma Rainey, Bessie Smith, Edmonia Henderson, Mamie Smith, Minto Cato and Adelaide Hall; comedian Tim Moore with his Chicago Follies company (which included his wife Gertie); the Whitman Sisters and their Company; musicians Fletcher Henderson, Fats Waller, Louis Armstrong, Noble Sissle, Eubie Blake, Joe "King" Oliver, and Duke Ellington; comedians Sandy Burns, Salem Whitney Tutt, Boots Hope, Seymour James, and Tom Fletcher; future Paris sensation Josephine Baker; songwriter and pianist Perry Bradford, the mime Johnny Hudgins; dancers U. S. Thompson, Walter Batie, Earl "Snakehips" Tucker, and Valaida Snow; and many others. In addition, later well-known names such as Florence Mills, Lincoln "Stepin Fetchit" Perry, Hattie McDaniel, Mantan Moreland, Jackie "Moms" Mabley, Dewey Pigmeat Markham, Johnny Lee, Marshall "Garbage" Rogers, Amanda Randolph, Chick Webb, Cab Calloway, a young William Basie (before he came to be called "Count") on tour with Gonzelle White, and four-year-old Sammy Davis Jr. all performed on the T.O.B.A. circuit.

According to writer Preston Lauterbach, "a basic TOBA troupe carried about all the variety a single stage could hold, not to mention all the personalities one sleeping car could hold", including tap dancers, comedy teams, actors, and blues singers. Their backdrops, costumes and props moved with them.

The most prestigious black theaters in Harlem, Philadelphia, and Washington, D.C., were not part of the circuit, booking acts independently; the T.O.B.A. was considered less prestigious. Many black performers, such as Bert Williams, George Walker, Johnson and Dean, Bill "Bojangles" Robinson, Irving Jones, Tim Moore, and Johnny Hudgins, also performed in white vaudeville, often in blackface.

== See also ==
- Bijou Amusement Company
- Black Vaudeville
