= Eugene Francis Suttle =

Suttle in 1986.

Eugene Francis Suttle (1909–1989) served as the Comptroller and Auditor General for the Republic of Ireland from 1964 to 1973. The Arms Crisis of 1970, which involved the alleged misuse of government funds by two cabinet ministers, occurred during Mr. Suttle's tenure. Although he was not directly involved in the crisis, he was an ex officio member of the Dáil Public Accounts Committee inquiring into it in 1971.
