= His Great Chance =

1923 movie directed by Ben Strasser

His Great Chance is a 1923 film directed by Ben Strasser. It is a 5-reel feature film The film starred Tim Moore as well as Gertie Brown. It is a lost film. A comedy, Leigh Whipper wrote it was the best of the African American films he had seen. D. Ireland Thomas was less favorable and blamed poor direction for a missed opportunity. Theater owner W. S. Scales of North State Films served as a producer for the film.

Moore worked in various shows performing comedy routines in blackface.
