= Lucky Sambo =

1925 musical comedy

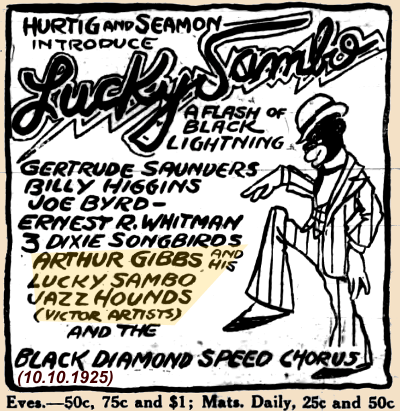
Advertisement for Lucky Sambo published October 10, 1925

Lucky Sambo was a 1925 musical comedy staged on Broadway. It originally toured as Aces and Queens in 1923 and 1924. It was by Porter Grainger and Freddy Johnson. It played at the Colonial Theatre (New York City).

Time magazine described it as an imitator of Shuffle Along. A June 8, 1925 New York Times write-up for it at the Colonial Theatre called it an amusing and "agile entertainment". A 1925 advertisement ran for it at the New Hyperion theater. The ad touted it as "The Black Streak of Lightning" and "The World's Fastest Show".

It starred Billy Higgins and Joe Byrd. They were also together in Midnight Steppers in 1927.

Ernest Whitman appeared in a touring version of the show.

== Cast ==
- Billy Higgins
- Joe Byrd
- 3 Dixie Song Birds (including Amanda Randolph and Hilda Perleno)
- Ernest Whitman
- Jim Vaughn and His Jazz Hands
- 30 High Yellows
- 20 Seal Skinned Browns

== See also ==
- Jesse A. Shipp
- Johnny Hudgins
- Gertie Brown
