= Joe Byrd (vaudeville) =

American vaudeville comedian

Joe Byrd was an American vaudeville comedian. He was from Jacksonville, Florida.

The Indianapolis Freeman gave him plaudits in 1914 for his role with "Birdie" Byrd in the duo Byrd & Byrd. He and Billy Higgins starred in Black Sambo in 1925 and Midnight Steppers in 1927.

== Shows ==
- My Friend from Kentucky (1913/1914)
- Let 'Em Have It (1923), co-starring with Billy Ewing
- Aces and Queens
- Lucky Sambo (1925)
- Ace High Revue (1927)
- Midnight Steppers (1927)
- Harlem Darlings (1929)
- Blackbirds of 1939 (1939)
- Harlem Cavalcade (1942)
