= Douglass Theatre =

Historical theatre in Macon, Georgia

Coordinates: 32.83547°N 83.62579°W

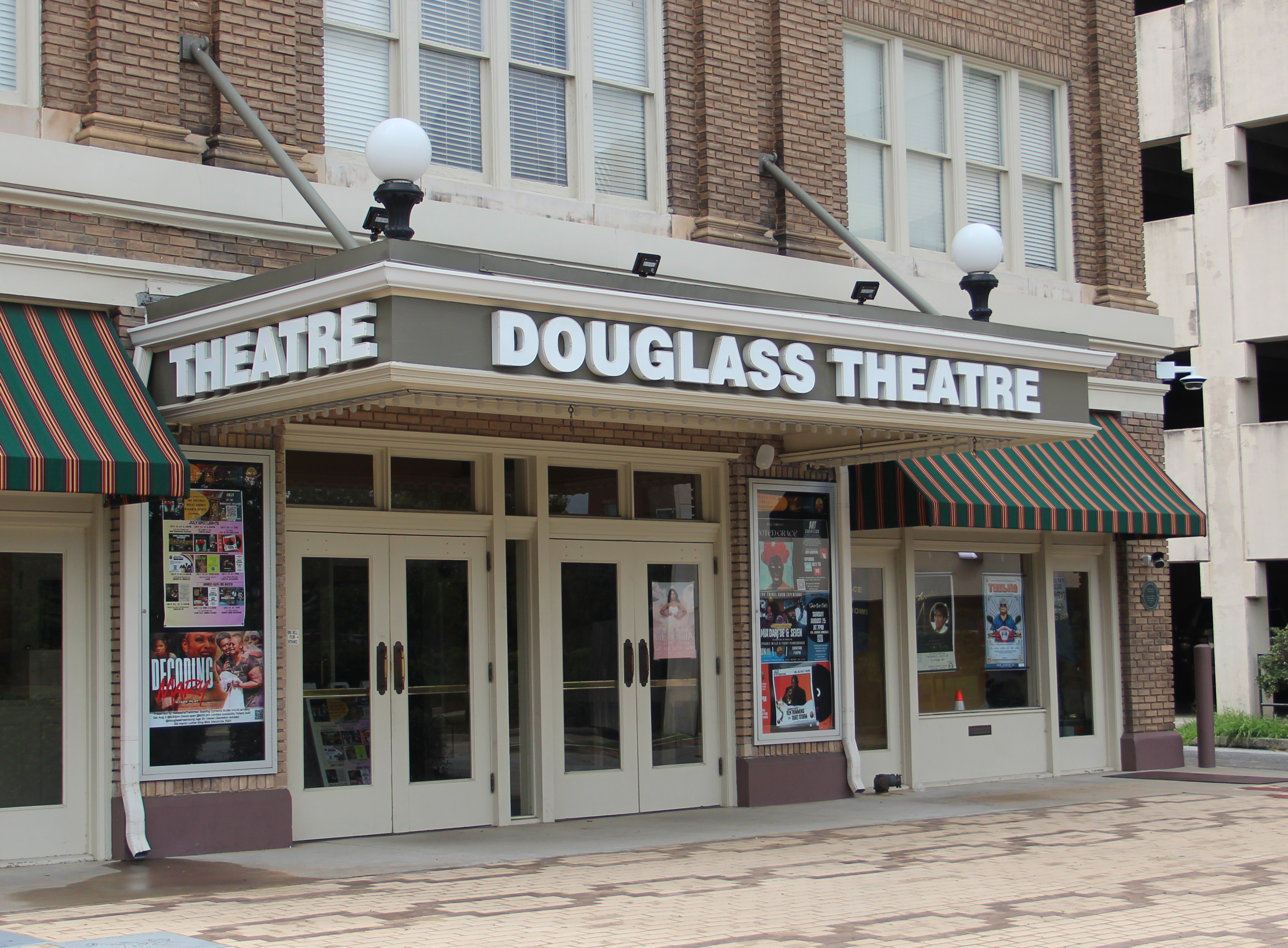
The Douglass Theatre in 2024

The Douglass Theatre is a theatre in Macon, Georgia. It was founded in 1921 by Charles Henry Douglass, an African-American entrepreneur who was an established theatre developer well versed in the vaudeville and entertainment business. Ben Stein owned and managed the theater in 1928. According to the Douglass Theatre website, the Douglass was a part of the Theater Owners Booking Association – a chain of 40 theatres that served as an agency for many African American artists and performers.

The theatre remained in operation until the 1970s. It was dormant for many years before being saved from demolition in the 1990s by a community group that became the non-profit "Friends of the Douglass Theatre". A major renovation added central heating and air throughout the complex. State of the art stage lighting, sound and cinema equipment (including 35mm and 70 mm film formats with digital surround sound) were also added. New seating was installed and a portion of the first level was converted to an entrance lobby and waiting area to the annex area.

An early artist's rendering of the annex shows a three-story building. However, the annex is a single-story structure.

The theatre hosts many public and private events and parties, and serves as the viewing venue for the Macon Film Guild at the Douglass Theatre, which shows select foreign and independent films.
