= William Selig =

American film producer (1864–1948)

William Nicholas Selig
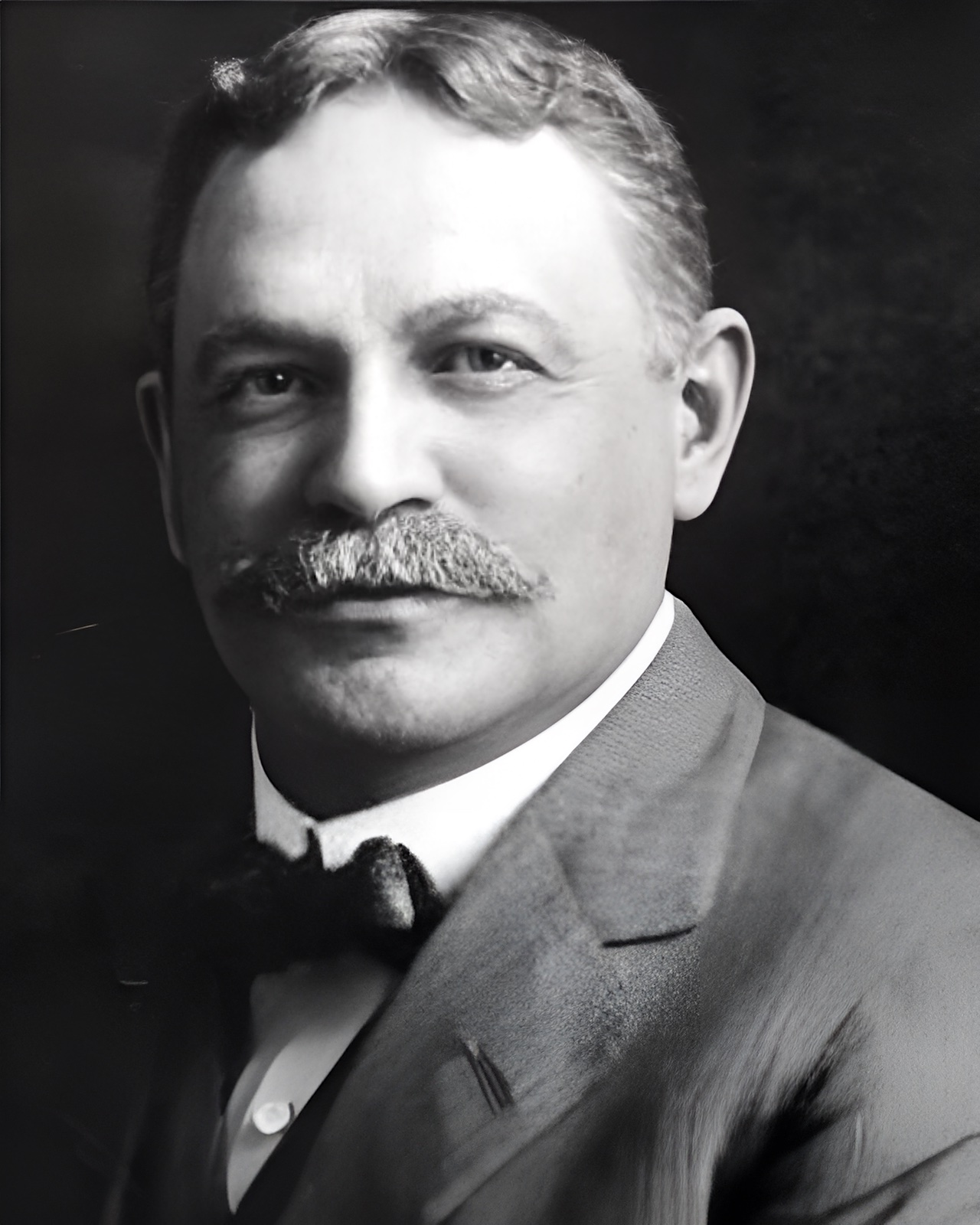
- Selig in 1916
- Born: March 14, 1864; Chicago, Illinois, U.S.
- Died: July 16, 1948 (aged 84); Los Angeles, California, U.S.
- Other names: "Colonel" Selig; Col. William N. Selig; Col. William Selig; W.N. Selig; William N. Selig; Wm. N. Selig

William Nicholas Selig (March 14, 1864 – July 16, 1948) was a vaudeville performer and pioneer of the American motion picture industry. His stage billing as Colonel Selig would be used for the rest of his career, even as he moved into film production.

Born to immigrant parents living in Chicago, Selig apprenticed as an upholsterer, but got his start in vaudeville, touring the Midwest as a magician's assistant. Creating his own magic act, Colonel Selig toured the country and produced a touring vaudeville show, Selig’s Mastodon Minstrels, based in San Francisco.

In 1896, Selig created one of the first film production companies, Selig Polyscope Company of Chicago. He produced a string of commercially successful films in the early years of the film industry. His The Tramp and the Dog (1896) is considered the first narrative film set in Chicago. Selig may have made the first narrative film shot in Los Angeles, The Count of Monte Cristo (1908), and in 1909, in a corporate expansion established the first permanent L.A. studio, in Edendale, Los Angeles.

Selig also produced the first Wizard of Oz film in 1910, the first two-reeler (about 20 minutes) film, Damon and Pythias (1908), and the first true serial, The Adventures of Kathlyn (1913–1914).

== Early life ==
William Nicholas Selig was born March 14, 1864, at 10 Kramer Street, Chicago, Illinois, to Antonia (née Linsky) and Joseph Franz Selig, a German-speaking immigrant family, in a predominantly Polish section of Chicago and attended primary school there.

== Early career ==
William N. Selig entered show business as "Selig the Conjurer" and morphed into the impresario of "Selig's Mastodon Minstrels," which featured Bert Williams, along with "five whites, four blacks, and a Mexican' who drove the horse team and played trombone" and then into the owner of the Selig Polyscope Company that made and licensed projection equipment.

Selig started as a furniture upholsterer. Selig apprenticed to a magician, and, still a teen, toured the Midwest as a vaudeville performer in his own minstrel show. He later settled in San Francisco and toured the state as "Selig the Conjurer." One of the actors was Bert Williams, who went on to become a leading African-American entertainer.

As a magician, Selig called himself "Professor Selig", later awarding himself the title of Colonel.

== Multiscope and Film Company ==
A mechanic to whom Selig turned for help had unknowingly made a duplicate Cinématographe for a travelling Lumière operator, and Selig's camera and Polyscope projector were based on the drawings of the Lumière machine.

In 1894, at the Texas State Fair in Dallas, Texas, Selig met employees from Thomas Edison’s laboratory who were demonstrating the Kinetoscope. He returned to Chicago, opened a small photography studio and began investigating how he might make his own moving pictures without paying a patent fee to Edison's company. Selig reportedly found a metalworker who had unwittingly repaired a Lumière brothers motion picture camera and, with his help, developed a working system. With machinist Andrew Schutsek, he produced a similarity to the cinématographe. In 1896, Selig founded the Selig Polyscope Company in Chicago, producing not only motion pictures but also film equipment, as one of the first motion picture studios in America, making actuality shorts, travelogues and industrial films for Chicago businesses.

Multiscope & Film Company gained a five year franchise in 1895 with the Edison Vitagraph Company of Chicago and New York to show the first moving pictures in the State of Minnesota and gained rights from the holder of Wisconsin’s franchisee to operate the first Vitagraph moving picture shows in Burlington and Elkhorn, making Burlington the first place outside of the largest metropolitan American cities in which the Vitascope was exhibited.

In 1896, in a loft, at 43 Peck Court in Burlington, Wisconsin, Selig co-founded his first film company, the Multiscope and Film Company, and his made first film, The Tramp and the Dog.

Selig also copied the productions of others, like other pioneer companies, for his sale, through his own catalogues, his activity brought the attention of the lawyers of Edison. Selig made films in the Southwest.

=== Al-Vista panoramic camera ===
Multiscope and Film Company produced, in Burlington, Wisconsin, the first successful commercial 180-degree panoramic camera made in quantity, the Al-Vista, later a series of panoramic still cameras.

== Selig Polyscope Company ==
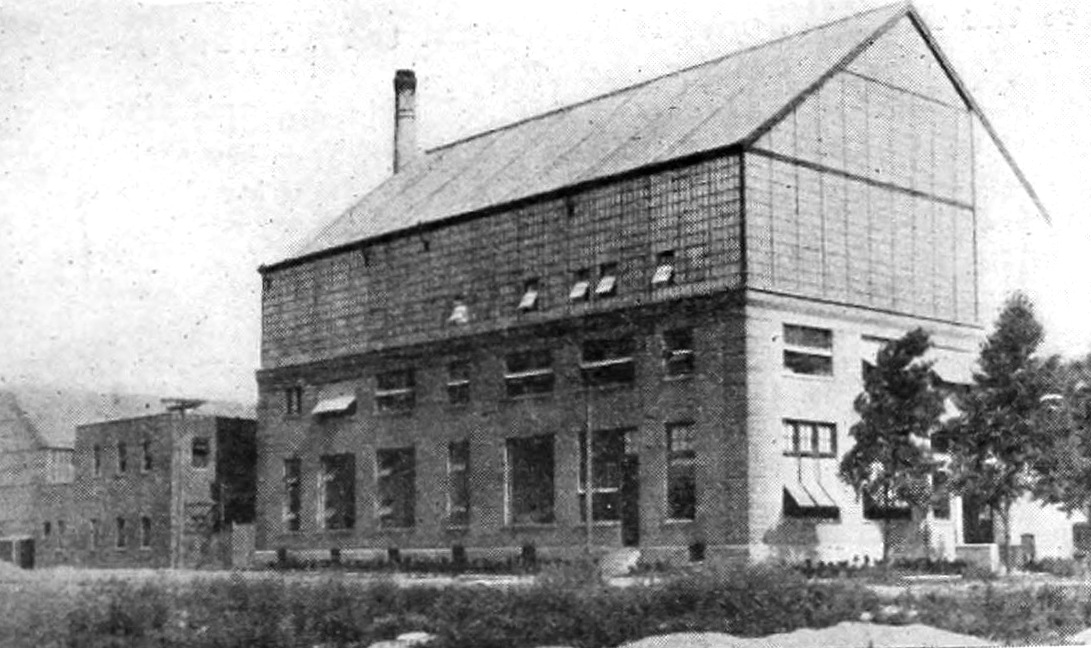
Selig studio, Chicago, The Moving Picture World, July 1916

In November 1900, Selig incorporated the Selig Polyscope Company. By 1904, he focused on slapstick comedies and minstrel-comic scenes, and producing the first Westerns of Broncho Billy Anderson, the later co-founder of Essanay Studios. In 1909, Selig was the first producer to expand filmmaking operations to the West Coast, where he set up studio facilities in the Edendale area of Los Angeles with director Francis Boggs. Southern California's weather allowed outdoor filming for most of the year and offered varied geography and settings which could stand in for far-flung locations around the world. Los Angeles also seemed to offer geographical isolation from Edison's Motion Picture Patents Company (MPPC), a cartel which Selig later reluctantly joined. The Sergeant, a Western short shot in Yosemite and produced and directed by Boggs for the Selig Polyscope Company was released in September 1910.

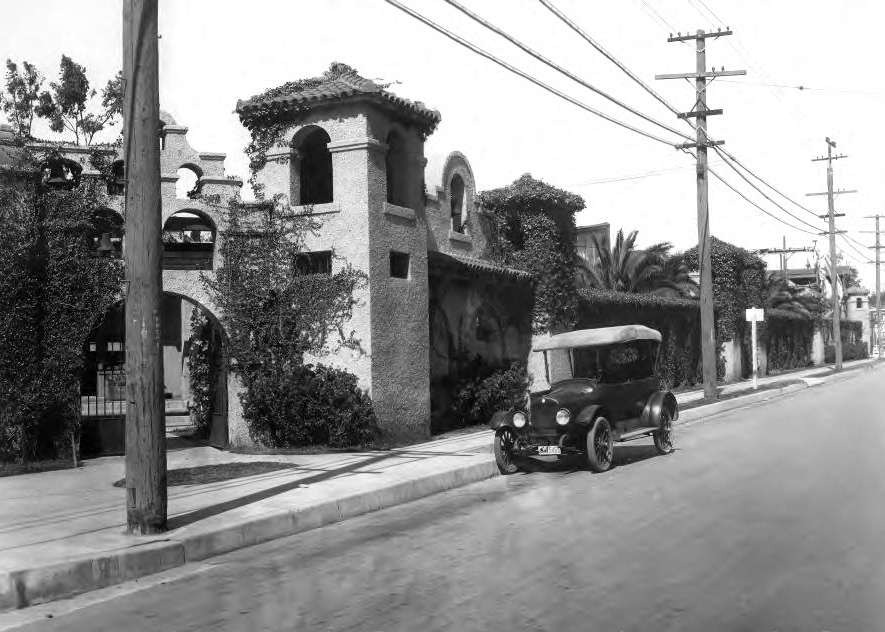
Street view of Selig's studio in Los Angeles, c. 1910.

In 1911, Boggs was murdered by a Japanese gardener employed by the company. Selig was shot and wounded in the arm while trying to defend him.

Settling with Edison, Selig joined the Motion Picture Patents Company and in 1913 joined with Vitagraph, Lubin and Essanay to form the V-L-S-E, Incorporated distribution company; prominent productions included Hunting Big Game in Africa 1909, a studio-made film of Theodore Roosevelt's exploits on safari; The Coming of Columbus 1912, a three-reeler which won a medal from Pope Pius X; and The Adventures of Kathlyn 1913, the first serial with Kathlyn Williams. Selig had studios in Chicago and the Edendale, Los Angeles, and produced animal pictures, with the Selig's Jungle Zoo near Eastlake Park growing to the then-largest collection of 700+ wild animals.

Selig produced almost a thousand movies and was responsible for developing new film talent such as Roscoe Arbuckle along with early cowboy western stars Gilbert M. "Bronco Billy" Anderson and Tom Mix. He also popularized the cliffhanger format through the serial (film) The Adventures of Kathlyn (1913). The Spoilers (1914), a western set in Alaska, is often cited as his greatest success.

In 1915, the United States Supreme Court nullified all of Edison's MPPC patents, breaking the cartel and allowing increased competition.

== Shakespeare publicity ==
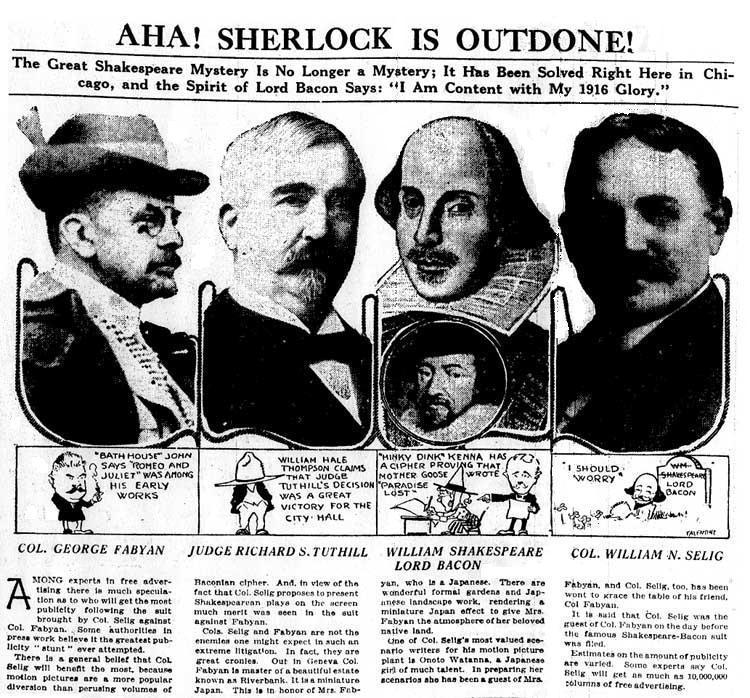
"Shakespeare trial", 1916, Chicago Tribune, Selig (right)

In 1916, Selig sued George Fabyan on the grounds that profits from forthcoming films of Shakespeare's works, along with a film on "The Life of Shakespeare", would be damaged by Fabyan's assertion that Francis Bacon was the real author of Shakespeare's work, a popular claim at the time. He had already obtained an injunction stopping the publication of a book by Fabyan on the subject, in which Fabyan promoted the discovery of ciphers in Shakespeare's plays, identified in his private laboratory Fabyan Villa. Selig was hoping to capitalize on the celebrations organized for the upcoming 300th anniversary of Shakespeare's death, scheduled for April 1916. A Cook County Circuit Court judge, Richard Tuthill, found against Shakespeare. He determined that the ciphers identified by Fabyan's analyst Elizabeth Wells Gallup were authentic and that Francis Bacon was therefore the author of the works. Damages of $5,000 were awarded to Fabyan for the interference with the publication of the book. In the ensuing uproar, Tuthill rescinded his decision, and another judge, Judge Frederick A. Smith, dismissed the ruling.

It was later suggested by the press that the case was concocted by both parties for publicity, since Selig and Fabyan were known to be old friends. An official of the Selig Company was quoted as saying, about the initial loss of the case, "Isn't that sad. That will be about nine million columns of publicity, won't it?"

== After Selig Polyscope ==
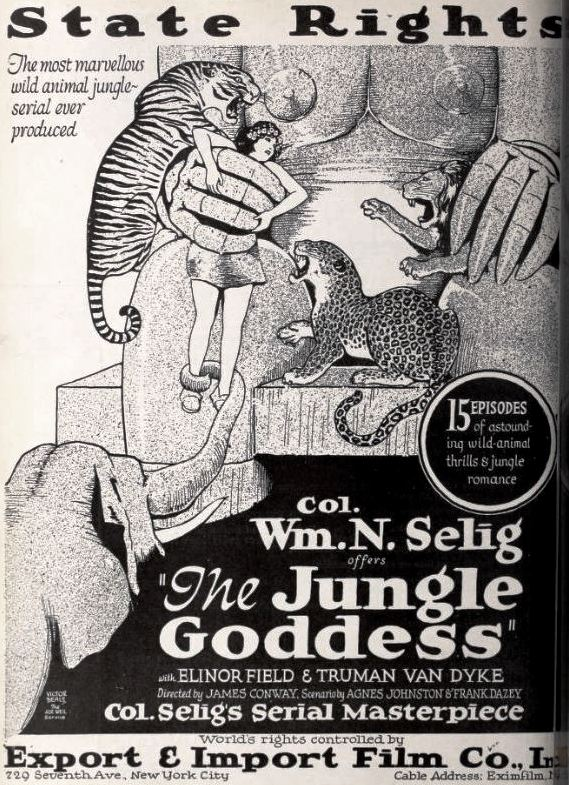
The Jungle Goddess (pt) (1922), advertisement for the serial

At great expense, Selig created a zoo in East Los Angeles, stocked with hundreds of animals he had collected for his studio's jungle pictures and cliffhangers. He also moved his studio there. Meanwhile, World War I began cutting into profits from Selig Polyscope's extensive European operations and, as the war ended, the film industry moved towards more expensively produced full-length feature films. Under these circumstances, Selig Polyscope was unable to compete and closed in 1918.

Nonetheless, Selig had great hopes for the zoo. Over thirty years before Walt Disney built Disneyland, Selig made plans to expand it into a major amusement park and resort called Selig Zoo Park, with many mechanical rides, a hotel, a large swimming area, theaters and restaurants, believing thousands of visitors a day would flock to the location. As head zookeeper he hired Cy DeVry, who had been director of the Lincoln Park Zoo in Chicago. However, only a single carousel was ever built and the crowds never came. A business which ten years earlier had been one of the most prolific and widely known movie studios in the world had, in effect, become a struggling zoo on the other side of downtown Los Angeles from Hollywood's booming post-World War I film industry. Although for a time he was able to rent space on the lot for wild animal "location" shooting and other projects, this side of the business quickly dwindled into an animal rental service.

Selig did some work as an independent producer and expedition promoter into the 1930s, but ultimately lost the zoo and his assets during the Great Depression. He then became a literary agent, re-selling story rights to film properties he had produced or acquired years before.

== Partial filmography ==
see: fr:William Selig

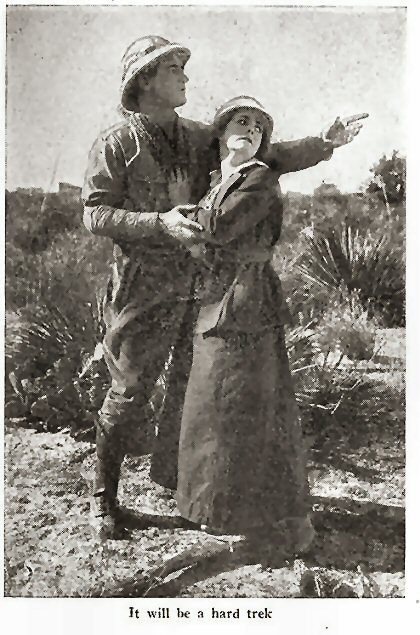
The Adventures of Kathlyn, 1913, Selig Polyscope

- The Tramp and the Dog, 1896
- Soldiers at Play, 1898
- Something Good – Negro Kiss 1898
- Chicago Police Parade, 1901
- Dewey Parade, 1901
- Gans-McGovern Fight, 1901
- A Hot Time on a Bathing Beach, 1903
- Business Rivalry, 1903
- Chicago Fire Run, 1903
- Chicago Firecats on Parade, 1903
- The Girl in Blue, 1903
- Trip Around The Union Loop, 1903
- View of State Street, 1903
- Humpty Dumpty, 1904
- The Tramp Dog, 1904
- The Grafter, 1907
- The Count of Monte Cristo, 1908
- Damon and Pythias, 1908
- The Fairylogue and Radio-Plays, 1908
- Hunting Big Game in Africa, 1909
- The Wonderful Wizard of Oz, 1910
- Lost in the Arctic, 1911
- Life on the Border, 1911
- The Coming of Columbus, 1911
- Brotherhood of Man, 1912
- Kings Forest, 1912
- War Time Romance, 1912
- The Adventures of Kathlyn 1913
- Arabia, the Equine Detective, 1913
- The Sheriff of Yavapai County, 1913
- The Spoilers, 1914
- A Black Sheep, 1915
- The Crisis, 1915
- House of a Thousand Candles, 1915
- The Man from Texas, 1915
- The Range Girl and the Cowboy, 1915
- The Garden of Allah, 1916
- The Ne'er-Do-Well (1916). re-released in 1921.
- In the Days of Daring, 1916. directed by and starring Tom Mix, re-released as Days of Daring in 1920 by Aywon Film Corporation.
- The City of Purple Dreams, 1918
- Little Orphant Annie, 1918
- The Lost City (it) (Serial film, 1920, Selig Polyscope Company & Warner Brothers)
- Sic-Em (1920, William N. Selig Productions)
- The Fighting Stranger (1921, William N. Selig Productions & Canyon Pictures Corporation (pt))
- The Hunger of the Blood (1921, William N. Selig Productions & Canyon Pictures Corporation (pt))
- The Last Chance (1921, William N. Selig Productions & Canyon Pictures Corporation (pt))
- The Struggle (1921, William N. Selig Productions & Canyon Pictures Corporation (pt))
- The Raiders (1921, William N. Selig Productions & Canyon Pictures Corporation (pt))
- Kazan (1921, William N. Selig Productions)
- pt:Miracles of the Jungle (1921, Selig Studios & Warner Brothers)
- The Better Man (1921, Selig-Rork Productions)
- The Fighting Breed (1921, Selig-Rork Productions)
- The Shadow of Lightning Ridge (1921, Selig-Rork Productions)
- The Rosary (1922, Selig-Rork Productions)
- Pals in Blue (1924, Col. Wm. N. Selig)
- The Jungle Goddess (pt)(1922, Col. Wm. N. Selig & Warner Brothers)

== Legacy ==
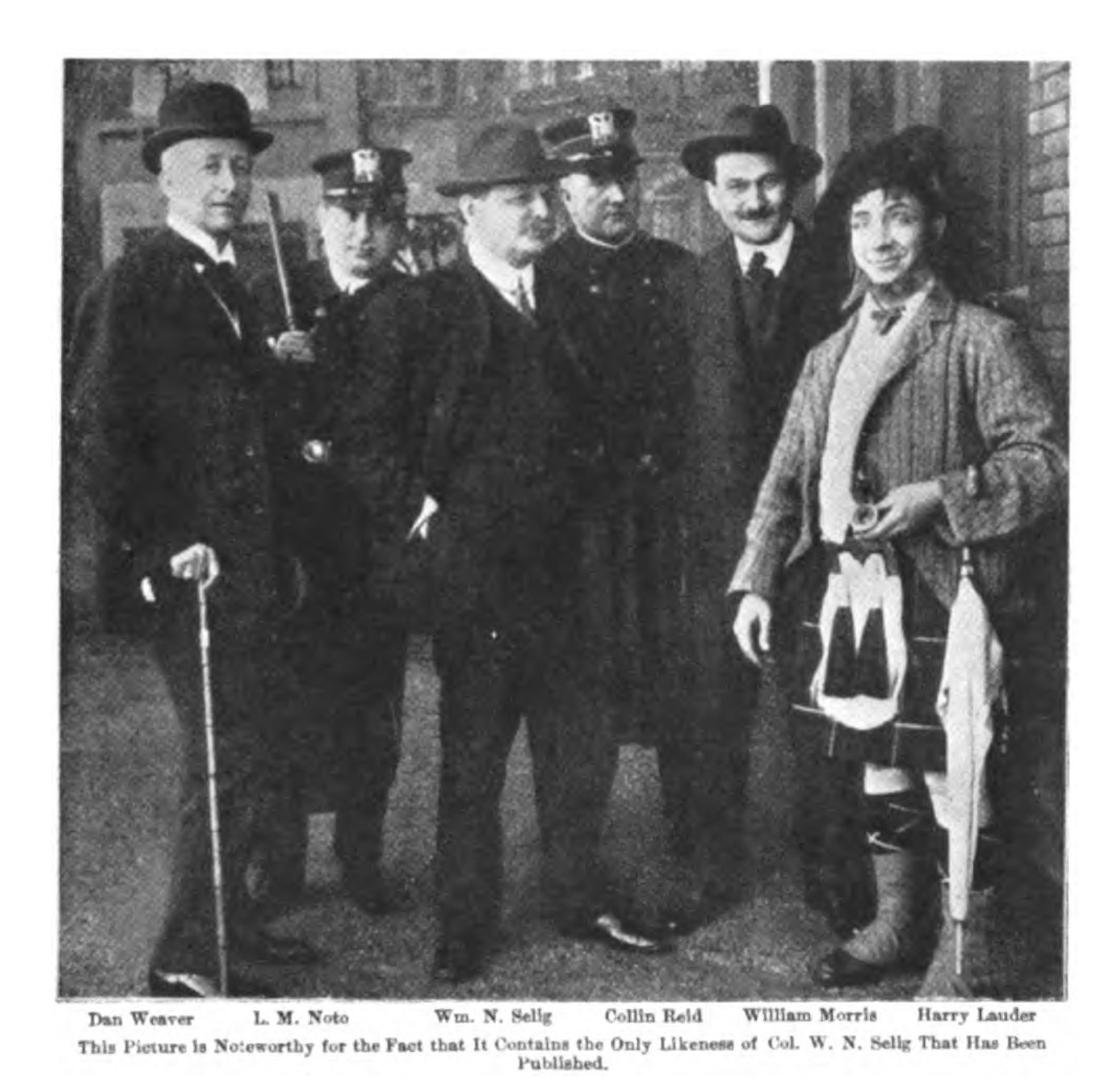
Selig and Harry Lauder

For his contributions to the motion picture industry, William Selig has a star on the Hollywood Walk of Fame at 6116 Hollywood Boulevard. In 1947, Selig and several other early movie producers and directors shared a special Academy Honorary Award to acknowledge their role in building the film industry.

== Personal life ==
Selig married Mary Holdeness Pinkham (1875–1956). Selig retired and ceased most film production in 1918, due to the same poor health that had sent him to California in 1893. Selig continued some independent film production and sponsored mountaineering expeditions and explorers. William Selig died on July 16, 1948. His ashes were stored in the Hall of Memory Columbarium at the Chapel of the Pines Crematory in Los Angeles.

== See also ==
- Internationale Camera Actiengesellschaft Polyscope cameras
