= Gem Theater (New Orleans) =

Historic movie theater building in New Orleans

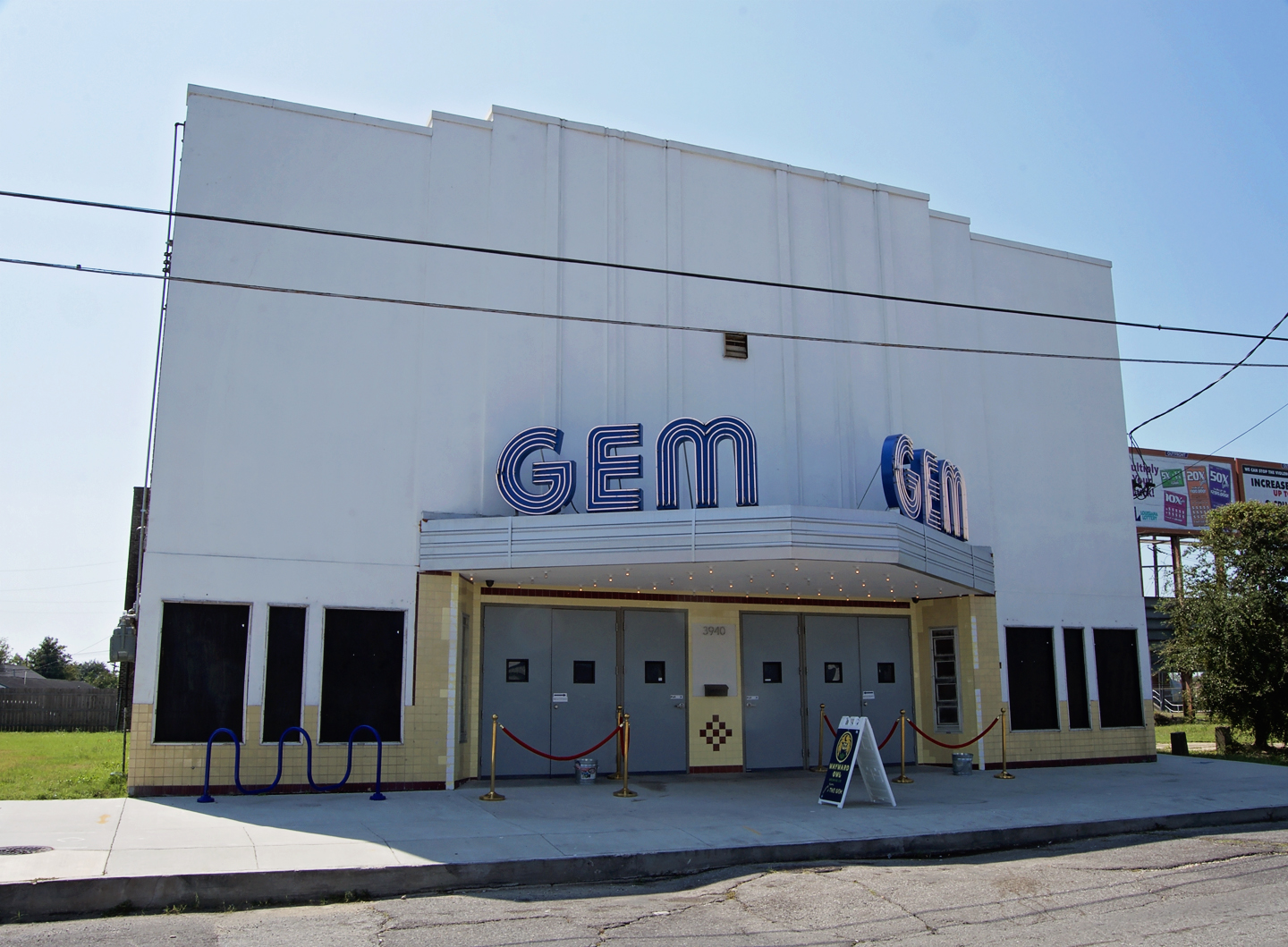
- Building with restored marquee in 2017
- Interactive map of Gem Theater
- Address: 3940 Thalia Street; New Orleans, Louisiana 70125
- Capacity: 1,000
- Type: Movie theater
- Current use: Microbrewery, beer garden, and event space

Construction
- Opened: 1951
- Closed: 1960
- Reopened: 2016 (Adaptive reuse)

Website
- Gem Theater
- U.S. National Register of Historic Places
- Location within Louisiana Location within the United States
- Coordinates: 29°57′08″N 90°05′51″W
- Area: Broadmoor, New Orleans
- Built by: Bijou Amusement Company
- Architect: Felix Julius Dreyfous and Solis Seiferth
- Architectural firm: Dreyfous and Seiferth
- Architectural style: Modern Movement, Art Moderne, Art Deco
- NRHP reference No.: 15001002
- Added to NRHP: January 26, 2016

The Gem Theater is a historic African American movie theater building in the B. W. Cooper neighborhood of New Orleans, Louisiana. The National Register of Historic Places listed the 1951 building which most recently housed the Zony Mash Beer Project.

== History ==
The Gem was conceived in 1948 by the Bijou Amusement Company of Memphis, Tennessee and opened in 1951. Having a theater specifically for African-American residents in their own neighborhood meant that customers weren't relegated to one section with inferior amenities, like in segregated theaters that were ubiquitous at the time. The business plan especially called for serving tenants of the nearby B.W. Cooper Housing Development.

The front of the screen included a small stage where a number of prominent African-American performers appeared including jazz trumpeter Avery "Kid" Howard, comedian Onnie "Lollypop" Jones, and jazz singer Alton Purnell. Professional baseball player Roy "Campy" Campanella and his team members competed in a quiz show at the Gem in front of hundreds of African-American children.

As a result of new competition with recently desegregated theaters downtown, the Gem closed in 1960. Radio station WBOK bought it later that year for $65,000 to convert it into a studio, but those plans never materialized. Meyer's Auto Parts later bought the building and added a storefront facing Broad Street, using the theater space as a warehouse. Hurricane Katrina damaged the structure in 2005. The building sat vacant and, by 2014, the city scheduled it for demolition.

In 2011, the New Orleans Historic District Landmarks Commission designated the building as a municipal landmark. Gregory Ensslen, a local developer, later purchased it with a microbrewery and tap room in mind. However, at that time, the zoning laws of New Orleans did not allow such a business outside industrial areas; the city made an exception for microbreweries making less than 12,500 barrels a year.

Wayward Owl Brewing opened in 2016, but left the building two years later with plans to brew elsewhere. In 2019, the Zony Mash Beer Experience opened in the space also as a microbrewery, with live entertainment, food trucks, beer garden and tap room, which can only sell the beer made on site. The business is named after the Zony Mash album by The Meters, a local funk band. Zony Mash closed its doors in spring of 2025, leading the way for the buildings conversion to a baseball-focused training and amusement venue in 2026.

== Architecture ==
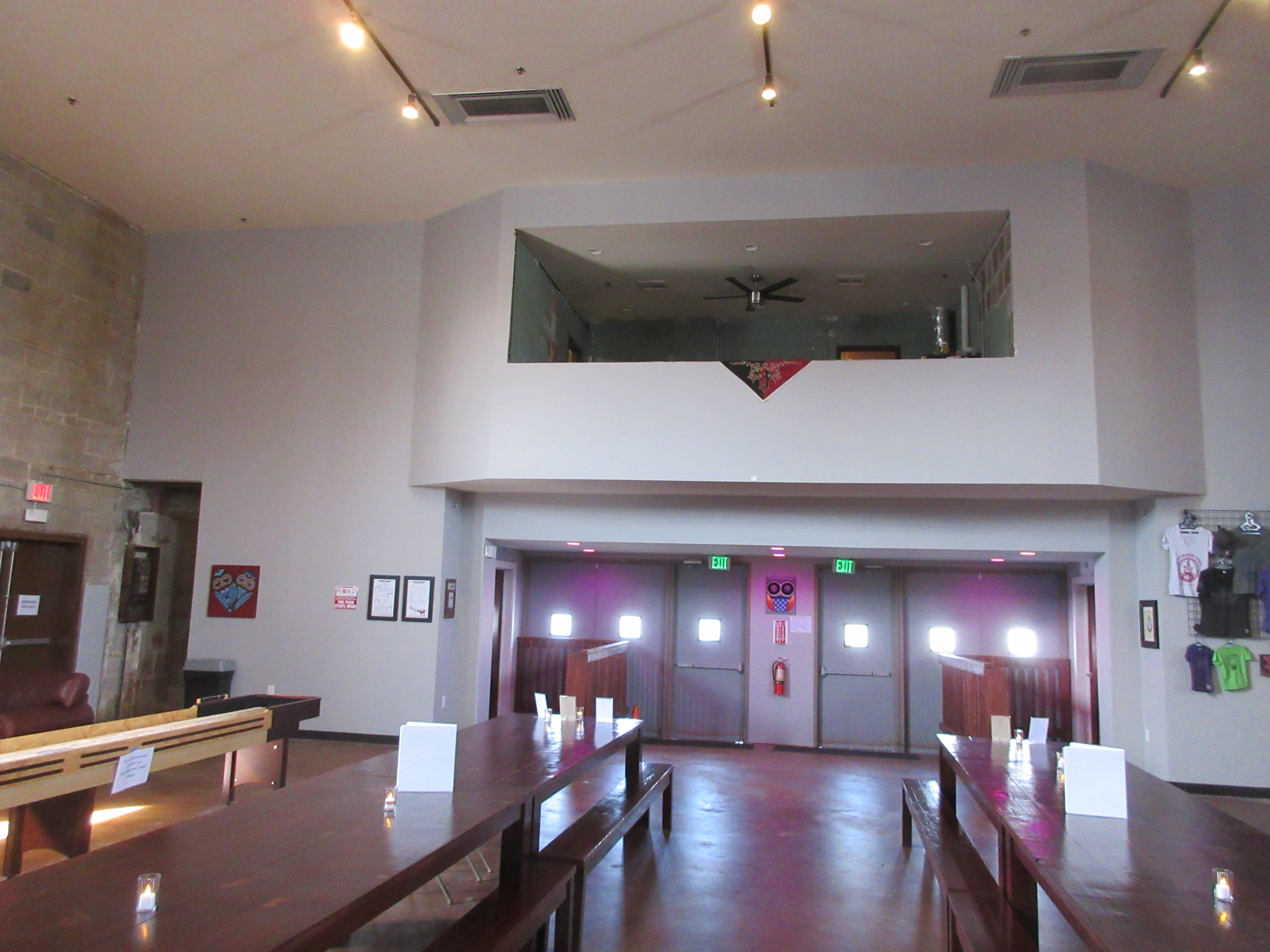
Renovated interior showing front entrance below the mezzanine

Prominent local architects Felix Julius Dreyfous and Solis Seiferth designed the building in 1948. They previously worked on designing Charity Hospital and the new Louisiana State Capitol.

The building style has been alternately described as Modern Movement, Art Moderne, and Art Deco. Prior to restoration, the building survived prolonged periods of neglect but survived thanks to sturdy masonry construction and deep foundation pilings.

The two-story brick building sits on a cement foundation with a stucco front. That facade includes yellow and maroon tiles along the base, raised vertical bands on the middle portion, and steps along the roofline. A recessed central bay includes three doors on each side of where a box office once stood. On each side of the entrance are three movie poster openings.

The exterior is dominated by a large polygonal aluminum marquee projecting from the building with two "GEM" neon signs. The original blue signs were lost but were reproduced based on memories of residents since only black and white photographs were available.

In the interior, none of the original seating, flooring, or ceiling remain due to water damage and neglect. Part of what makes the Gem distinctive is the lack of features common in segregated theaters of the period: there is no separate ticket booth with stairs bypassing the main lobby leading to the upper balcony with fewer amenities.

The intact second floor mezzanine, which previously included the projector room, is now rented for private events. While the Wayward Owl ran the brewing equipment prominently down the center of the interior, Zony Mash reconfigured the interior layout to create a large open space for events.

== See also ==
- List of breweries in Louisiana
- National Register of Historic Places listings in Orleans Parish, Louisiana
