= Bijou Amusement Company =

Theater company

Bijou Amusement Company was a movie theater business in the United States. It was headquartered in Nashville, Tennessee. Its Bijou Theatre in Nashville was one of the premiere venues for African American audiences in the Southern United States. Milton Starr, who was part of the prominent Jewish family that owned and ran the theater, was the first president of the Theater Owners Booking Association (TOBA), headquartered in Chattanooga. Performers who starred at the theater included Bessie Smith, Mamie Smith, Ma Rainey, Lafayette Players, Butterbeans and Susie, Ethel Waters, and Irvin C. Miller’s Brown Skin Models. Boxers Tiger Flowers and Sam Langford had bouts at the venue. The theater and a Masonic lodge next door were razed in the 1950s as part of an urban renewal plan and replaced by the city’s Municipal Auditorium. The fight to save the theater reached the U.S. Supreme Court.

== History ==
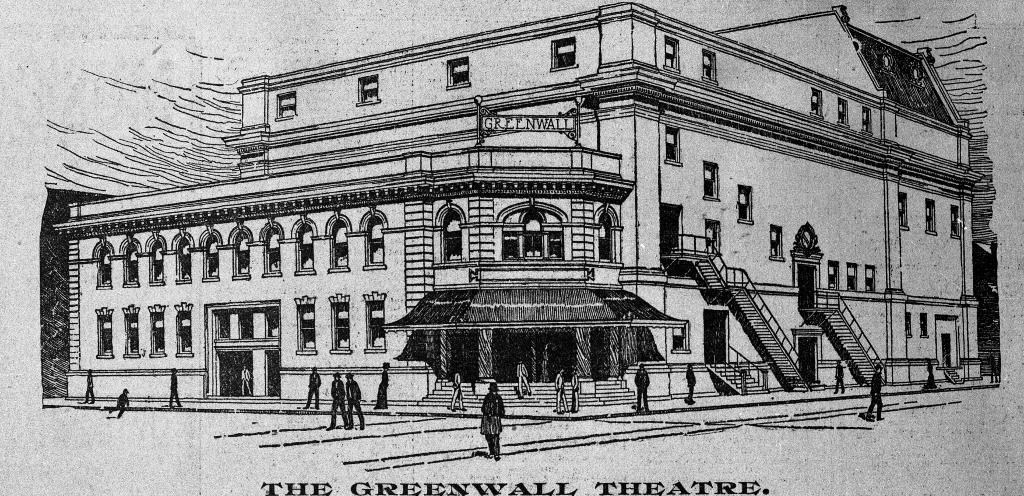
Greenwall Theatre in New Orleans, 1903

Bijou is the French word for jewel and was used for theaters in various cities including New York, Chicago, and Knoxville.

In 1927, the company’s letterhead touted "Celebrating the Biggest and Best Colored Theatres in the South". It included the Bijou Theatre and Lincoln Theatre in Nashville as well as the Royal Theatre under construction there, and the Lenox Theatre in Augusta Georgia, the Lincoln Theatre in Charleston, South Carolina, the Royal Theatre in Columbia, South Carolina, and the Lincoln Theatre in New Bern, North Carolina.

It acquired the Savoy and Lincoln theaters in Charlotte, North Carolina's Brooklyn neighborhood.

Marion A. Brooks organized a show at one of its theaters in Alabama.

Alfred Starr was involved with the company.

The company filed a lawsuit for relief from dramatically increased fees imposed on theaters by the police commissioners in Woonsocket, Rhode Island.

In 1919 it placed an add with Howard-Wells Amusement Company listing their theaters in Wilmington. A page from one of its ledgers is extant.

Roy E. Fox managed its Dixie Theater in Macon, Georgia.

The company's theaters were in cities including San Antonio, Texas; Macon, Georgia; and Raleigh, North Carolina.

With World War II, Starr moved to Washington D.C. and served on the War Industries Board and Office of War Information.

== Theaters ==
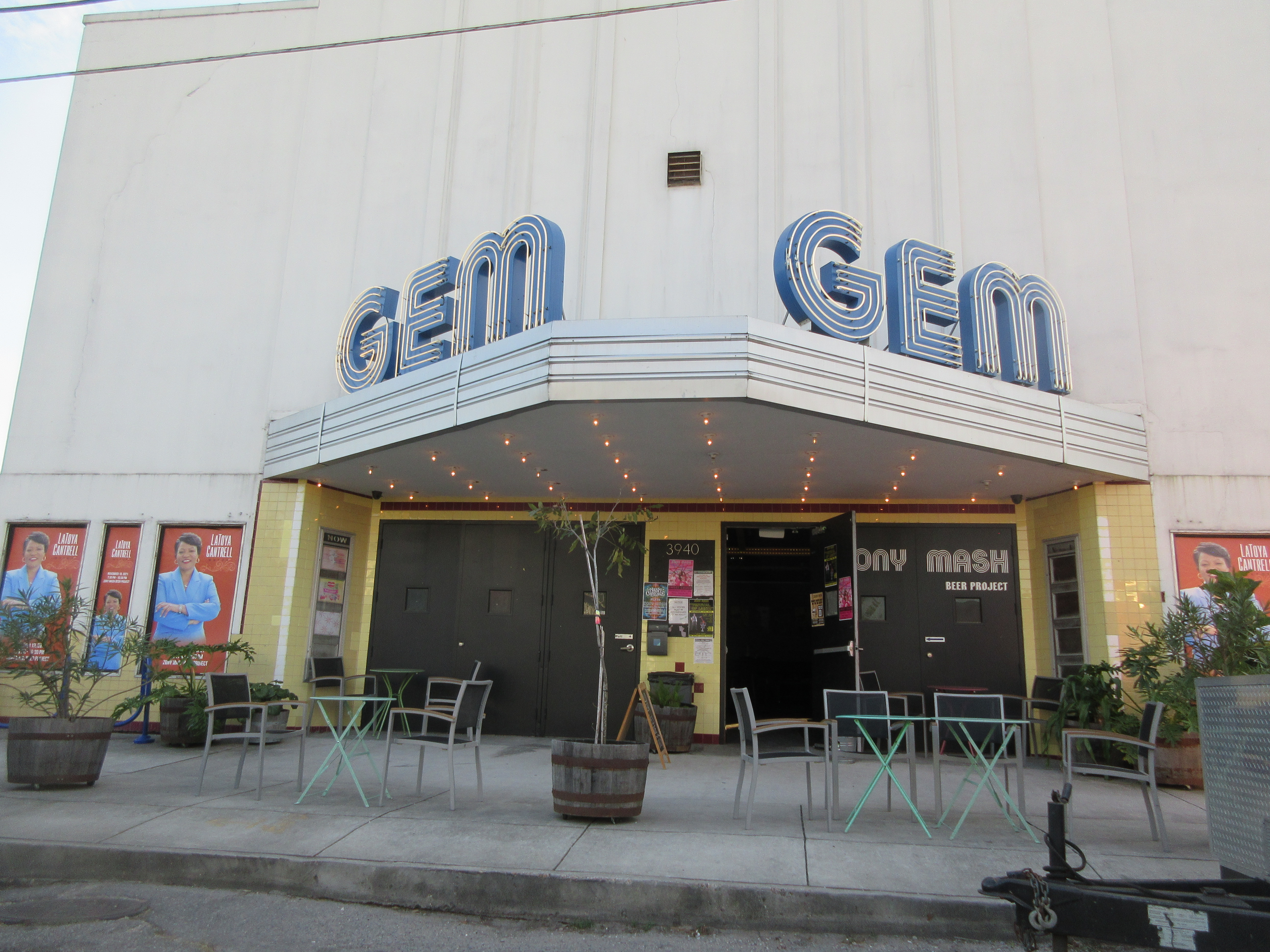
Gem Theater in New Orleans, 2021

- Bijou Theater at 423 4th Avenue North in Nashville on the site of the former Adelphi/Grand Opera House. The Bijou Company's flagship theater it hosted live performance and films. Razed in 1957 for construction of the Municipal Auditorium
- Gem Theater in New Orleans. Operated from 1951 to 1960. Now a microbrewerey listed on the National Register of Historic Places.
- Lincoln Theatre in Charleston, South Carolina. Operated from 1919 to 1971. Demolished after sustaining damage from Hurricane Hugo.
- Lincoln Theater in Raleigh, North Carolina built 1939.
- Savoy Theatre (formerly the Royal) in Charlotte, North Carolina's Brooklyn neighborhood
- Lincoln Theatre, also in Charlotte's Brooklyn neighborhood
- Palace Theatre (formerly the Greenwall Theatre) in New Orleans. It was designed by the Stone Brothers. It closed in the 1950s and was torn down to make way for a parking garage.

== See also ==
- Bijou Theatre, Manhattan
- Bijou Theatre, Knoxville
