= Leon C. Weiss =

American architect

Leon Charles Weiss
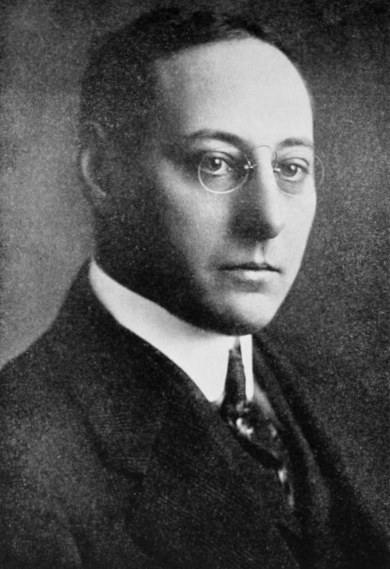
- Born: December 10, 1882; Farmerville, Louisiana US
- Died: April 1, 1953 (aged 70); New Orleans, Louisiana US
- Education: Tulane University
- Occupation: Architect
- Practice: Weiss, Dreyfous & Seiferth
- Buildings: Charity Hospital of New Orleans; Louisiana State Capital; Pontchartrain Hotel
- Projects: Campus of Louisiana State University; Louisiana Tech University

Leon Charles Weiss (December 10, 1882–April 1, 1953) was an architect in the 20th century who designed various public buildings in Louisiana and Mississippi, especially during the 1930s. Many of Weiss's notable designs were commissioned by populist politician Huey Long and financed by the Public Works Administration. Although he designed in various architectural styles, many of his projects are considered to be PWA Moderne.

Weiss's architectural career was interrupted for several years with a 1940 criminal conviction of fraud.

== Early life and education ==
Weiss was born in Farmerville, Louisiana, on December 10, 1882. His father, Theodore Weiss, was an immigrant from the Alsace region of Europe, while his mother, Lena Weiss (née Silverstein), was from New Orleans.

Weiss was educated in the New Orleans public schools, and he subsequently earned a bachelor's degree in engineering technology in 1903 at Tulane University. He remained as an instructor at Tulane, while completing a master's degree there in 1905.

== Architectural career ==
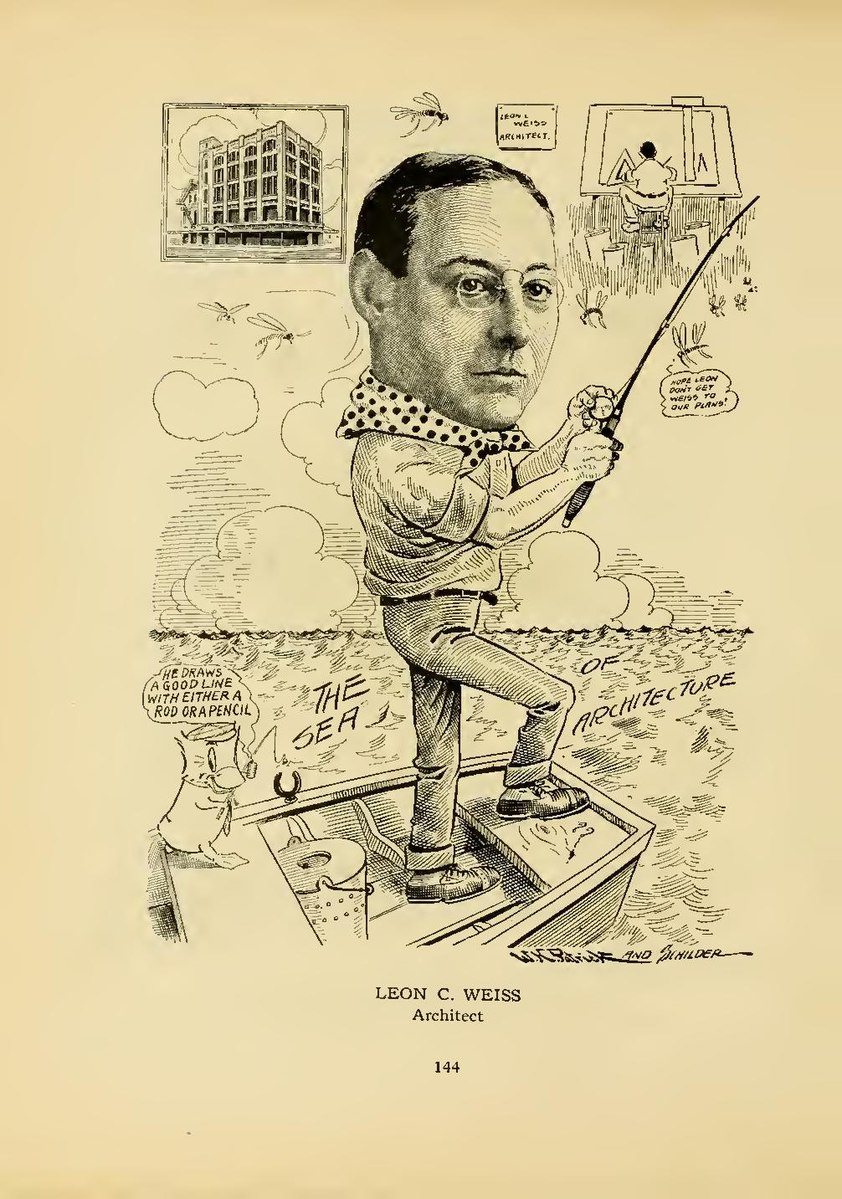
Caricature of Weiss (published in 1917)

Following completion of his master's degree, Weiss began an architectural practice with Keenan & Weiss until 1912, partnering with Walter Cook Keenan. After that, Weiss was in solo architectural practice. As of 1914, Weiss's architectural office was located in Suite 621 in the historic Maison Blanche Building in New Orleans. Later, his office was located at 611 Common Street in New Orleans.

Weiss's architectural career was briefly interrupted for military service from 1918 until 1919, during which he was a captain in the United States Army Quartermasters Corps.

Weiss was a member of the American Institute of Architects. He has been referred to as "Huey's architect". In April 1935, Weiss was awarded an honorary doctorate at Louisiana State University.

=== Weiss, Dreyfous and Seiferth ===
Weiss formed a partnership with architect Felix Julius Dreyfous in 1920. Solis Seiferth became a partner in the same firm in 1923, resulting in the formation of the architectural firm of Weiss, Dreyfous and Seiferth. The firm continued until 1939, when Weiss was indicted and convicted of helping Louisiana State University president Dr. James Monroe Smith embezzle more than $5000 from public funds. The firm then reorganized and continued operation without Weiss's involvement designing buildings such as the Gem Theater.

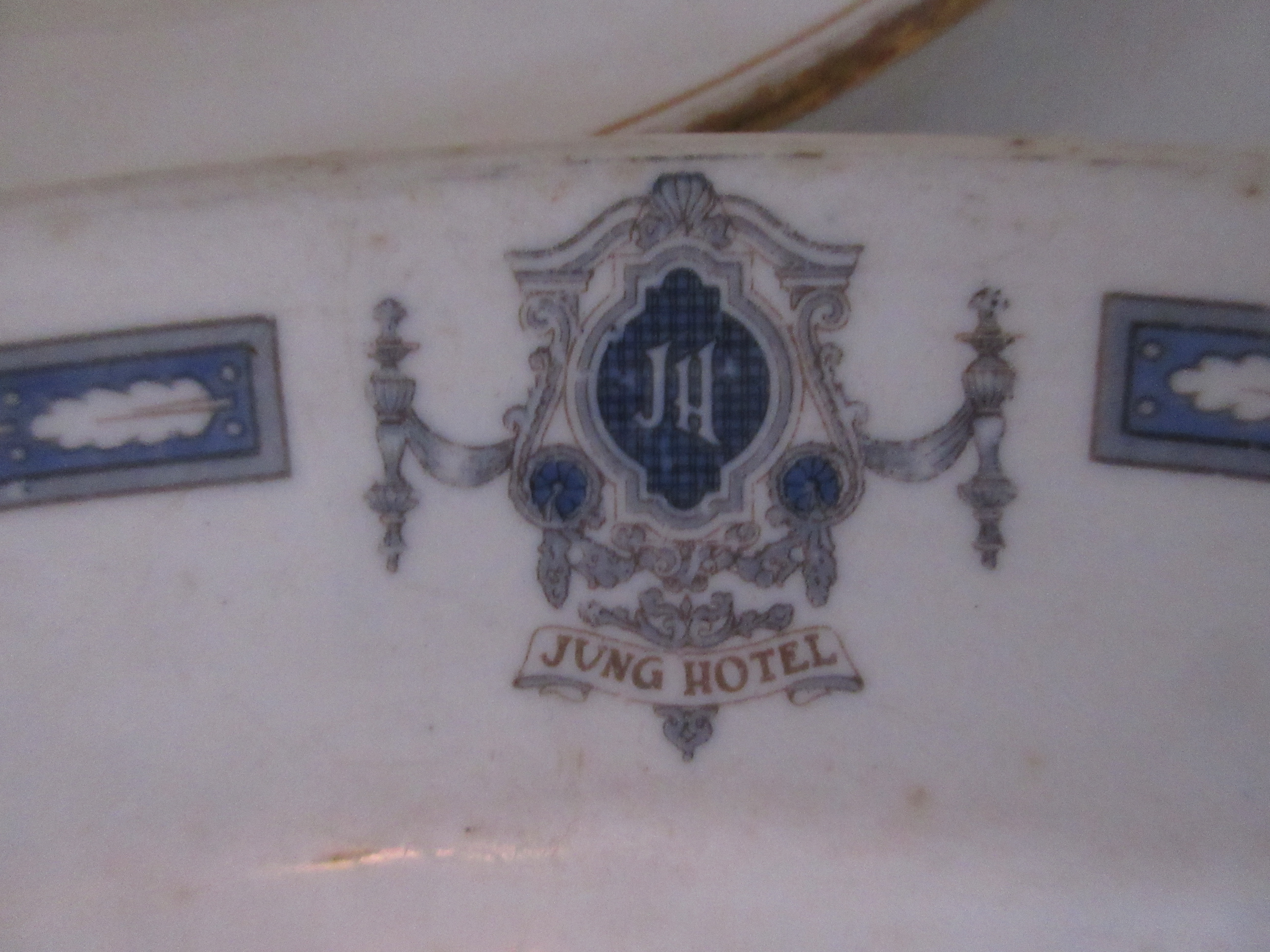
Ceramic faceplate of the Jung Hotel in New Orleans

Weiss's designs, and those of his firm, were of various styles. These included Spanish Colonial Revival and Bauhaus Modern. However, their modern designs were generally more muted than what were common among European modern designs of the time. Because many of their projects were financed by the Public Works Administration, the designs show elements of Beaux Arts classicism and Art Deco, in what is often referred to as PWA Moderne.

Early designs of Weiss, Dreyfous and Seiferth included the Jung Hotel, the Pontchartrain Hotel, and the Granada Theater, all in New Orleans. They also completed several designs in Mississippi in this early time period including the Eola Hotel in Natchez, Mississippi. As his endeavors expanded, Weiss and his various architectural firms also designed many residential homes, in addition to public buildings, academic buildings for colleges, hotels, and other commercial properties. The firms also designed renovations and alterations for existing buildings.

After Huey Long became governor of Louisiana in 1928, Weiss, Dreyfous and Seiferth were awarded many architectural design contracts for public buildings in Louisiana. This connection came about as Weiss had met Long in 1928 and subsequently his firm supported Long as he went through impeachment proceedings in 1929. Long had a vision of modernizing Louisiana, which included extensive building projects. Long needed suitable architecture for this purpose.

=== State government office buildings ===
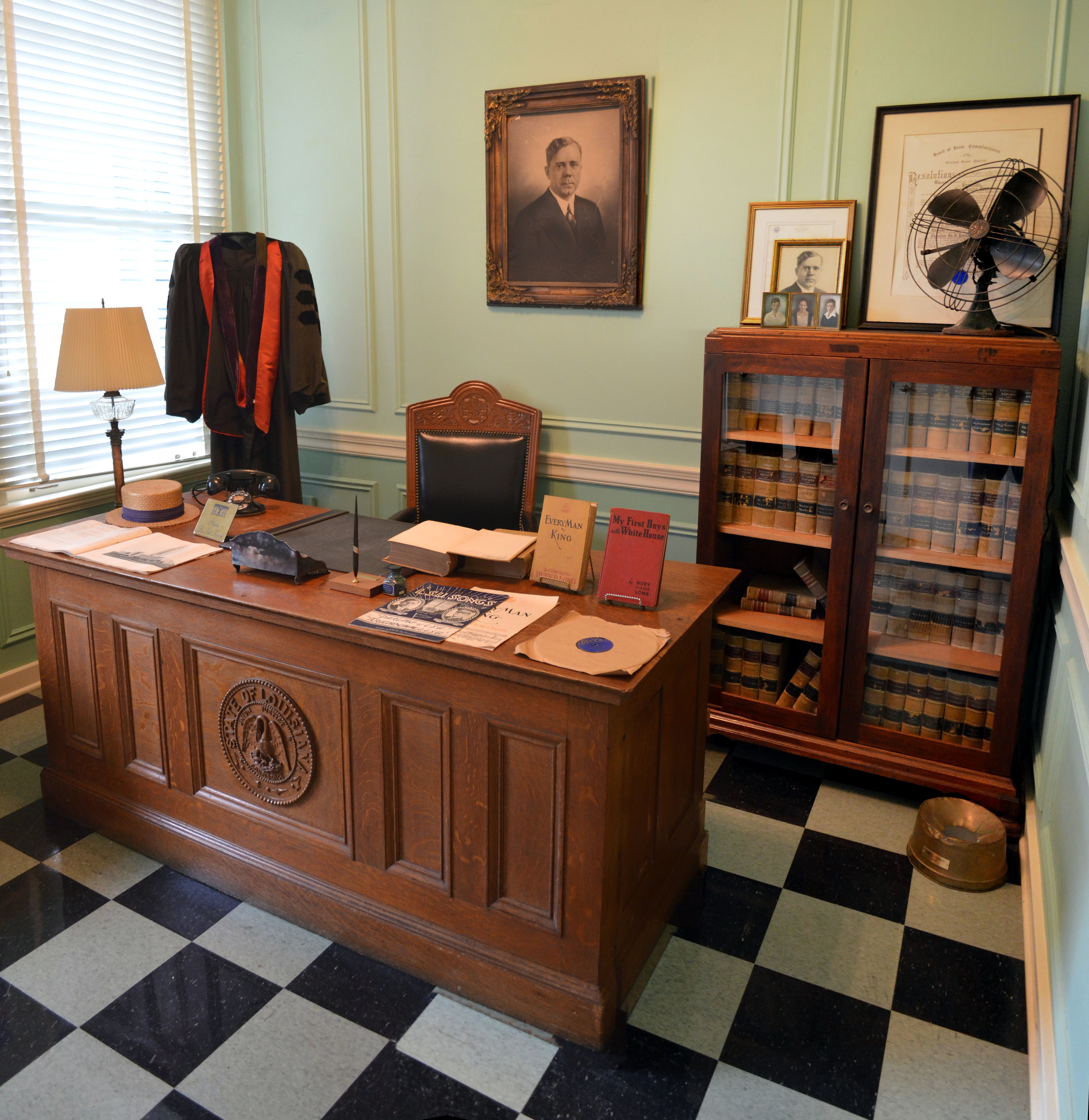
Huey Long's office at the old Louisiana Governor's Mansion

In 1930, then Governor Huey Long commissioned Weiss and his architectural firm to design a new state capitol building for Louisiana. While not specifying the design, Long desired a skyscraper with suitable artwork to depict the history of Louisiana. The new capitol building opened in 1932 at a cost of $5 million, in an art deco design. The building is 430 feet tall with 34 storeys and was then the tallest building in the southern United States. The building, though monumental, is somewhat inefficient in that the floor space of individual storeys is in many cases too small to accommodate a state agency, necessitating that various agencies be spread out in the capitol building. However, it centralized executive agencies in one location for efficiency gain. The building includes statues, frescoes, bronzes, and other artworks with historic symbolism. Symbolically, the building shows dominance of the executive branch of the Louisiana State Government over the other branches. The Louisiana State Capitol building has some resemblance to the Nebraska State Capitol building which was completed a few years before, in 1930, and is slightly smaller.

Consistent with Long's desire to modernize Louisiana, he chose to replace the governor's mansion, which was in an old southern style, with a more up to date building. Weiss and his architectural firm received the design commission. The design of the governor's mansion is similar to the United States White House, with the first floors of the two buildings identical. Weiss designed in features specifically to Long's liking including an escape from public parts of the building to the governor's private quarters and the garage, as well as an electronic display for following votes in the Louisiana State Legislature. The building served as the governor's mansion from 1930 to 1963 and is currently on the National Register of Historic Places.

Long and Weiss created a time capsule of unknown contents within the walls of the Louisiana State Capitol building. The time capsule consists of a copper box and was removed from the walls of the building in 2020 and placed on display, with intent to open it in 2031, which is 100 years after its original placement.

=== College campuses ===
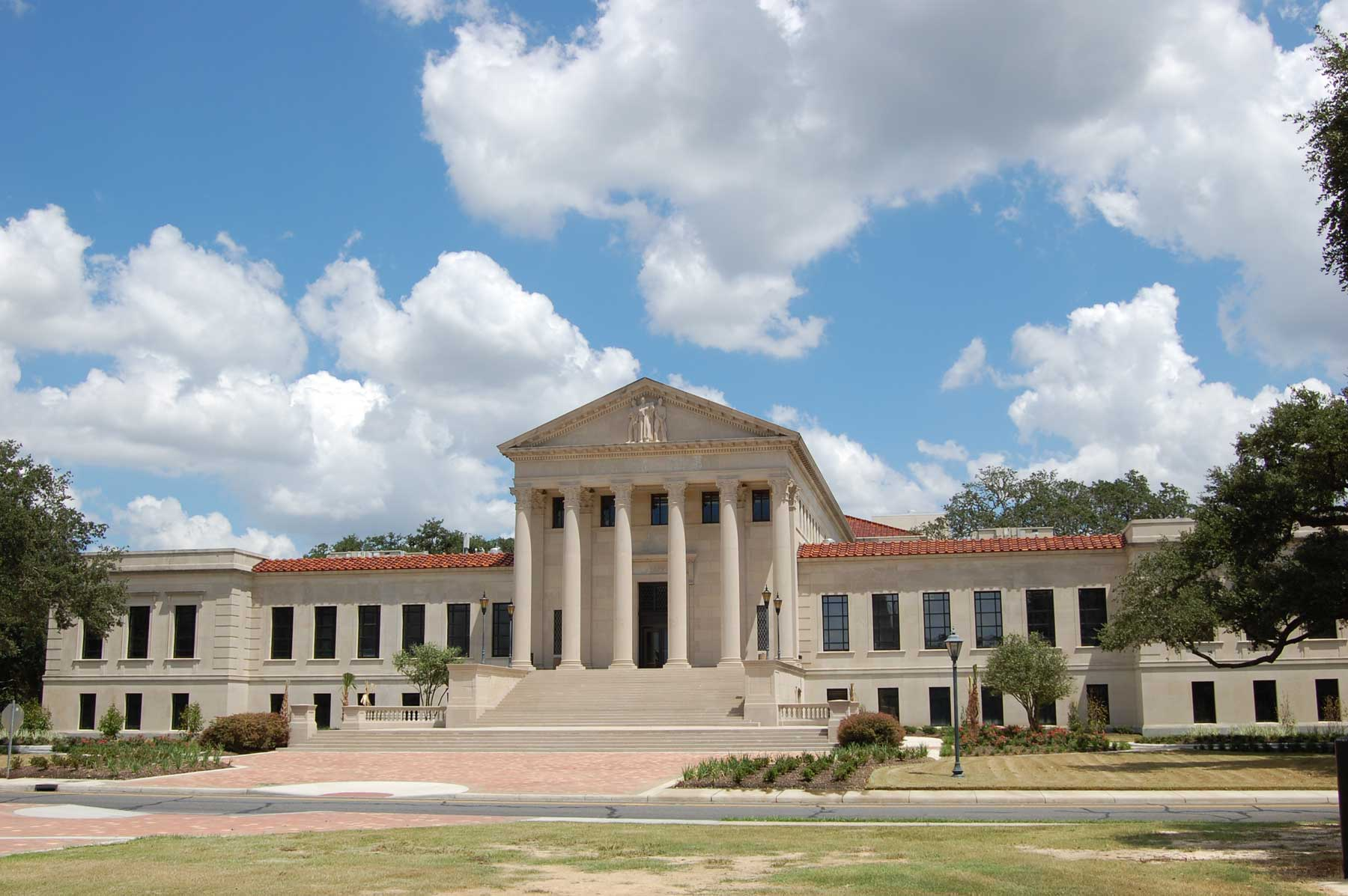
Old Law School Building on the campus of Louisiana State University

Huey Long was committed to expanding the state university system in Louisiana, beyond the original design of architect Theodore C. Link. As Weiss, Dreyfous and Seiferth's relationship with the Long political machine solidified, the firm received many design contracts for colleges and universities in Louisiana during the 1930s. The main campus of Louisiana State University in Baton Rouge went through significant expansion with funding supplemented by the Public Works Administration. Weiss's firm designed various academic buildings, dormitories, and athletic facilities for the campus.

The Louisiana State Legislature was opposed to building a new football stadium. Instead, at Long's request, Weiss designed student dormitories into the design of the stadium, since dormitories were an approved expense by the state legislature. Additionally, Long wanted the swimming pool at the university's Huey P. Long Field House to be the largest swimming pool in the United States. To that end, Weiss's design for the facility included a swimming pool that was one foot longer than the next longest swimming pool in the United States at the time.

Regional college campus went through significant development during this time period, with Weiss, Dreyfous and Seiferth similarly involved. These included various buildings at Southeastern Louisiana University in Hammond, McNeese State University in Lake Charles, and the University of Louisiana at Lafayette.

From Huey Long's persistence, the state of Louisiana built a new medical school, which was in New Orleans, as the Louisiana State University Medical School. The medical school was designed by Weiss and his firm. Its proximity with the already-established Tulane University School of Medicine created a competitive situation between the two institutions.

Designs for the college campus buildings included Colonial Revival, PWA Moderne, and Streamline Moderne. The design for the Louisiana State University Law School was reminiscent of the United States Supreme Court Building.

=== Charity Hospital ===
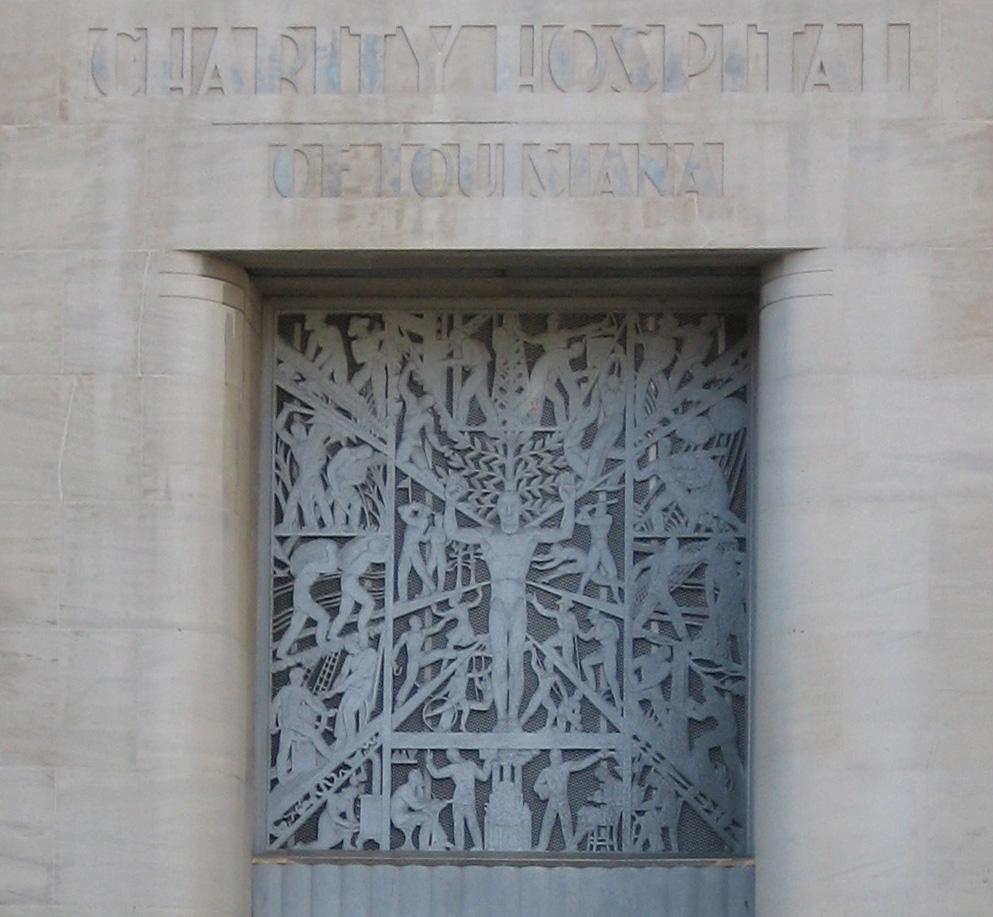
Aluminum grill in the transom of the main entrance of the hospital, by Enrique Alférez

By 1933, New Orleans Charity Hospital was in need of a new building to replace the dilapidated one that was in use at the time. After considerable discussion by the Louisiana state government led by Huey Long and the Public Works Administration (PWA), Weiss's architectural firm was awarded the design contract for the new building in 1936. On its completion in 1939, the new hospital was the second largest in the United States and, at 20 stories, was the tallest building in New Orleans.

Weiss and his architectural firm was to receive a 6% fee for their design. However, the original cost estimate of $8 million rose to $12.5 million. The PWA declined to pay a larger fee based on the higher cost, taking the position that all the architectural work was done before construction costs increased. The state government of Louisiana made up the difference.

The height of the new hospital building was a significant design achievement because of the soft alluvial ground in the New Orleans area. Shortly after completion of construction, the new building began sinking, eventually by 18 inches (46 centimeters). This subsidence resulted in distortions, cracks, and separations in the walls of the building. Consulting engineers were hired to assess the problem, of which Weiss's firm paid a portion of the cost.

Weiss integrated various artworks in the design for the hospital. This included an aluminum sculpture by Enrique Alférez, located in the transom of the main entrance to the hospital. The aluminum sculpture included a flying duck, just to the right of the central human figure of the sculpture. This was a reference to the practice of Huey Long of "deduct boxes" in which state employees were expected to make personal contributions to Long's political efforts. In the vernacular of the state employees, "de ducks were flying".

The sculptor Alférez later alleged that Weiss frequently asked for more money to pay political debts of then Governor Richard W. Leche, who was part of the Huey Long political machine. He also contended that Weiss inappropriately compromised in implementation of the hospital design for the purposes of obtaining money to pay political debts. None of the allegations were confirmed in subsequent investigations by authorities.

== Scandal ==
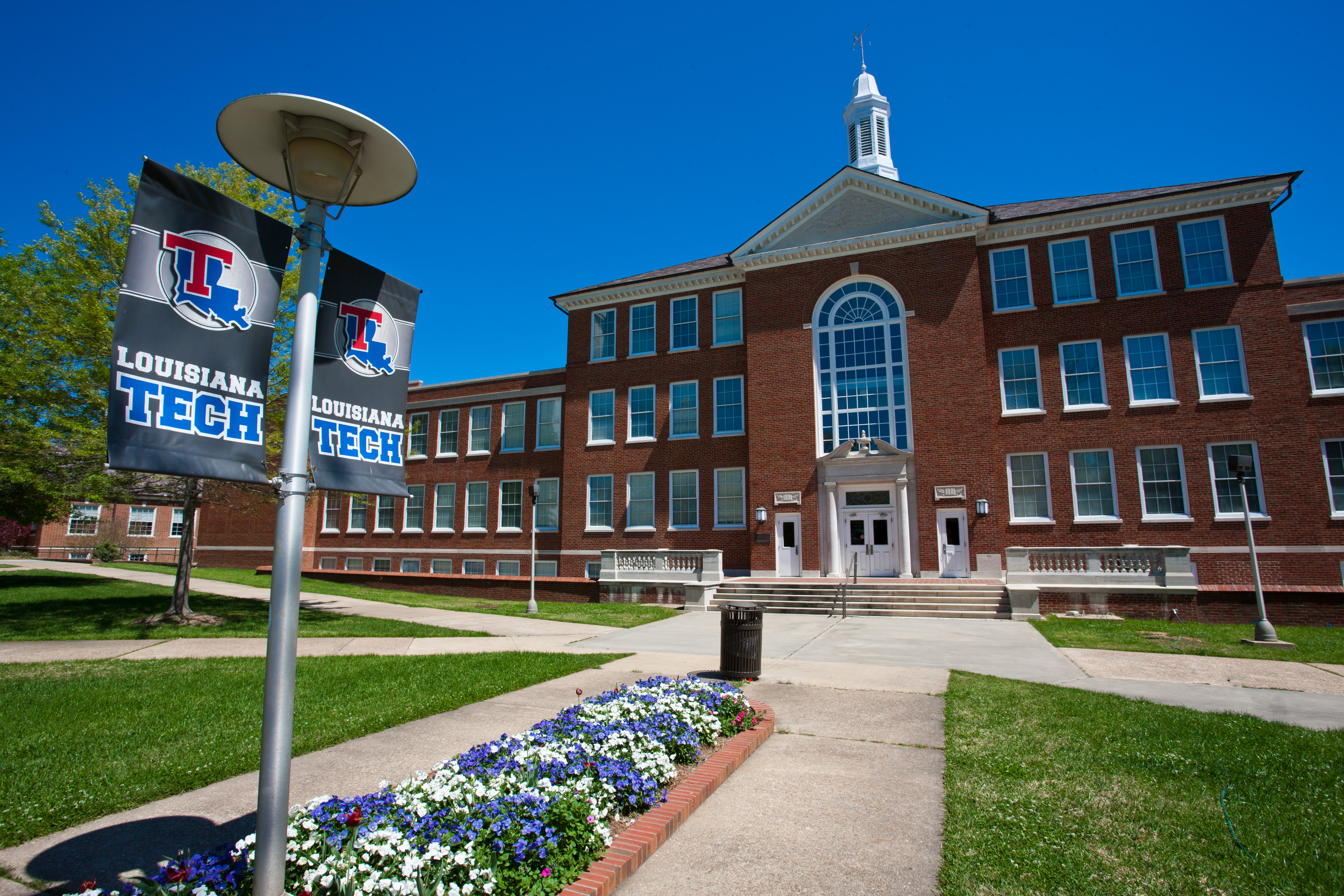
Keeny Hall at Louisiana Tech University, designed by Weiss

In 1939, a grand jury in East Baton Rouge Parish, Louisiana, indicted Weiss on charges of aiding and abetting embezzlement by the former president of Louisiana State University. The fraudulent payment to Weiss's firm was for $27,000. The defendants in the case were Weiss, his architectural partners Dreyfous and Seiferth, then former Louisiana governor Richard W. Leche, and Monte E. Hart, who was a contractor in the building project at Louisiana Tech University. Weiss was subsequently convicted of federal mail fraud charges and sentenced to serve at the United States Penitentiary, Atlanta. He was imprisoned from 1942 to 1944, serving 2 years of the 5-year sentence. The incident was part of the "Louisiana Hayride Scandals".

Following his release from prison, Weiss formed an architectural practice with Edward B. Silverstein in New Orleans. Weiss's most significant design after returning to architectural practice was an expansion of the Jung Hotel in the early 1950s.

== Personal life ==
On December 30, 1908, Weiss married Berta Evelyn Hirsh of Vicksburg, Mississippi. They had a son Theodore Joseph Weiss, born on November 29, 1909. Berta and Theodore died on July 9, 1915. Weiss married Caroline Helen Dreyfous (1898-1995) of New Orleans on September 29, 1927. The couple had a son and two daughters. Caroline Dreyfous was the sister of Weiss's partner in architectural practice. One of the daughters of his second marriage is Leta Caroline Weiss Marks, who became a faculty member of the University of Hartford and wrote a book about her parents. The other daughter was Elizabeth Jane Weiss Parnes (1928-2008). His son was Leon Charles Weiss Jr. (1934-2009).

Weiss designed his own home, which was located at 7425 Dominican Street in New Orleans. The home remained in the Weiss family until 1997. For many years, Weiss and his family also maintained a vacation home on the north shore of Lake Pontchartrain along the Tchefuncte River, the home being called "Kiskatom".

Leon C. Weiss was unrelated to Huey Long's assassin Carl Weiss and unrelated to Huey Long's business partner Seymour Weiss, even though all three have the same family name. Others have noted that the prominence of Jewish people such as Weiss and his architectural partners was somewhat unusual in the southern United States at the time.

Weiss died of heart disease on April 1, 1953. He is buried at Metairie Cemetery in New Orleans with the Latin phrase "ad astra per aspera", meaning "through hardship to the stars", etched on his tombstone.

== Gallery ==
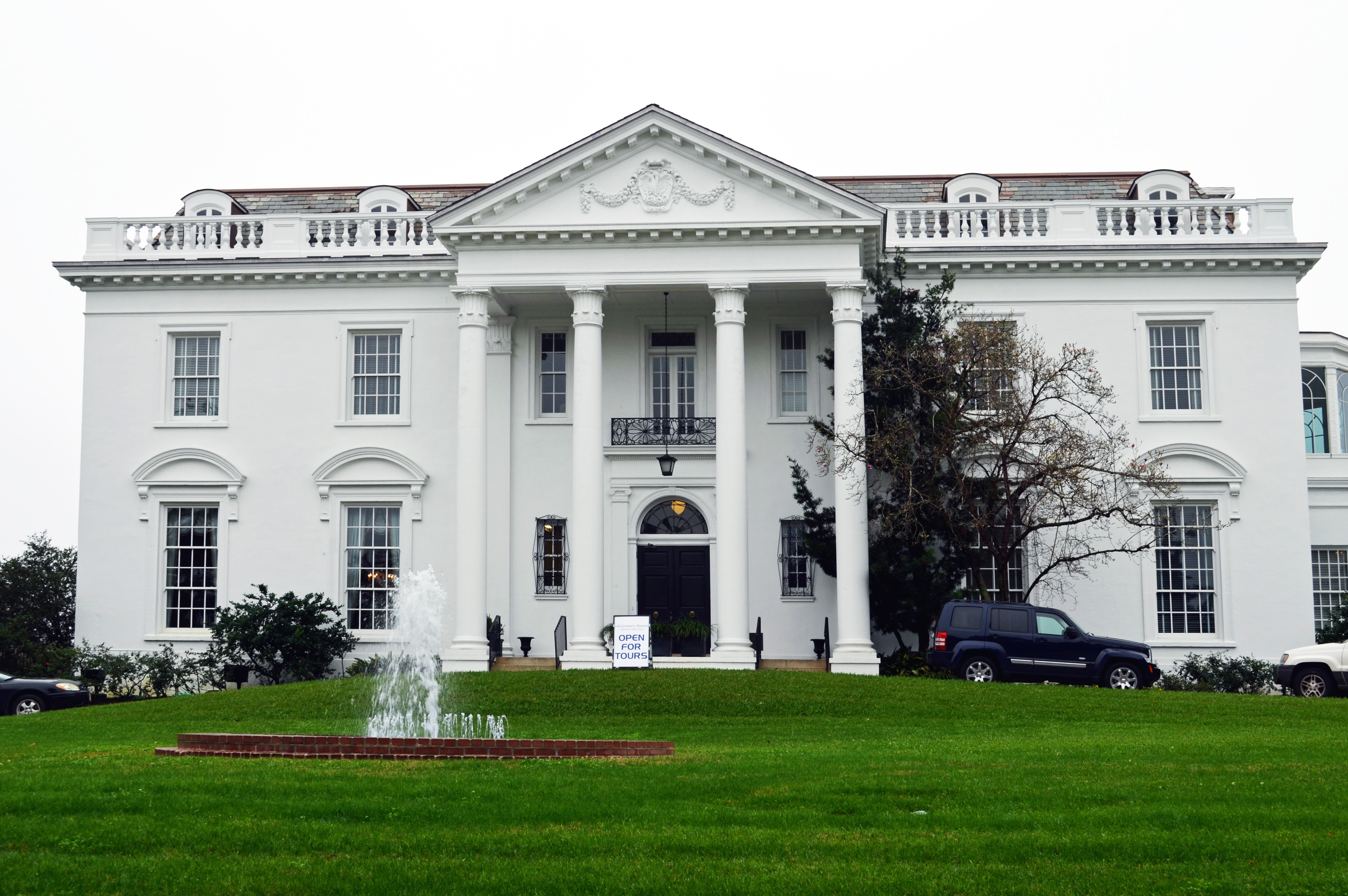
Louisiana Governor's Mansion, as designed by Weiss

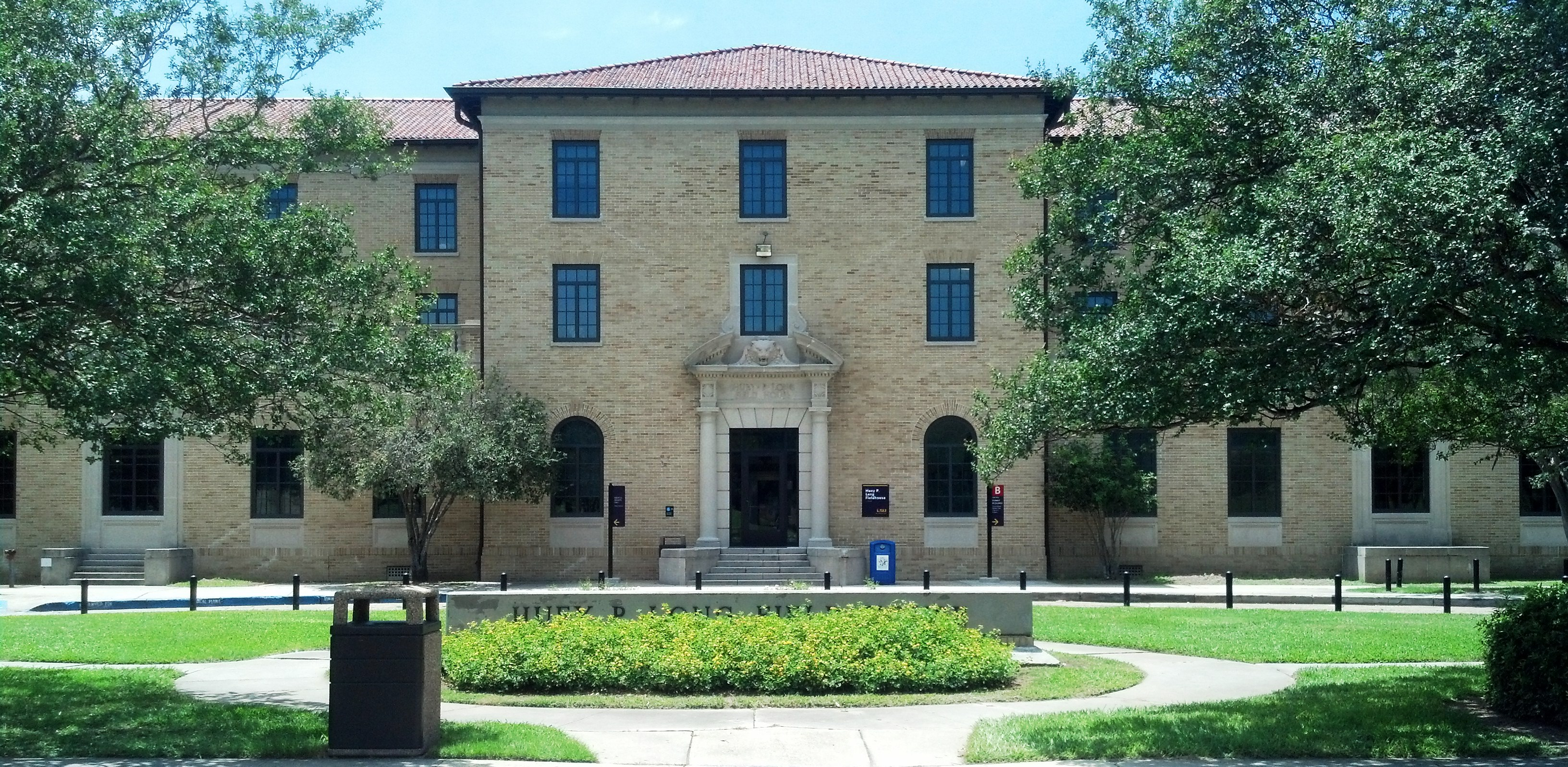
Huey P. Long Field House, on the main campus of Louisiana State University

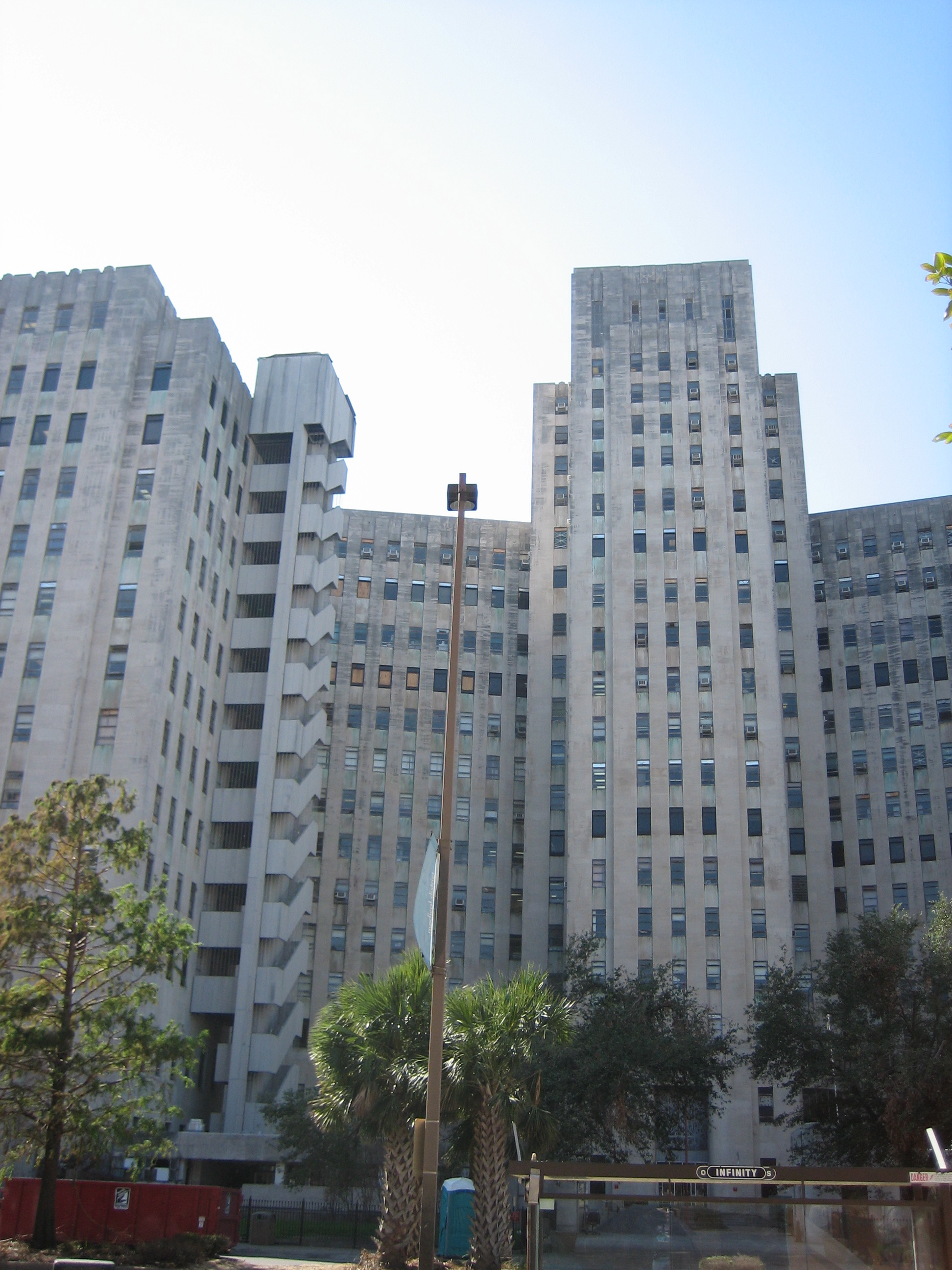
Charity Hospital, as seen in 2005 after Hurricane Katrina

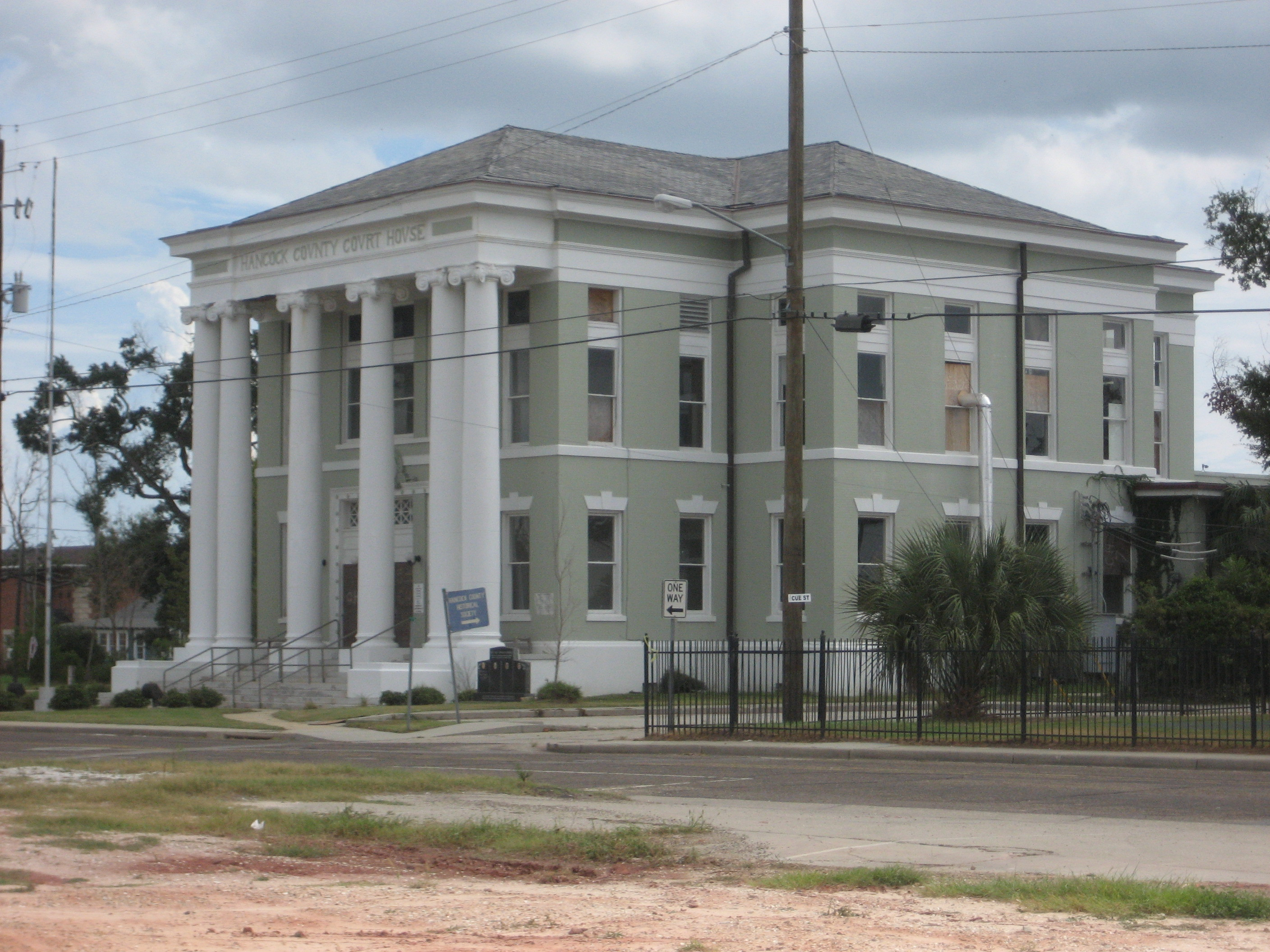
Hancock County Courthouse in Bay St. Louis, Mississippi, as seen in 2007

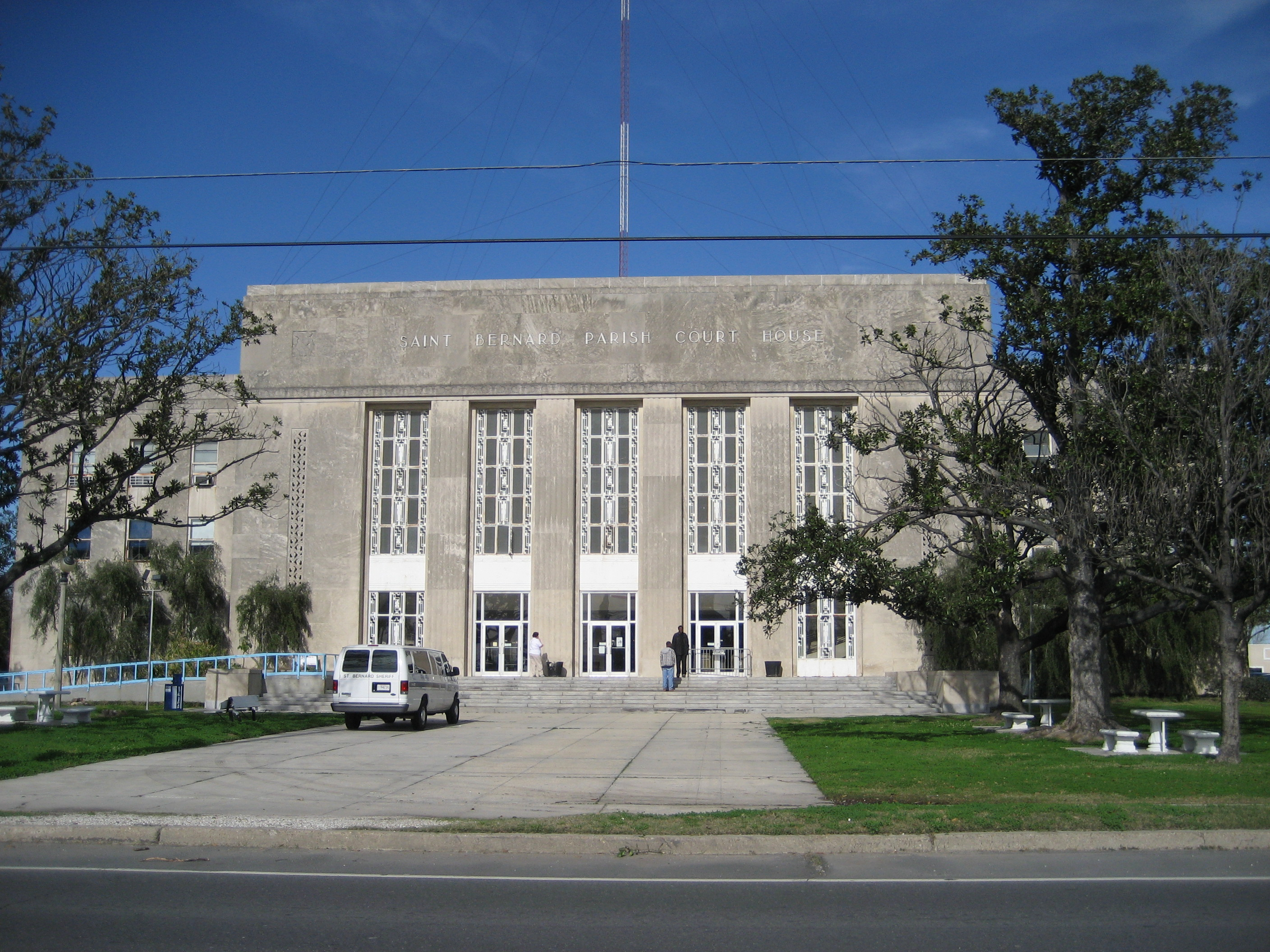
St. Bernard Parish Courthouse as seen in 2007

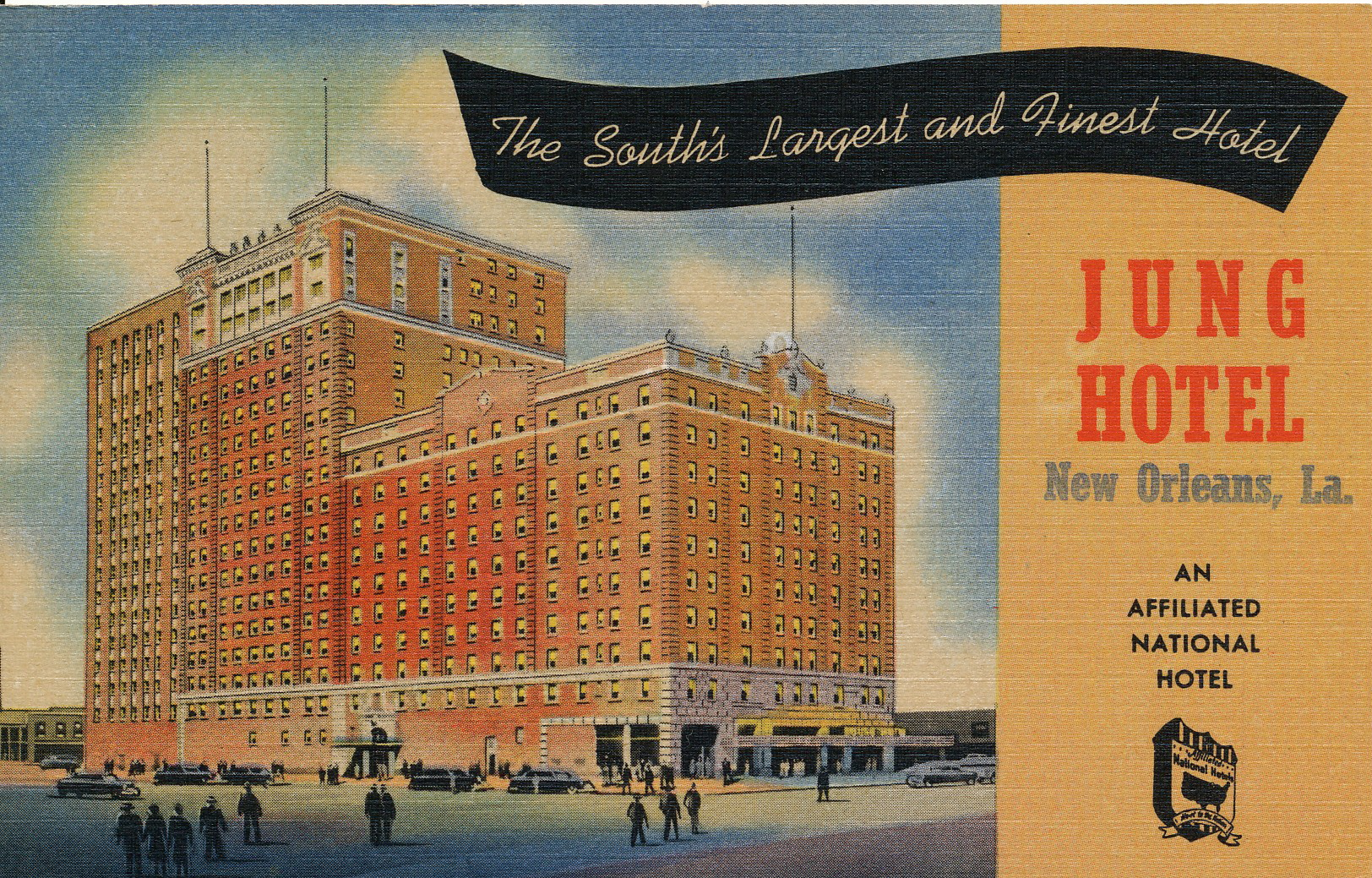
Postcard of the Jung Hotel in New Orleans, circa 1950

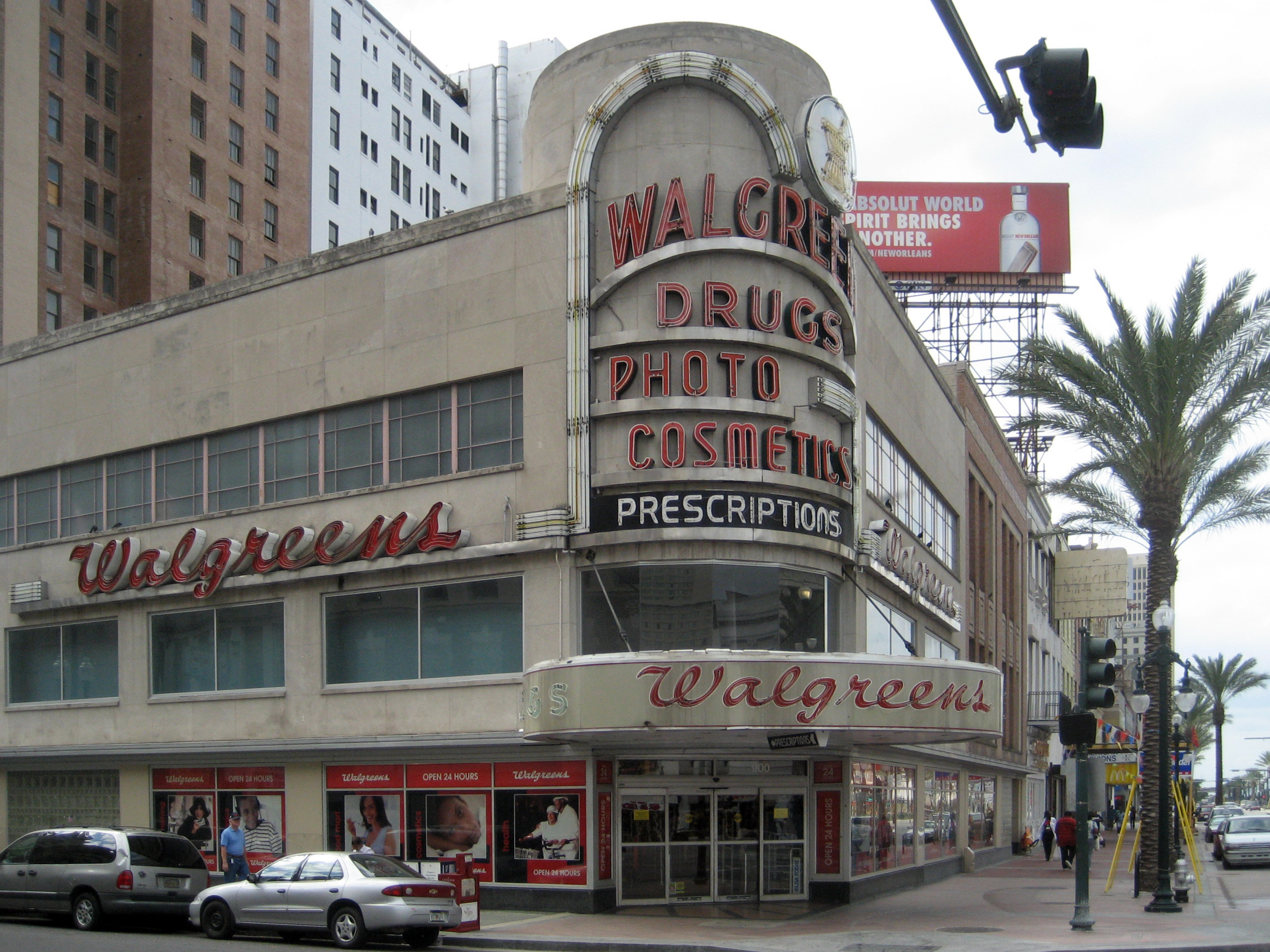
Walgreens Drugstore on Canal Street in New Orleans

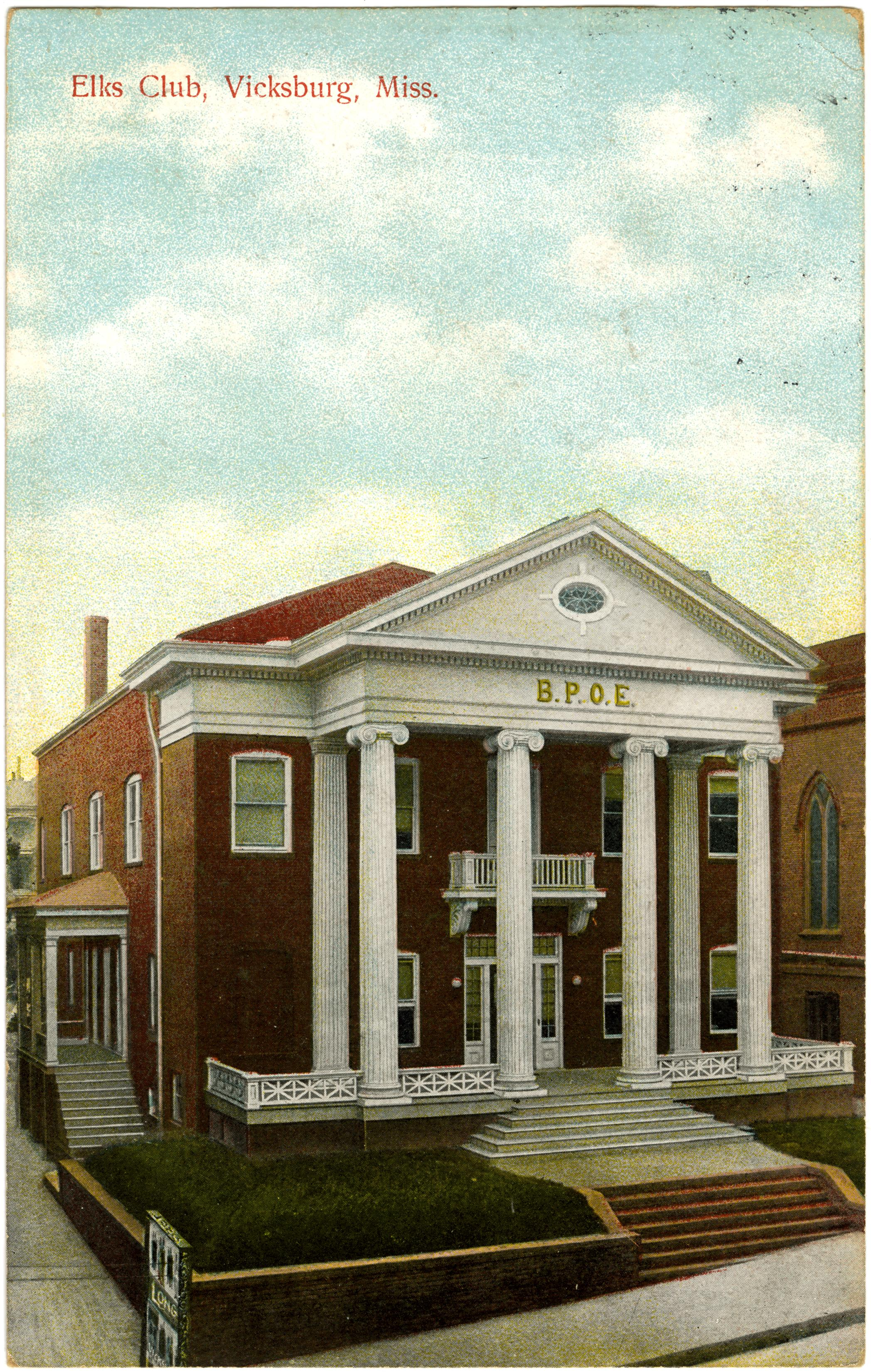
Elks Club in Vicksburg, Mississippi

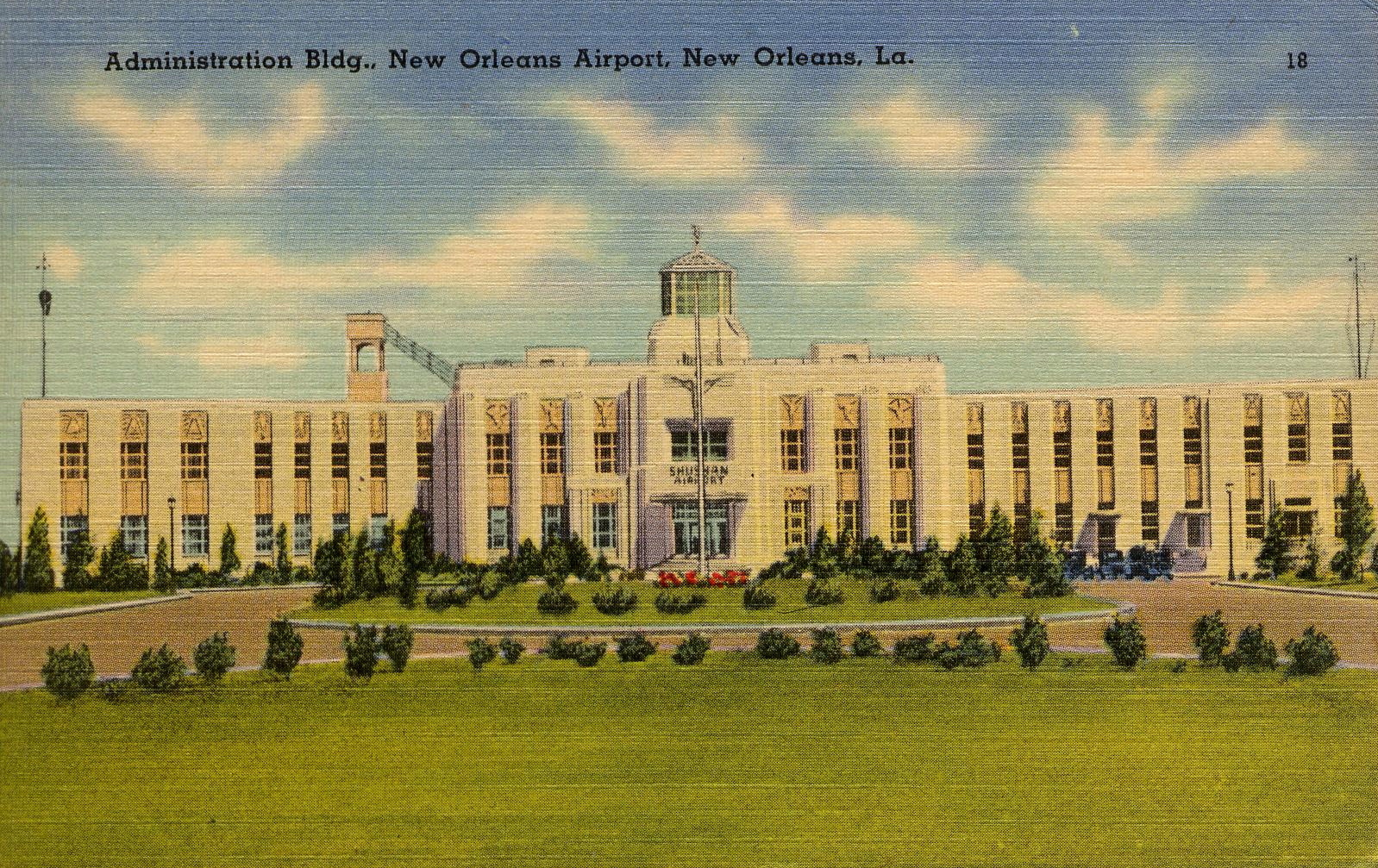
Administration Building at New Orleans Lakefront Airport

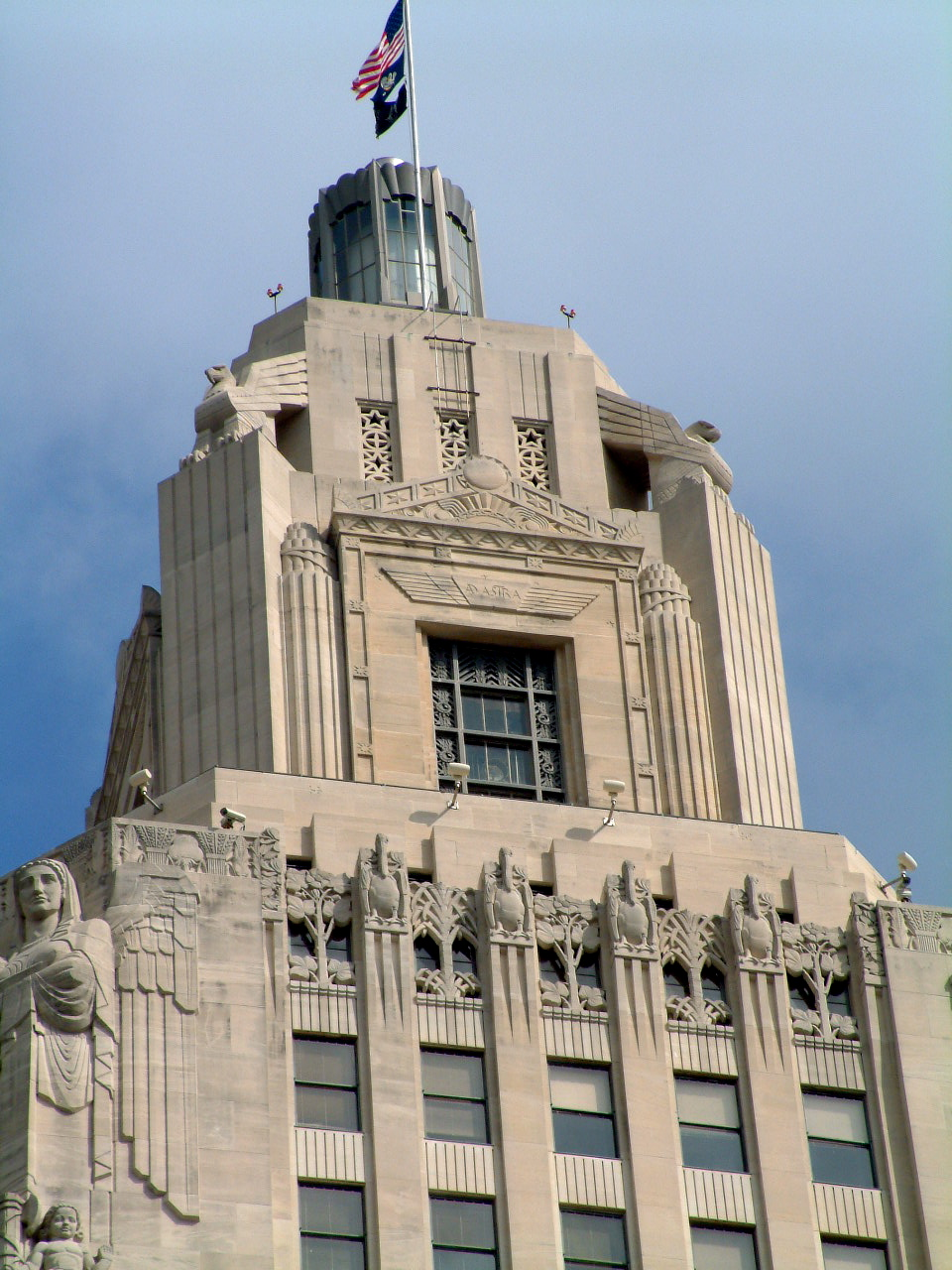
Closeup of the cupola and beacon on the Louisiana State Capitol building

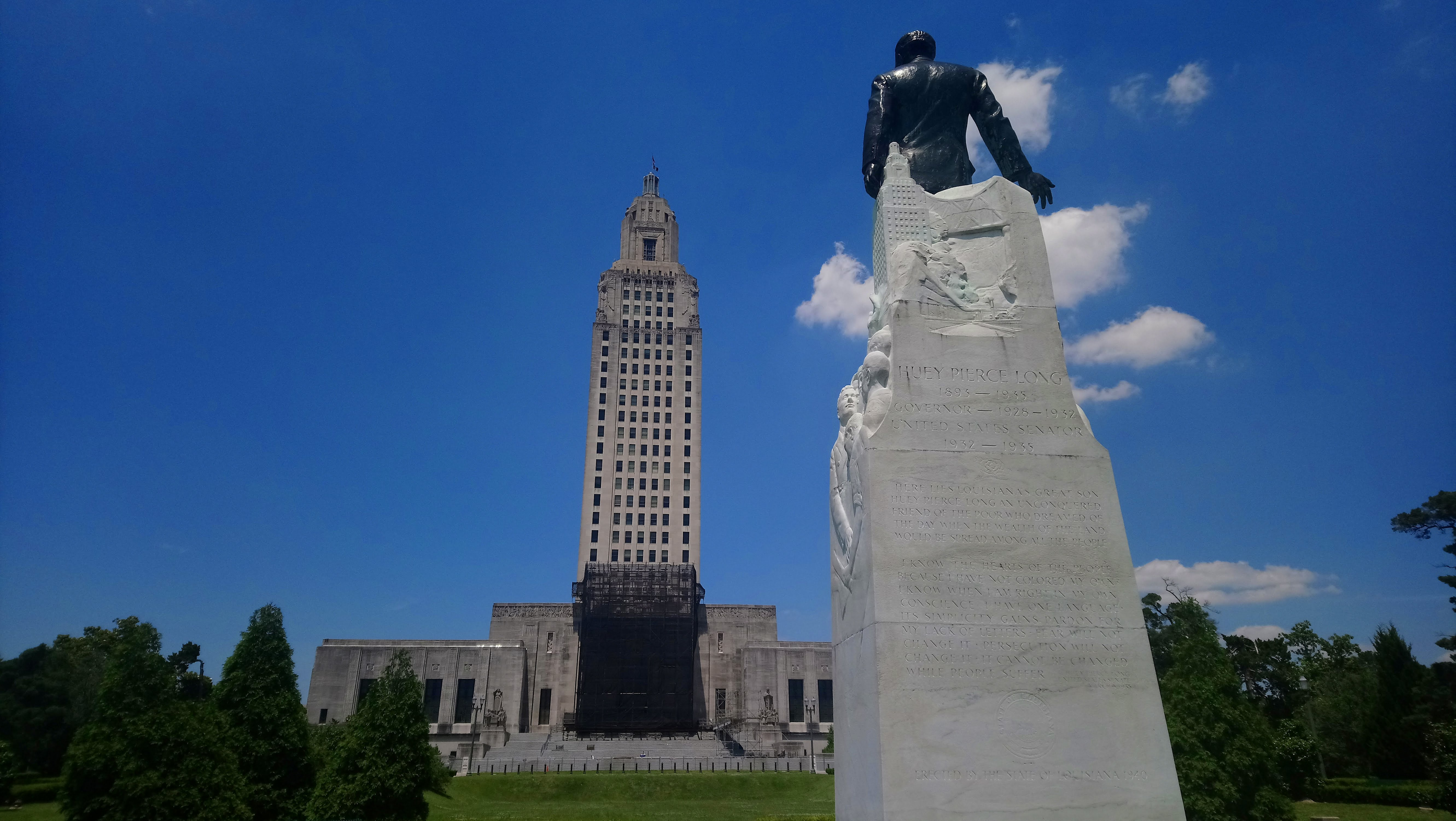
Statue of Huey P. Long in front of the Louisiana State Capitol building
