= Louisiana State Capitol =

Seat of government of the U.S. state of Louisiana

- Interactive map of the Louisiana State Capitol area

General information
- Architectural style: Art Deco
- Location: 900 North 3rd Street; Baton Rouge, Louisiana; United States
- Coordinates: 30°27′25″N 91°11′14″W
- Construction started: December 16, 1930; 95 years ago
- Inaugurated: May 16, 1932; 94 years ago
- Cost: $5 million
- Client: State of Louisiana
- Owner: State of Louisiana

Height
- Height: 450 ft (137 m)

Design and construction
- Architects: Weiss, Dreyfous and Seiferth

U.S. National Register of Historic Places
- Official name: Louisiana State Capitol; Building and Gardens
- Designated: June 9, 1978
- Reference no.: 78001421

U.S. National Historic Landmark
- Designated: December 12, 1982

The Louisiana State Capitol (French: Capitole de l'État de Louisiane) is the seat of government for the U.S. state of Louisiana and is located in downtown Baton Rouge. The capitol houses the chambers for the Louisiana State Legislature, made up of the House of Representatives and the Senate, as well as the office of the Governor of Louisiana. At 450 feet (137 m) tall and with 34 stories, it is the tallest skyscraper in Baton Rouge, the seventh tallest building in Louisiana, and the tallest capitol in the United States. It is located on a 27-acre (110,000 m^{2}) tract, which includes the Capitol Gardens. The Louisiana State Capitol is often thought of as "Huey Long's monument" due to the influence of the former governor and U.S. senator in getting the Capitol built. The building's construction was completed in 1931. It was listed on the National Register of Historic Places in 1978 and was designated a National Historic Landmark in 1982.

== History ==
To secure the mouth of the Mississippi River for the French, the town of New Orleans was founded in 1718 and became the capital of the colony of Louisiana in 1722. In 1763, the Treaty of Paris ceded the portion of Louisiana that was west of the Mississippi River, as well as New Orleans, to Spain and the remaining territory east of the Mississippi was turned over to Great Britain. The French reclaimed Louisiana from the Spanish in 1803 after the Treaty of San Ildefonso in 1800; the territory was then sold as the Louisiana Purchase to the United States. The ceremonial transfers of Louisiana from Spain to France in November 1803 took place in front of the colonial seat of government, the Cabildo. The transfer from France to the U.S. occurred there as well less than a month later.

New Orleans continued to be the location of the capital of the Territory of Orleans, and through its admission into the U.S. as the state of Louisiana. The State Legislature passed a resolution declaring that the seat of government be moved to a "more convenient place" than New Orleans. No action was taken until 1829 when the Legislature voted to move to Donaldsonville. It convened for the first time in Donaldsonville in January 1830. On January 8, 1831, it became "dissatisfied with the quarters there", and adjourned shortly thereafter to return to New Orleans.

=== Old State Capitol ===
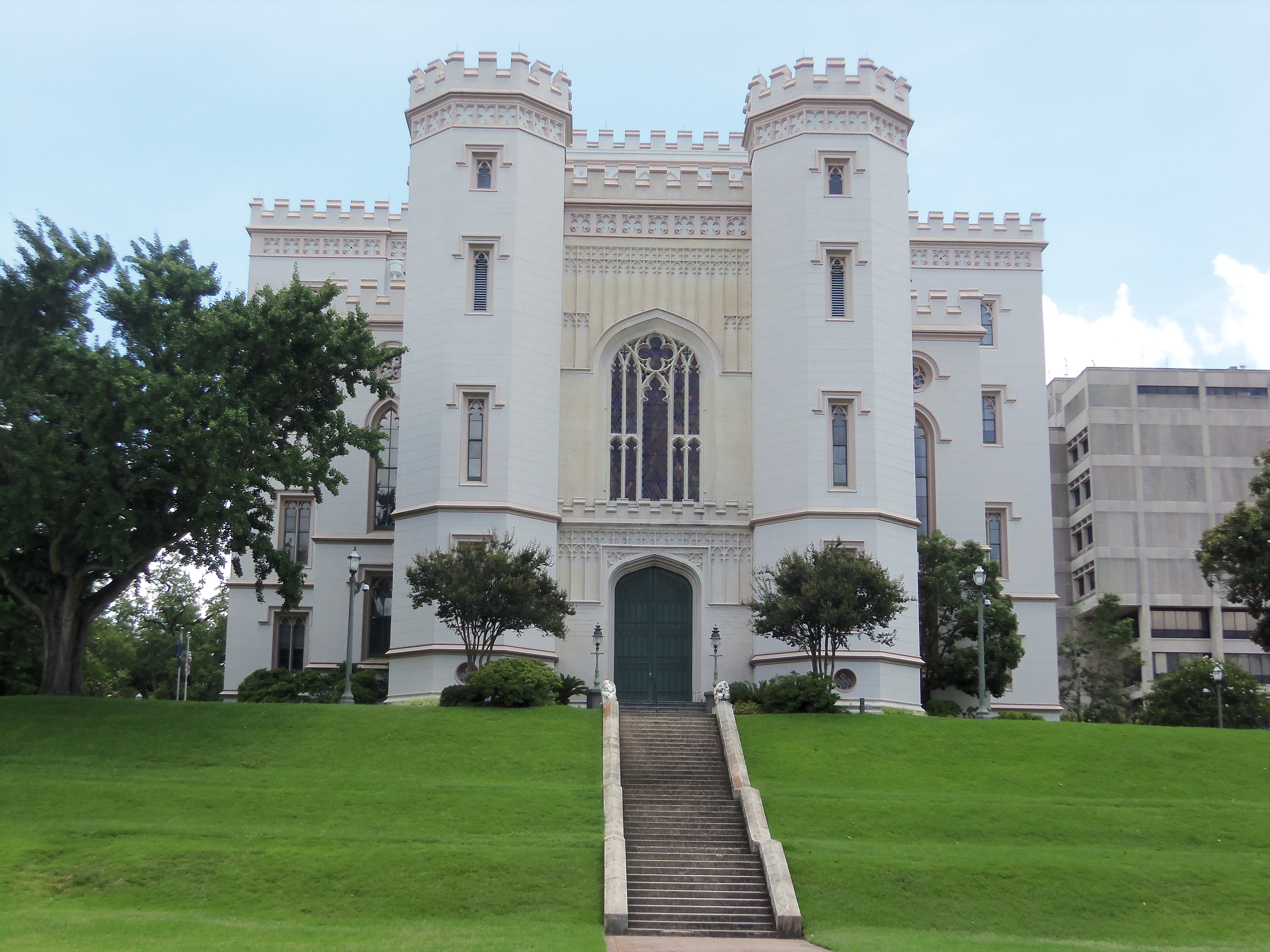
The Old State Capitol (1849–1862, 1882–1932)

Included in the Louisiana State Constitution of 1845 was a clause that required the state capital to be moved from New Orleans by 1849. A committee was formed to prepare a site for the eventual move and, the designs by James H. Dakin were chosen in a competition on May 5, 1847. The city of Baton Rouge donated a plot of land situated on a bluff overlooking the Mississippi River to the state on September 7 for the construction of the new capitol. Dakin's design for the capitol consisted of a "castellated" Gothic Revival building, a rarity for government buildings in the United States. The capitol was dedicated on December 1, 1849 in what was planned to be a grand ceremony. However, a devastating fire in Baton Rouge a week prior saw the funds reallocated as aid for the victims, which was deemed a "more worthy cause". The Old State Capitol is considered the best example of Gothic Revival architecture in the South, although it was notably criticized by Mark Twain, who called it an "architectural falsehood" due to its cod-medieval appearance (which he attributed to the influence of Sir Walter Scott).

With the start of the Civil War in 1861, and the occupation of both New Orleans and Baton Rouge by the Union Army, the location of the state government was moved to Opelousas in 1862, and then to Shreveport in 1864. The portion of Louisiana that was occupied by Union troops was governed out of New Orleans. The vacant Old State Capitol was originally used as a prison by the Union Army and, then, as a garrison for its colored troops. On December 28, 1862, it was gutted by an accidental fire. After the war, the state government returned to New Orleans and utilized a mechanics' institute as a meeting place until the state purchased an old hotel in 1875. The State Legislature appropriated money to rebuild the Old State Capitol in 1880; William A. Freret was placed in charge of the reconstruction. Under Freret, the capitol's famous spiral staircase and stained glass dome were added, as well as a fourth floor. The State Legislature returned to Baton Rouge, after the completion of the renovations, on May 8, 1882.

=== Current State Capitol ===
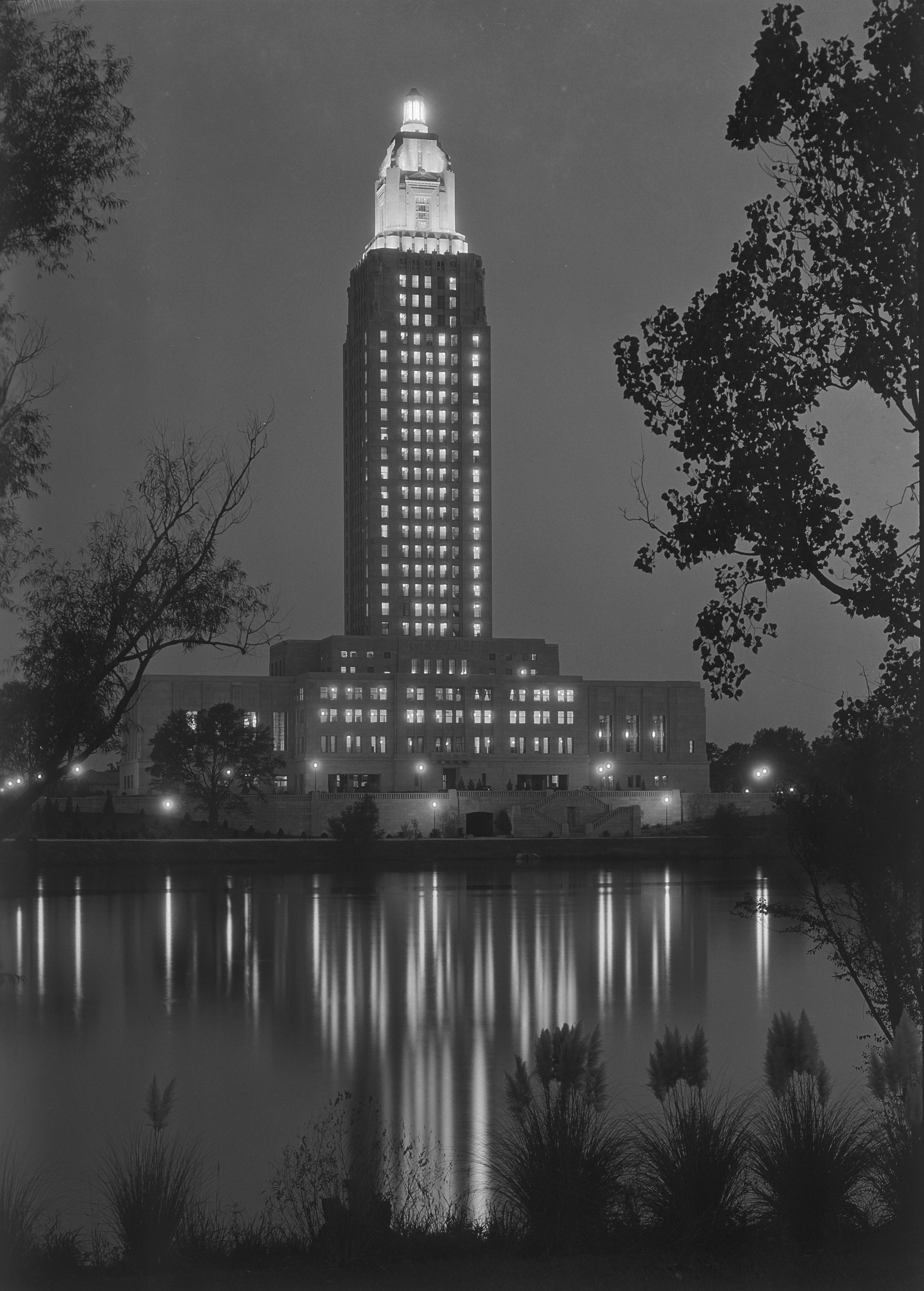
The new capitol lit up at night in 1932

By the 1920s, the Old State Capitol was starting to show its age and proving to be too small for the expanding state government. Proposals were drawn up for a new building, but were never acted upon due to the lack of money and more important issues. In 1928, Huey Long was elected Governor of Louisiana as a populist candidate. Long seized upon the idea of using a new capitol as a way to symbolize the end of the "political domination of Louisiana's traditional social and economic elite" in the state. In January 1930, Long secured funds from the Board of Liquidation, enabling him to hire architects to design the new capitol and approached Leon C. Weiss with the proposal; Weiss' architectural firm Weiss, Dreyfous and Seiferth was well known for its many public buildings it had designed in Louisiana. By using funds that he controlled to start the design work, Long prevented the State Legislature from stopping the construction of the capitol. The designs for the capitol consisted of a modern skyscraper, sited on the former campus of the Louisiana State University, and expected to cost $1 million. In a special session of the State Legislature in September 1930, a bond issue for the final cost of the new capitol—$5 million—was passed despite initial reluctance from some of the legislators.

By November 1930, the designs for the building were finalized, and, on December 16, construction of the capitol was started. A spur from the nearby Yazoo and Mississippi Valley Railroad to the capitol was also built "to facilitate the delivery of the 2,500 carloads of necessary materials". Work on the building progressed rapidly due to the insistence by Long that it be completed under his governorship. Long, who had been elected to the United States Senate in 1930, delayed taking the oath of office until January 1932 to prevent a political adversary, Paul N. Cyr, from becoming governor. Despite being completed in little over a year, the State Capitol was not dedicated until May 16, 1932, during the inauguration of Governor Oscar K. Allen.

Upon its completion, Long claimed, "Only one building compares with [the Capitol] in architecture. That's St. Peter's Cathedral in Rome, Italy."

On September 8, 1935, Huey Long was assassinated in the State Capitol by Dr. Carl Weiss. Weiss, in turn, was gunned down shortly thereafter by members of the Louisiana State Police acting as Long's bodyguards. His alleged motivation for the attack was that his father-in-law, Judge Benjamin Pavy, was going to be gerrymandered out of office by Long. Long lingered for two days at the nearby Our Lady of the Lake Hospital before he died on September 10. His body lay in state at the State Capitol where approximately 100,000 people—some from as far away as Arkansas, Mississippi and Texas—paid their respects. On September 13, Long was interred on the grounds in front of the Capitol. In 1938, the State Legislature appropriated $50,000 to replace Long's original gravemarker, a simple tombstone, with a more monumental one; two years later, a marble pedestal surmounted by a bronze statue was erected.

On April 26, 1970, a bomb consisting of "twenty to 30 [sic] sticks of dynamite" was detonated in the Senate Chamber. The bomb was an apparent retaliation for the shootings of three African Americans by the police; a second bomb exploded at a Baton Rouge country club. A splinter of wood from a desk in the chamber remains embedded in the ceiling from the force of the explosion. The Louisiana State Capitol was added to the National Register of Historic Places on June 9, 1972, and was designated a National Historic Landmark on December 12, 1982.

== Exterior ==
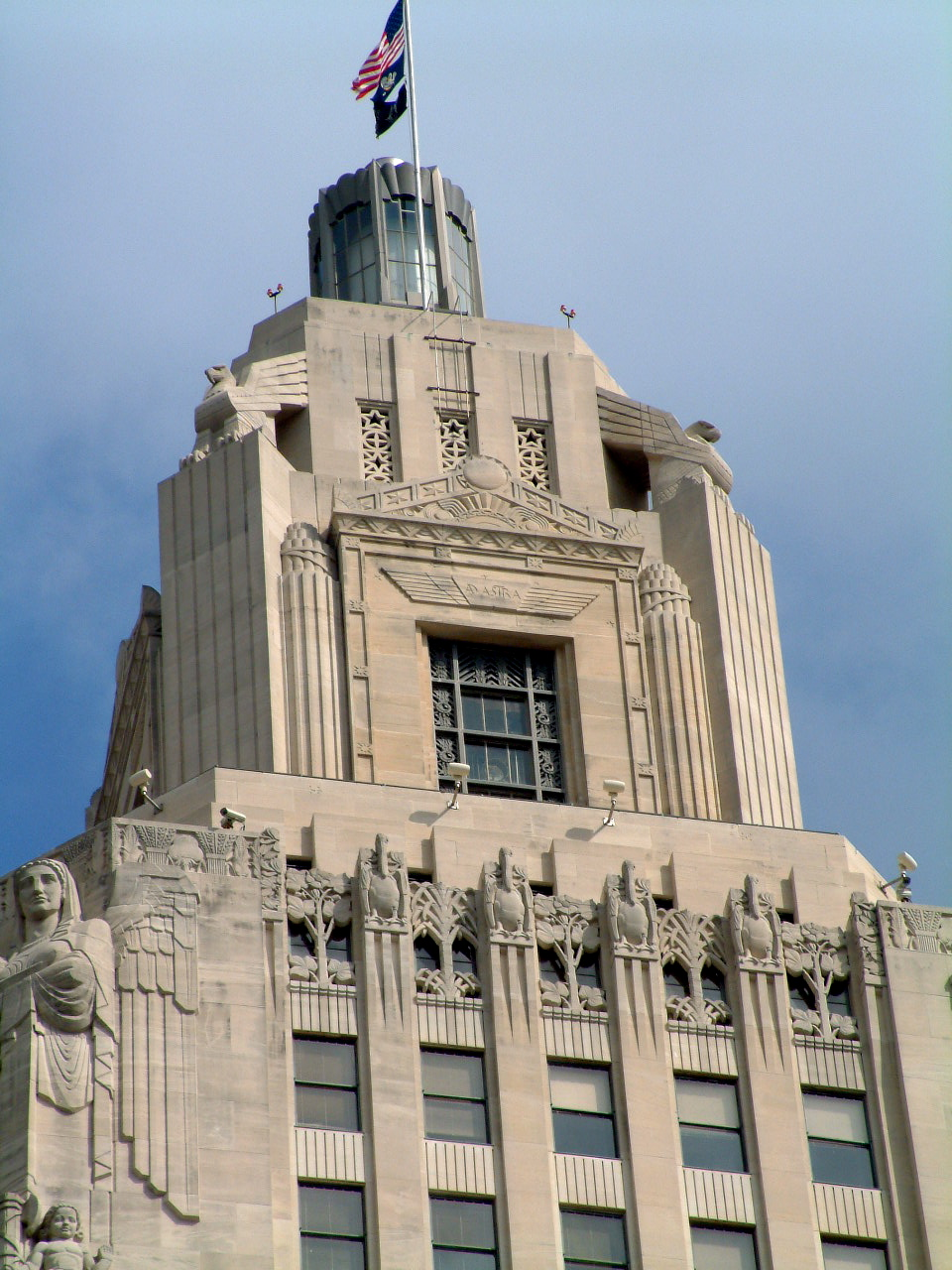
Closeup of the tower's cupola and beacon

The inspiration to reject the traditional "rotunda-dome-and-wing" capitol when designing Louisiana's came from Nebraska. At the time, the Nebraska State Capitol, designed by Bertram Goodhue, was under construction and was the first that was a modern skyscraper instead of traditionally being modeled on the United States Capitol. Despite the inefficiencies of floor space in early skyscrapers due to the presence of elevator shafts, Huey Long insisted that his capitol be a tower. The Louisiana State Capitol has 34 stories and is 450 feet (140 m) tall, making it the tallest capitol in the United States. (Note: Early articles about the capitol put it at 33 stories.) Currently, it is also the tallest building in Baton Rouge and the seventh tallest in Louisiana.

The Capitol's facade was constructed out of limestone from Alabama and is decorated with many sculptures and reliefs, and includes much of Louisiana's symbols and its history. A frieze designed by Ulric Ellerhusen runs along the top of the tower's base, at the fifth floor, depicting the actions of Louisianans in wartime and peace, from colonization to World War I. Between each pilaster on the outside of the House and Senate chambers is one of twenty-two square portraits of important persons in Louisiana history. (Note: The 22 persons depicted in the portraits, beginning on the left side of the front of the Capitol and going counterclockwise, are: Edward Livingston, William C. C. Claiborne, Jean-Baptiste Le Moyne, René-Robert Cavelier, Hernando de Soto, Andrew Jackson, Henry Watkins Allen, Edward Douglass White, Thomas Jefferson, Judah P. Benjamin, Richard Taylor, Francis T. Nicholls, P. G. T. Beauregard, Zachary Taylor, John McDonogh, Julien de Lallande Poydras, Judah Touro, Paul Tulane, Louis Moreau Gottschalk, John James Audubon, and Charles Gayarré.) The portraits were divided up among several New Orleans sculptors: Angela Gregory worked on eight, Albert Reiker on six, John Lachin and Rudolph Parducci jointly on six, and Juanita Gonzales completed two.

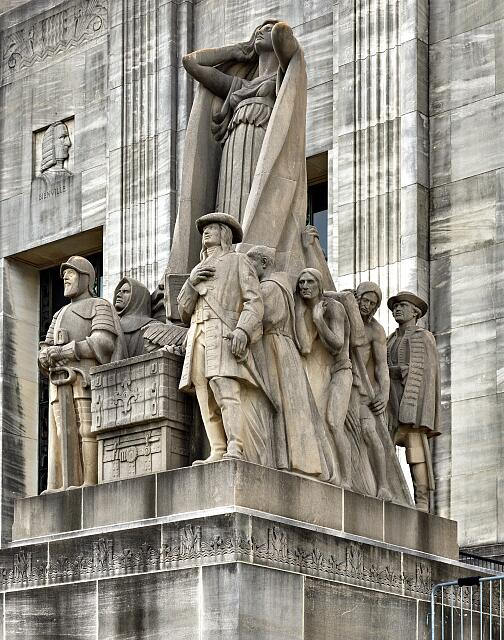
The Pioneers, one of two monumental sculptures by American artist Lorado Taft that bookend the front steps

The front doors to the Capitol are reached by a "monumental stairway" consisting of 49, Minnesota granite steps. Each step has engraved the name of a U.S. state in the order of its statehood; Alaska and Hawaii, which were admitted after the completion of the Capitol, are both on the last step along with the phrase "E pluribus unum". Flanking both sides of the stairs are free-standing, limestone sculptures by Lorado Taft entitled Pioneers and Patriots, respectively, memorializing both the early settlers and defenders of Louisiana. On either side of the front doors are reliefs designed by Adolph Alexander Weinman depicting allegorical scenes of government providing "protection and encouragement...to the welfare of its people." Contrasting with Weinmans's reliefs is Lee Lawrie's flatter architrave that frames the doors and portal; the architrave more closely resembles the style of ancient Egyptian reliefs.

The tower itself is relatively unadorned until the 21st floor, where the square tower starts to transition to an octagonal shape. Four allegorical busts representing Law, Science, Philosophy and Art are carved into the corners of the tower reaching from the 22nd to the 25th floor. The cupola, originally referred to as a "temple", is dominated by large windows on all four sides, each topped with a pediment. Four stone eagles act as flying buttresses from the top of the cupola to the beacon atop the tower. The State Capitol is topped with a 23-foot -tall (7 m) lantern "symbolizing the higher aspirations of Louisiana."

=== Gardens ===
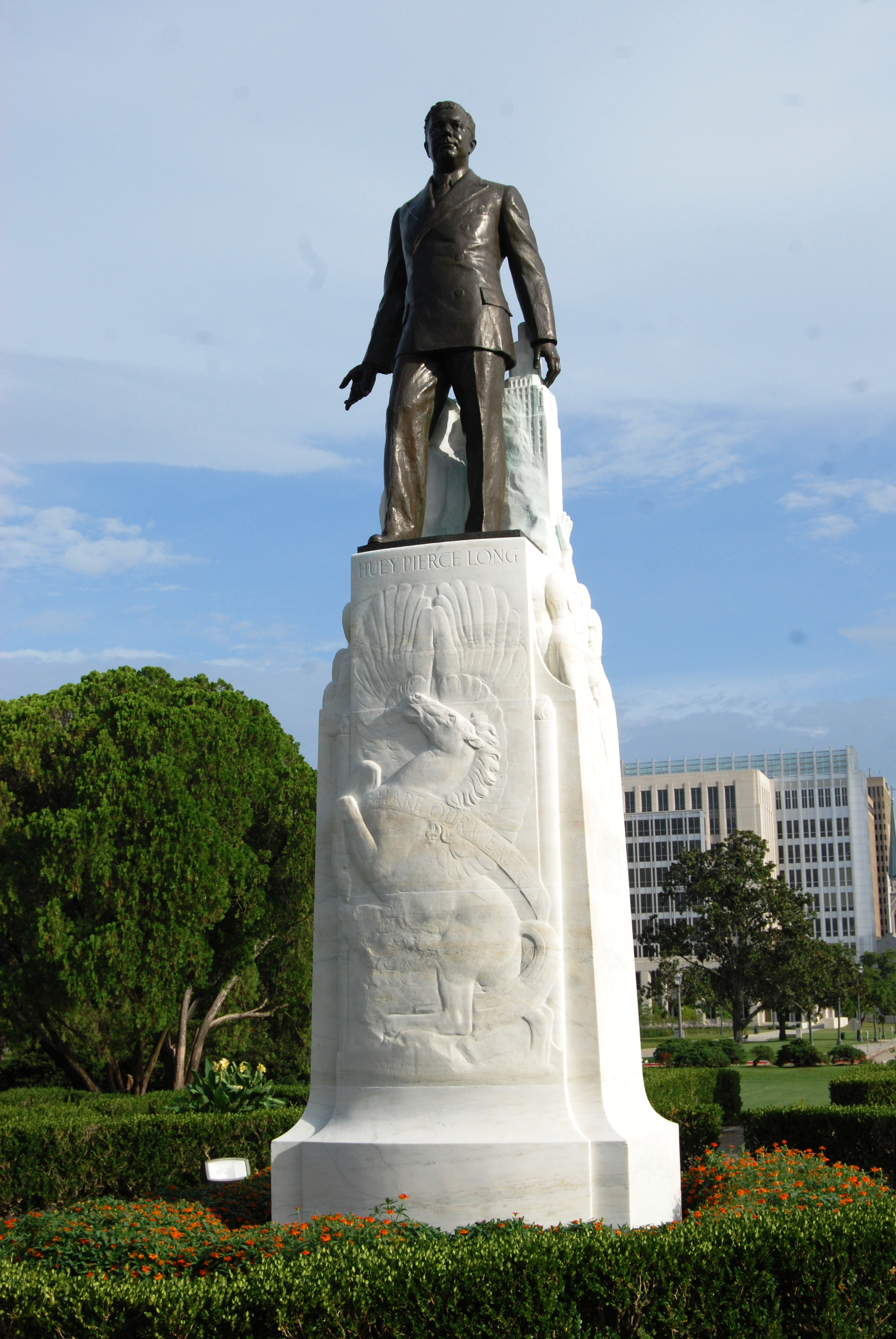
Gravemarker and statue of Huey Long

The Louisiana Capitol Garden comprises 30 acres (10 ha), the majority of which are laid out to the south and east of the capitol. The landscaping of the grounds was overseen by the capitol's architect Leon Weiss and was installed by Jungle Gardens on Avery Island. The gardens flora include azaleas, camellias and magnolias—the state flower of Louisiana. Many live oaks were also transported to Baton Rouge; a few oaks, which were already present and were incorporated into the gardens, are over 200 years old. The 10 miles (20 km) of sidewalks in the grounds are all lined with boxwood hedges.

The south park is 600 feet (200 m) square and is divided by two 20-foot (10 m) sidewalks extending from the capitol parking lot to Boyd Avenue. In its center is an arrangement of cris-crossing walks where the remains of Huey Long are interred; marking the spot is a 30-foot -tall (10 m) monument, including the 12-foot (4 m) bronze statue of Long, designed by Charles Keck. The grounds east of the capitol are less formal with "clusters of evergreens, palms, and small flower garden." The sidewalks east of the capitol end at the Old Arsenal, which has a 60-by-115-foot (18.3 m × 35.1 m) rose garden in front of it.

== Interior ==
The Louisiana State Capitol houses the chambers for the Louisiana House of Representatives, the Louisiana State Senate, the office of the Governor of Louisiana, and several other state offices. Huey Long had an apartment installed for his use on the 24th floor under the impression that the altitude would help alleviate his "hay fever". An observation deck, complete with a gift shop, is located on the 27th floor allowing views of Baton Rouge and the Mississippi River.

=== Memorial Hall ===
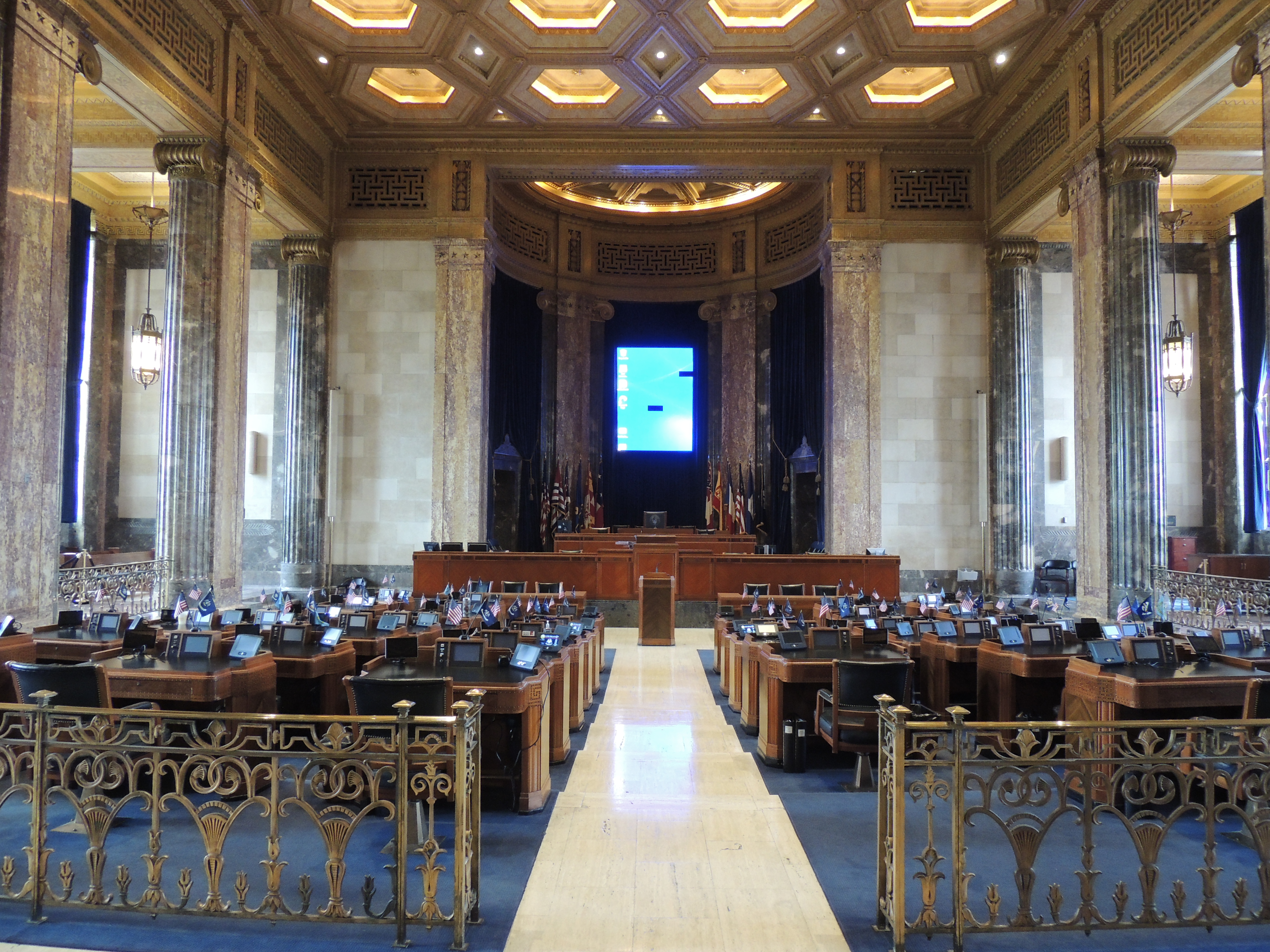
The senate chamber

The front entrance to the capitol opens directly into the four-story, rectangular Memorial Hall. The Hall is 124 feet (38 m) long and 40 feet (10 m) wide; it is often referred to as a "rotunda" despite not being round as it takes the place of one in a traditional domed capitol. Embedded in the floor, in the center of Memorial Hall, is a bronze plaque 10 feet (3.0 m) in diameter and weighing 3,290 pounds (1,490 kg). The plaque depicts a relief map of Louisiana showing parish boundaries and seats, industries and exports, and the flora and fauna of Louisiana. Mounted on the balcony over the elevator banks are the flags of the entities that have held dominion over Louisiana. (Note: In chronological order, from right to left, are the flags of Castile and Léon, Bourbon France, Great Britain, Spain, the French Tricolour, a 15-star U.S. flag, the flags of the Republic of West Florida, Republic of Louisiana, Confederate States of America, the Confederate battle flag, the state of Louisiana, and, flanking either side, a modern U.S. flag.)

=== House and Senate Chambers ===
The chambers for the Louisiana House of Representatives and State Senate, along with Memorial Hall, make up the majority of the capitol's broad base. The Louisiana House of Representatives and the Louisiana Senate meet here for 120 days during a regular session to make bills and either vote them into law or kill them.

== In popular culture ==
The 1975 television film The Deadly Tower, depicting the shootings at the University of Texas at Austin in 1966 by Charles Whitman, was filmed at the Louisiana State Capitol. The film was unable to use the actual tower in Austin. Instead, the capitol, which bore a similar appearance and whose grounds have a similar layout, was used.

The Louisiana State Capitol, especially the bronze plaque in Memorial Hall, is featured heavily in the 2006 film adaptation of Robert Penn Warren's novel All the King's Men. The novel itself was thought to be inspired by the life and assassination of Huey Long.

Featured in the opening scene pep rally of the 1988 film Everybody's All-American with the John Goodman character climbing up the Huey Long grave marker and statue.

== See also ==
- List of National Historic Landmarks in Louisiana
- List of tallest buildings in Louisiana
- List of tallest buildings in Baton Rouge
- List of state and territorial capitols in the United States
- National Register of Historic Places listings in East Baton Rouge Parish, Louisiana

== Sources ==
- Calhoun, Milburn; McGovern, Bernie, eds. (2008). "Louisiana Alamanc 2008–2009". Louisiana Almanac. Pelican Publishing. ISSN 0896-6206.
- Daniell, F. Raymond (September 13, 1935). "Thousands Mourn as Long is Buried". The New York Times. pp. 1, 15.
- "Doctor Shoots Huey Long in Louisiana State Capitol; Bodyguards Kill Assailant". The New York Times. September 9, 1935. pp. 1, 3.
- Federal Writers' Project (1941). Louisiana: A Guide to the State. New York City: Hastings House.
- Fortier, Alceé (1904). A History of Louisiana: Early Explorers and the Domination of the French. Vol. 1. New York City: Manzi, Joyant & Co.
- Fortier, Alceé (1909). Louisiana: Comprising Sketches of Counties, Towns, Events, Institutions, and Persons, Arranged in Cyclopedic Form. Vol. 1. Atlanta, Georgia: Southern Historical Association.
- Fricker, Jonathan (Summer 1978). "Louisiana State Capitol (Old State Capitol)". Historic American Buildings Survey. Library of Congress. HABS LA-1132. Archived from the original on February 18, 2022.
- Goeldner, Paul (January 18, 1974). "Old Capitol (Veterans' Memorial Building)". National Register of Historic Places Inventory—Nomination Form. National Park Service.
- Haase, Carol K (2009). Louisiana's Old State Capitol. Gretna, Louisiana: Pelican Publishing. ISBN 978-1-58980-615-3.
- Hitchcock, Henry Russell; Seale, William (1976). Temples of Democracy: the State Capitols of the USA. New York City: Harcourt Brace Jovanovich.
- Kubly, Vincent F (1977). The Louisiana Capitol: Its Art and Architecture. Gretna, Louisiana: Pelican Publishing. ISBN 0-88289-082-4.
- Millhollon, Michelle (July 11, 2012). "La. State Capitol getting $14.7 million overhaul". The Advocate. Baton Rouge. Archived from the original on March 4, 2016.
- "Senator Huey Long Dies of Wounds after 30-hour Futile Fight for Life; Troopers Guard Louisiana Capitol". The New York Times. September 10, 1935. pp. 1–2.
- Sheire, James W. "Louisiana State Capitol". National Register of Historic Places Inventory—Nomination Form. National Park Service.
- Twain, Mark (1883). Life on the Mississippi. Boston: James R. Osgood & Co.
- Williams, T. Harry (1969). Huey Long. New York City: Alfred A. Knopf. LCCN 69010692.

Records
Preceded by Hibernia Bank Building	Tallest building in Louisiana; 1932–1969	Succeeded by Plaza Tower
