= Pat Chappelle =

American theatre owner and entrepreneur (1869–1911)

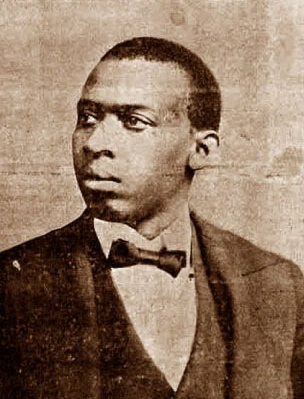
- Born: Patrick Henry Chappelle; January 7, 1869; Jacksonville, Florida, United States
- Died: October 21, 1911 (aged 42); Jacksonville, Florida, United States
- Occupations: Theatre owner, entrepreneur
- Known for: Owner and manager of The Rabbit's Foot Company, the first travelling vaudeville company owned and managed by African-Americans

Patrick Henry Chappelle (January 7, 1869 – October 21, 1911), was an American theatre owner and entrepreneur, who established and ran The Rabbit's Foot Company, a leading traveling vaudeville show in the first part of the twentieth century. He became known as one of the biggest employers of African Americans in the entertainment industry, with multiple tent traveling shows and partnerships in strings of theaters and saloons. Chappelle was described at that time as the "Pioneer of Negro Vaudeville" and "the black P. T. Barnum," and was the only African American to fully operate a traveling show solely composed of African-American entertainers.

== Early life ==
Chappelle was born in Jacksonville, Florida, the son of Lewis Chappelle and his wife Anna, who had been slaves in Newberry County, South Carolina. After slavery was abolished, they left South Carolina with their relatives and other freed slaves to help construct the suburban neighborhood of LaVilla in Jacksonville, which became a center of African-American culture in Florida. Lewis Chappelle and his brother Mitchell Chappelle worked on house construction and also held several political positions in LaVilla. Their other brother Julius Caesar Chappelle, Pat's uncle, also worked in construction in LaVilla and then moved to Boston, Massachusetts, where he became a legislator between 1883 and 1886, one of the early black Republicans in Boston (the Republican Party was founded by abolitionists).

Pat Chappelle was musically gifted. He and his brothers and cousin learned musical skills from some of their relatives – Pat learned how to play the guitar and piano, but was best known for his proficiency in banjo. He left school after the fourth grade and played guitar in traveling string bands. He started playing in hotels on the East Coast and was discovered by a prestigious vaudeville circuit owner, Benjamin Franklin Keith, who offered him bookings with the museum circuit in Boston and New York City. Later, he performed in Florida restaurants and saloons.

== Vaudeville traveling shows, theaters, and saloon businesses ==
In 1898, Chappelle returned to Jacksonville and organised his first traveling show, the Imperial Colored Minstrels (or Famous Imperial Minstrels), which featured comedian Arthur "Happy" Howe and toured successfully around the South. Early shows also featured ragtime pianist Prof. Fred Sulis, and white country music fiddler Blind Joe Mangrum (who went on to record for Victor Records as late as 1928). Chappelle also opened a pool hall in the commercial district of Jacksonville. Remodeled as the Excelsior Hall, it became the first black-owned theater in the South, reportedly seated 500 people, and also sold whiskey. In an August 20, 1898 article in The New York Times, it was stated that Chappelle, who was standing outside the saloon in Jacksonville, was "almost beaten to death" by an angry mob who blamed him as the proprietor for a dosing of soldiers inside the saloon with "knockout drops" by unknowns that caused some of the men to appear "completely insensible, seemingly lifeless" and left other "almost screaming with pain and writhing in convulsions." Pat Chappelle's life was saved by "Major Harrison, Provost Marshall, in ordering out a reserve guard." The article also reported that Chappelle "was terribly beaten and kicked."

In 1899, following a dispute with the white landlord of the Excelsior Hall, J. E. T. Bowden, who was also the Mayor of Jacksonville, Chappelle closed the theatre and stripped out its tiled floor and fixtures. He moved to Tampa, where he – with fellow African-American entrepreneur R. S. Donaldson – opened a new vaudeville house, the Buckingham, in the Fort Brooke neighborhood, using the Excelsior's fittings. The Tampa Morning Tribune reported that "[t]he mayor of Jacksonville is therefore after Chappell [sic], and there may develop an interesting local end to the story." Chappelle claimed that he owned the fittings, but eventually they were returned to Jacksonville and the charges against him were dropped. The Buckingham Theatre's Saloon opened in September 1899, and within a few months was reported to be "crowded to the doors every night with Cubans, Spaniards, Negroes and white people". In December 1899 Chappelle and Donaldson opened a second theatre, the Mascotte, closer to the center of Tampa.

In 1901, the Buckingham Theatre Saloon was advertised as offering fine imported wine, liquors, beer, and cigars, and when the theater was renovated, it had its grand opening on December 23, 1901, that made the next day's front page of the Morning Tribune in Tampa. The Theatre Saloon bought its fine Cuban cigars from a factory owned by Vicente Martinez Ybor in Ybor City. In 1903, while Pat was traveling with his Rabbit's Foot Company, he left his brother Louis in charge of the Buckingham Theatre Saloon. Louis was arrested and convicted of selling liquor without a license, and the Buckingham Theatre Saloon was closed. Pat Chappelle left his vaudeville company and rushed to Tampa to hire a lawyer who was able to gain pardon and release for Louis. Chappelle was fined, although the circumstances of the charge against him were deemed suspicious and the publicity did not seem to tarnish their reputations. In 1904, the Buckingham Theatre Saloon changed its name and reopened as the Red Fox Music Hall with a pool hall and fancy café with the additional marketing help of a cousin, Mitchell Chappelle, who also helped secure liquor licenses and license renewals to be in compliance with regulations.

== The Rabbit's Foot Company, Funny Folks Company and Chappelle Bros. ==
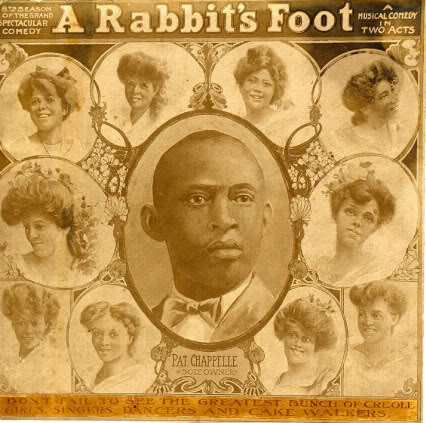
Cover of theatre programme, about 1908

The success of their shows at the Buckingham and Mascotte theatres in Tampa led Chappelle and Donaldson to announce their intention, in early 1900, to establish a traveling vaudeville show. Chappelle commissioned Frank Dumont of the Eleventh Street Theater in Philadelphia to write a show for the new company. In May 1900, Chappelle and Donaldson advertised for "60 Colored Performers.... Only those with reputation, male, female and juvenile of every description, Novelty Acts, Headliners, etc., for our new play 'A Rabbit's Foot'.... We will travel in our own train of hotel cars, and will exhibit under canvas...". In summer 1900, Chappelle decided to put the show into theatres rather than under tents, first in Paterson, New Jersey, and then in Brooklyn, New York. However, his bandmaster Frank Clermont left, his partnership with Donaldson dissolved, and business was poor. Chappelle later won a lawsuit against a rival company, Holland's Georgia Minstrels, for taking away Clermont.

In October 1901, the company launched its second season, with a roster of performers again led by Arthur "Happy" Howe, and toured in Alabama, Mississippi, Georgia and Florida. The show grew in popularity throughout the early years of the century, and played in both theatres and tents. Trading as Chappelle Bros., Pat Chappelle and his brothers, James E. Chappelle and Lewis W. Chappelle, rapidly organized a small vaudeville circuit, including theatre venues in Savannah, Georgia, as well as Jacksonville and Tampa. According to the later legal case between Pat Chappelle's widow and his brothers, James and Lewis claimed that the three brothers had established a co-partnership in 1900 to run both the traveling and theatre parts of the business; however, this was countered by the claim that the troupes taken out by Pat Chappelle were managed and conducted by him alone, and the court supported the latter view. Nevertheless, by 1902 it was said that the Chappelle Bros. circuit had full control of the African-American vaudeville business in that part of the country, "able to give from 12 to 14 weeks [of employment] to at least 75 performers and musicians" each season.

In Florida, theaters and opera houses that did not previously have segregation started to implement Jim Crow laws, after Booker T. Washington appeared on stage at a Florida theater before a crowd of different races sitting together. In order to increase attendance, and avoid some social problems of segregation by easily designating seating, Chappelle started using tents to perform in instead of local opera houses; this helped him increase his earnings to $1,000 a week that year. He stored his equipment in the winter at the Chappelle family property in LaVilla, Florida. In the periodical Crisis: A record of the darker Races a piece on "Along the Color Line Jim Crow" reported that Chappelle won a discrimination suit against the Louisville and Nashville Railroads. The Interstate Commerce Commission decided that, as the periodical put it, "Negro minstrels traveling in private cars are entitled to the same treatment as white occupants of such cars."

Chappelle was able to state, late in 1902, that he had "accomplished what no other Negro has done - he has successfully run a Negro show without the help of a single white man." As his business grew, he was able to own and manage multiple tent shows, and the Rabbit's Foot Company would travel to as many as sixteen states in a season. Chappelle was known for creating exciting shows, often coordinated with parades, or parades were organized around his show's appearances. This helped draw large crowds, even during a yellow fever scare. The company's parade was described by The Freeman as "one of the finest street parades in the country for minstrels." Diverse crowds of several thousand people were seen in attendance, and some of his spacing seated 25,000 people. He also included drama and classic opera in his shows, such as works by Verdi, chorus show girls, and a musical band that included ten brass players, later doubled in size. By doing this, he offered his talented team of performers the opportunity to star in different venues. The black entertainers were known to be of high quality, and Chappelle advertised in African-American newspapers to find and employ them, and develop their careers. The vaudeville was very popular and in high demand as it was known as "authentic" (not white blackface) and "clean negro" vaudeville, one of the few "authentic negro" vaudeville shows around. It traveled most successfully in the southeast and southwest, and also to Manhattan and Coney Island.

Chappelle also established an all-black baseball team, based in Jacksonville, but which toured with the company and played the local team in each city the company visited. The team claimed "the championship of the South and South-west", and operated at least until 1916.

By 1904 the Rabbit's Foot show featured more than 60 quality performers, had expanded to fill three Pullman railroad carriages, and was describing itself as "the leading Negro show in America". Pat's father Lewis Chappelle helped out as boss of the company since it had doubled in size, including the brass band that went from ten to twenty players. The show was reported to include minstrel performances, dancers, circus acts, "daring aerialists," comedy and musical ensemble pieces. For the 1904–05 season, the company included week-long stands in Washington, D.C., and Baltimore, Maryland. Two of its most popular performers were singing comedian Charles "Cuba" Santana and trombonist Amos Gilliard, though the latter defected to Rusco and Holland's Georgia Minstrels and claimed that Pat Chappelle and his brothers had threatened him at gunpoint before throwing him off the company train. Another performer, William Rainey, brought his young bride Gertrude (later known as "Ma" Rainey) to join the company in 1906.

In 1906, Chappelle launched travelling tent companies, the Funny Folks Comedy Company, managed by his cousin Mitchell P. Chappelle. The same performers, including Happy Howe and Cuba Santana, alternated between the two companies. As Pat Chappelle's business expanded, a correspondent in The Freeman in 1908 stated that "Mr. Chappelle has no equal when it comes to managing these kind of shows... he has proven to be the black P. T. Barnum, when it comes to the success of a Negro show." However, around 1907, his brothers Lewis and James quit working with Pat, after Pat expressed dissatisfaction with their work. Lewis went to work as a blacksmith and James became a horse caretaker.

In August 1908, one of the Pullman Company railroad carriages used by Chappelle burned to the ground in Shelby, North Carolina, while several of the vaudeville entertainers were asleep. The accident happened after one of their nearby horses accidentally kicked over a tank of gasoline near a cooking stove. The injured were taken to the Good Samaritan Hospital in Charlotte. One of the most severely injured was George Connelly, who had tried to save horses trapped in fire in a car stall; two of the horses died, but George saved one of them, and was mentioned as a hero by the media. Others who had escaped from the car unharmed still had to handle the loss of their clothes and other belongings, as well as the tragedy of the accident and those injured. Pat Chappelle was unharmed and quickly ordered a new carriage and eighty-foot round tent so the show could go on the following week. Financially, the tragedy cost him $10,000. He mentioned to The Freeman newspaper that the incident could have been prevented if there had been a fire department in the area, or at least water for a "bucket brigade." In 1909, Chappelle sued the Mobile and Ohio Railroad which overcharged for the transportation of his Pullman sleeper and baggage cars. He also tried to gather support to help lower the transportation rates of the Southern Railroad Association, as the high rates targeted the tour shows.

== Other activities ==
In the late 1890s and early 1900s, Chappelle successfully communicated with the mainstream African-American newspapers of his day, and articles about him and his family were published in a variety of black newspapers and magazines. The Freeman newspaper published his opinion pieces, covered the "Rabbit's Foot Comedy Company" on many occasions, and mentioned some of his family members in the society pages and obituary pages. Chappelle wrote, questioning why there were not more African-American owners of companies.

Chappelle invested much of his profits in real estate. In 1909 it was said that his investments in "twenty-five modern structures in the various sections, both business and residential, of the city of Jacksonville, and the $7,000 apartment building now in course of erection, as well as a large volume of business through the Afro-American bank of his native city, are encouraging signs of race progress".

== Retirement and death ==
By 1910, Chappelle was suffering from an unspecified illness and his doctor told him to rest. He went with his wife Rosa to the countryside in Georgia, and then to Atlanta. Pat returned to the tour but then left again in the winter of 1910; his brother Lewis took over some of the day-to-day operations, and his other brother James returned to work in ticketing. Despite Pat's non-attendance at his show that year, it was still a success. Pat and Rosa traveled in Europe, one aim being to see the celebrations of the coronation of King George V in England in June 1911, and were on the RMS Lusitania, according to U.S. passenger records. Pat told The Freeman newspaper that he had enough money to retire, and announced that he would not take his show out that year due to his health.

Pat Chappelle died in October 1911 at his home in LaVilla, aged 42. At his death, he was said to be "one of the wealthiest colored citizens of Jacksonville, Fla., owning much real estate".

== After his death ==
Pat Chappelle married Rosa (née Brooks) around 1906; they had no children. After his death, Rosa married Simuel Decatur McGill, who had worked in law offices and studied law in Boston. Chappelle died intestate, and his brothers Lewis and James claimed a share of his estate on the basis that the three had entered into a co-partnership in 1900, which remained extant, and that Pat was merely the manager of the touring part of the business while Lewis and James managed the businesses in Tampa. They also alleged that Pat Chappelle lived extravagantly. In 1916 the Supreme Court of Florida found in favor of Rosa and Simuel McGill, so that the entirety of Pat's estate, including business interests and a $10,000 life insurance policy, was left to Rosa and not to his brothers. Decades later in 1940, McGill gained national recognition for his involvement the United States Supreme Court case Chambers v. Florida that overturned the conviction of four African-American men that were sentenced to death.

His cousin Mitchell Chappelle became an African Methodist Episcopal Church minister, and held positions with civic organizations dedicated to helping African-Americans.

A white carnival owner, Fred S. Wolcott, bought the business in 1912 and kept The Rabbit's Foot Company successfully on tour, but it was no longer an authentic negro vaudeville and was thought of as more of a popular minstrel show with some blackface entertainers that would be considered demeaning by today's standards. Wolcott kept and attracted prominent African-American entertainers such as Ma Rainey. He moved the headquarters to Port Gibson, Mississippi, and it continued to tour until the late 1950s. A historic marker has been placed by the Mississippi Blues Commission at Port Gibson to commemorate the contribution that the Rabbit's Foot Company made to the development of the blues in Mississippi.
