= Mangrum =

Mangrum is a surname. Notable people with the name include:

- Blind Joe Mangrum (1856–1932), American fiddler
- Jim "Dandy" Mangrum (born 1948), lead singer for the American Southern rock band Black Oak
- Joe Mangrum (born 1969), American installation and multiple-medium artist
- Lloyd Mangrum (1914–1973), American golfer
- Nicole Mangrum (born 1974), American hairstylist
- Ray Mangrum (1910–1975), American golfer, brother of Lloyd
- Richard C. Mangrum (1906–1985), United States Marine Corps lieutenant general
