= Ida Cox =

American singer and vaudeville performer (1888 or 1896–1967)

Background information
- Born: Ida M. Prather; February 25, 1888 or 1896; Toccoa, Georgia, U.S.
- Died: November 10, 1967 Knoxville, Tennessee, U.S.
- Genres: Jazz, blues
- Occupation: Singer-songwriter
- Instrument: Vocals
- Years active: 1910s–1960

Ida M. Cox (née Prather; February 26, 1888 or 1896 – November 10, 1967) was an American singer and vaudeville performer, best known for her blues performances and recordings. She was billed as "The Uncrowned Queen of the Blues".

== Childhood and early career ==
Cox was born Ida M. Prather, the daughter of Lamax and Susie (née Knight) Prather in Toccoa, then Habersham County, Georgia, and grew up in Cedartown, Polk County, Georgia. Many sources give her birth date as February 26, 1896, but the researchers Bob Eagle and Eric LeBlanc have suggested she was born in 1888, and noted other evidence suggesting 1894. Her family lived and worked in the shadow of the Riverside Plantation, the private residence of the wealthy Prather family, from which her namesake came. She faced a future of poverty and few educational and employment opportunities.

Cox joined the local African Methodist Choir at an early age and developed an interest in gospel music and performance. At the age of 14, she left home to tour with White and Clark's Black & Tan Minstrels. She began her career on stage by playing Topsy, a "pickaninny" role commonly performed in vaudeville shows of the time, often in blackface. Cox's early experience with touring troupes included stints with other African-American travelling minstrel shows on the Theater Owners Booking Association vaudeville circuit: the Florida Orange Blossom Minstrels, the Silas Green Show, and the Rabbit Foot Minstrels.

The Rabbit Foot Minstrels, organized by F. S. Wolcott and based after 1918 in Port Gibson, Mississippi, were important not only for the development of Cox's performing career but also for launching the careers of her idols Ma Rainey and Bessie Smith.

Known colloquially as the Foots, the troupe provided a nurturing environment in which Cox developed her stage presence, but life on the vaudeville circuit was trying for performers and workers alike. Paul Oliver wrote, in The Story of the Blues, "The 'Foots' travelled in two cars and had an 80' x 110' tent which was raised by the roustabouts and canvassmen while a brass band would parade in town to advertise the coming of the show...The stage would be of boards on a folding frame and Coleman lanterns – gasoline mantle lamps – acted as footlights. There were no microphones; the weaker voiced singers used a megaphone, but most of the featured women blues singers scorned such aids to volume." When she was not singing, Cox performed as a sharp-witted comedian in vaudeville shows, gaining stage experience and cultivating her stage presence.

== Personal life ==
By 1908 (though some sources suggest 1916), she had married Adler Cox, who performed as a trumpeter with the Florida Orange Blossom Minstrels, a group with which she briefly toured. Their marriage was cut short by his death in World War I. She kept his surname for the rest of her performing career. In the early 1920s, she married Eugene Williams and gave birth to a daughter, Helen. Few other details are known of this marriage, which ended in divorce.

In 1927, she married Jesse "Tiny" Crump, a blues piano accompanist active on the Theater Owners Booking Association vaudeville circuit. Crump collaborated with her in the composition of many songs, including "Gypsy Glass Blues" and "Death Letter Blues", provided piano and organ accompaniment on several of her recordings, and served as manager of her blossoming career In the following years.

== Gaining popularity ==
By 1915, Cox had advanced from the "pickaninny" roles of her early minstrel years to singing the blues almost exclusively. In 1920, she left the vaudeville circuit briefly to appear as a headline act at the 81 Theatre in Atlanta, with the pianist Jelly Roll Morton. Her commanding stage presence and expressive delivery earned Cox star billing, and by the early 1920s, she was regarded as one of the finest solo acts offered by the shows that travelled the Theater Owners Booking Association circuit. In March 1922, a performance by Cox at the Beale Street Palace, in Memphis, Tennessee, was aired on radio station WMC with positive reviews, leading to exposure to a wider audience.

== Recording career ==
After the success of Mamie Smith's 1920 recording of "Crazy Blues", record companies became aware of a demand for recordings of race music. The classic female blues era had begun and would extend through the 1920s. With her popularity in the South rapidly increasing, Cox caught the attention of talent scouts and secured a contract with Paramount Records, the same company for which her idol Ma Rainey recorded. Paramount called her "The Uncrowned Queen of Blues". Between September 1923 and October 1929, she recorded 78 titles for Paramount. For her numerous recording sessions, Paramount provided Cox with outstanding backup musicians, including the pianist Lovie Austin and her band, the Blues Serenaders, featuring Jimmy O'Bryant (clarinet) and Tommy Ladnier (cornet). She also recorded two sides backed by the Pruitt Twins. During this period, Cox also recorded songs for other labels, including Broadway and Silvertone, using the pseudonyms Kate Lewis, Velma Bradley, Julia Powers, and Jane Smith.

== Raisin' Cain ==
In 1929, Cox and Crump formed their tent show revue, Raisin' Cain (after the biblical story of Cain and Abel and the resulting colloquialism). Cox performed as the title act, and Crump served as both accompanist and manager. Through the end of the 1920s and into the early 1930s, Raisin' Cain toured black theaters across the Southeast and westward through Texas, with shows in Florida, Alabama, Tennessee, Texas, Missouri, and Oklahoma, and performed several times in Chicago. The show had sixteen chorus girls, comics, and backup singers. The Raisin' Cain tent show proved so popular that in 1929 it became the first show associated with the Theater Owners Booking Association circuit to open at the famed Apollo Theater, in Harlem, New York. Cox, sometimes billed as the "Sepia Mae West", headlined touring companies into the 1930s. This was the pinnacle of her performing career.

By the end of the decade, the economic hardships of the Great Depression and the waning popularity of female blues singers made it difficult to maintain performances of the show, with frequent layoffs and gaps in its touring schedule. Cox continued her performing career through the 1930s. In 1935, she and Crump reorganized Raisin' Cain, which by then had been renamed Darktown Scandals, and continued to tour the South and Midwest until 1939. In the early 1930s drummer Earl Palmer entered show business as a tap dancer in Cox's Darktown Scandals revue.

== Later career and comeback ==
In 1939, she was invited to participate in the Carnegie Hall concert series From Spirituals to Swing produced by John Hammond in which she sang " 'Fore Day Creep" with James P. Johnson (piano), Lester Young (tenor saxophone), Buck Clayton (trumpet), and Dicky Wells (trombone). It gave her performing career a boost after the Depression. Cox recorded for Vocalion in 1939 and Okeh in 1940 with bands that included Charlie Christian, Hot Lips Page, Red Allen, J. C. Higginbotham, Lionel Hampton. She continued to perform until 1945, when she was forced into retirement after a debilitating stroke which occurred during a performance at a nightclub in Buffalo, New York. She moved to Knoxville, Tennessee, where she lived with her daughter, Helen Goode, and became active in her church.

One day every week, I prop myself at my front door
One day every week, I prop myself at my front door
And the police force couldn't move me 'fore that mail man blow
'Twas a little white paper Uncle Sam had done addressed to me
'Twas a little white paper Uncle Sam had done addressed to me.
It meant one more week, one more week of sweet prosperity
After four long years, Uncle Sam done put me on the shelf
After four long years, Uncle Sam done put me on the shelf
Cause that little pink slip means you got to go for yourself.
Ida Cox, Pink Slip Blues, 1940

Cox effectively disappeared from the music world until 1959 when John Hammond placed an ad in Variety magazine in search of her. After locating her, Hammond and the record producer Chris Albertson urged her to make another recording, and in 1961, 15 years after her last sessions, she recorded the album Blues for Rampart Street for Riverside with Roy Eldridge, Coleman Hawkins, Sammy Price, Milt Hinton, and Jo Jones. The album contained songs from her repertoire, including "Wild Women Don't Have the Blues", which found a new audience, including the singers Nancy Harrow and Barbara Dane, who recorded their own versions of the song. A review in The New York Times said that Cox at the age of 65 had lost quality in range and intonation but retained her charismatic and expressive delivery.

Cox referred to the album as her "final statement". After recording it, she returned to Knoxville to live with her daughter. She had another stroke in 1965. In 1967, she entered East Tennessee Baptist Hospital, where she died of cancer on November 10, 1967.

== Singing style ==
Consistent with her early career, Cox's style leaned more toward vaudeville than blues. She had a less powerful and less rugged voice than her better-known contemporaries Bessie Smith and Ma Rainey, but she held her audiences spellbound with the fiery spirit of her delivery. At the height of the classic female blues era, competition was stiff, with numerous talented blueswomen performing, and Cox's singing was only part of her act. Nevertheless, as her career developed, she assumed and embodied the title bestowed on her, "The Uncrowned Queen of the Blues". Onstage, she exuded a glamorous sophistication and confidence that captivated her fans. She also embellished her stage presence with a stylish wardrobe, which often included a tiara, cape and rhinestone wand.

== Independent spirit ==
The independent spirit that governed Cox's life and career was a characteristic shared by many early blues stars, including Bessie Smith, Ma Rainey, Sippie Wallace, and Victoria Spivey. Forced to exercise independence from an early age as a result of her teenage career in the minstrel circuits, Cox proved herself as an independent and astute businesswoman through her ability to organize and maintain her own troupe, Raisin' Cain, which lasted for a decade. She broke barriers in this regard, as virtually no black women owned and managed their own businesses in the 1920s and 1930s. She was one of the few female blues singers of the time to write her own songs.

Through her raw and sharp lyricism, Cox in her songs described the complex social realities of poor and working class African Americans in the early twentieth century. Her songs address topics of female independence, sexual liberation, and the social and political struggles of black Americans from a decidedly female perspective that became her trademark. One of Cox's most famous and enduring songs, "Wild Women Don't Have the Blues", is remembered as one of the earliest feminist anthems:

I've got a disposition and a way of my own,
When my man starts to kicking I let him find a new home,
I get full of good liquor, walk the street all night
Go home and put my man out if he don't act right
Wild women don't worry,
Wild women don't have the blues.

== Legacy ==
On April 16, 2026, statues of Cox and three other local African American luminaries were unveiled outside of Covenant Health Park in Knoxville, Tennessee.

== Discography ==
- 1923-00 - Complete Recorded Works, vol. 1 (Document Recs, 1997) Paramount recordings
- 1924-25 - Complete Recorded Works, vol. 2 (Document Recs, 2000) Paramount recordings
- 1925-27 - Complete Recorded Works, vol. 3 (Document Recs, 2000) Paramount recordings
- 1927-38 - Complete Recorded Works, vol. 4 (Document Recs, 2000) Paramount recordings
- 1939-40 - Complete Recorded Works, vol. 5 (Document Recs, 2000) Paramount recordings
- 1960 - Blues for Rampart Street (Riverside,1961) With Coleman Hawkins quintet
- 1923-38 The Essential (2xCD) (Classic Blues, 2001) an anthology from the Document albums
