= Frank Dumont =

American entertainer

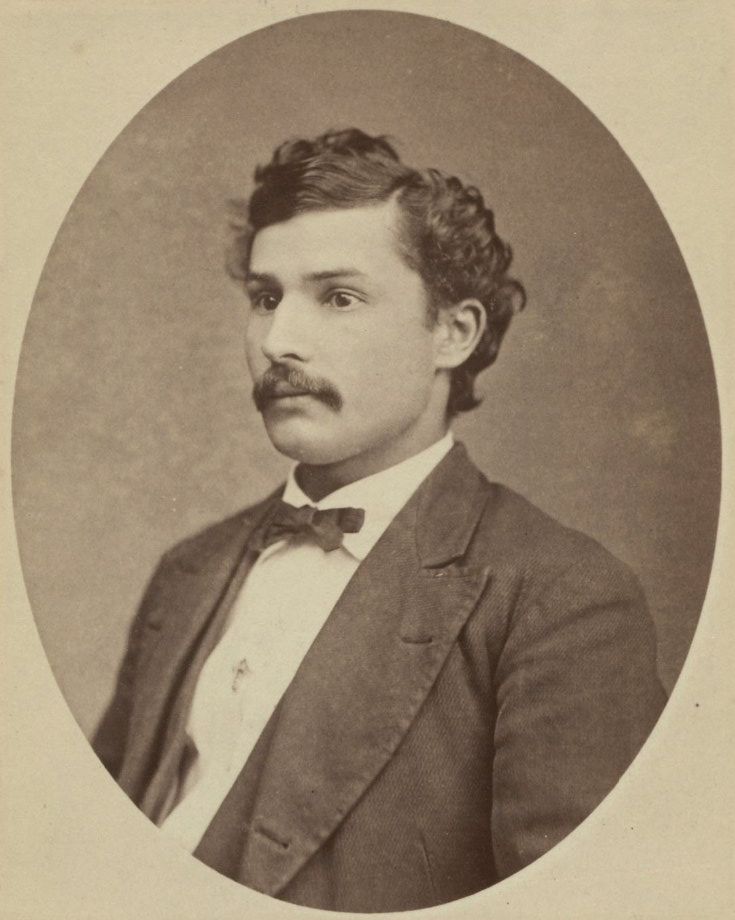
- Born: January 25, 1848; Utica, New York, U.S.
- Died: March 17, 1919 (aged 71); Philadelphia, Pennsylvania, U.S.
- Resting place: Laurel Hill Cemetery, Philadelphia, Pennsylvania, U.S.
- Occupations: Minstrel show performer and manager

Frank Dumont (January 25, 1848 – March 17, 1919) was an American minstrel show performer and manager.

== Life ==
Dumont was born in Utica, New York, on January 25, 1848. He started performing in minstrel shows as early as 1862, and worked with a number of groups, including Duprez & Benedict's Minstrels from about 1869 to 1881. He eventually founded "Dumont's Minstrels", around 1895/96, after purchasing the Eleventh Street Opera House in Philadelphia. He authored many sketches and songs for the genre. One afterpiece he wrote was later expanded into a successful 1884 play, A Parlor Match.

After the Opera House closed circa 1909, Dumont acquired Dime Museum at Ninth and Arch Streets and renamed it "Dumont's Theatre". He died in the box office of the theatre on March 17, 1919, during the opening number of that afternoon's matinee show. He is interred at Laurel Hill Cemetery in Philadelphia.

Dumont's 1899 work "The Witmark amateur minstrel guide and burnt cork encyclopedia" is a valuable resource on the history of American minstrelsy.

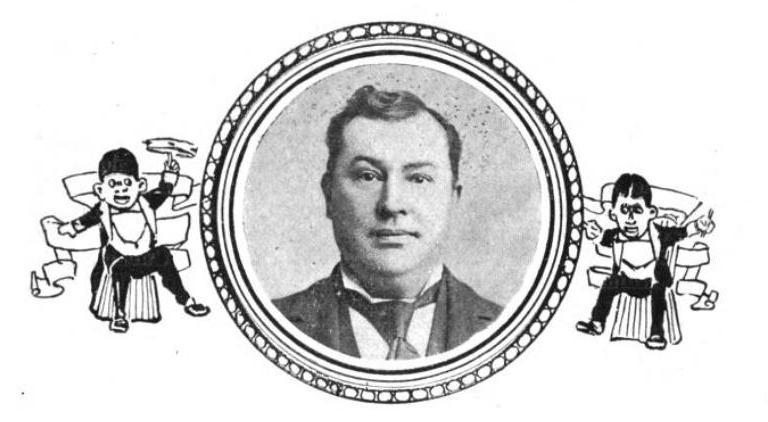
Dumont, from The Witmark amateur minstrel guide and burnt cork encyclopedia (1899)

Dumont wrote in 1915 that he had been the first to perform two classic 19th century standards, "Silver Threads Among the Gold", and "When You and I Were Young, Maggie".

Pat Chappelle commissioned Dumont in 1900 to write A Rabbit's Foot, a comedy-based show that became a hit and led to the creation of Chappelle's "Rabbit's Foot (Comedy) Company." Chappelle was the first black owner of a vaudeville company with an all-black cast, and utilized upscale performers that helped him dominate the southwest and southeastern areas of the U.S. and also traveled to New Jersey, New York, Washington, D.C., and Baltimore.

He died in 1919 and was interred at Laurel Hill Cemetery in Philadelphia.
