= Ma Rainey =

American blues singer (1886–1939)

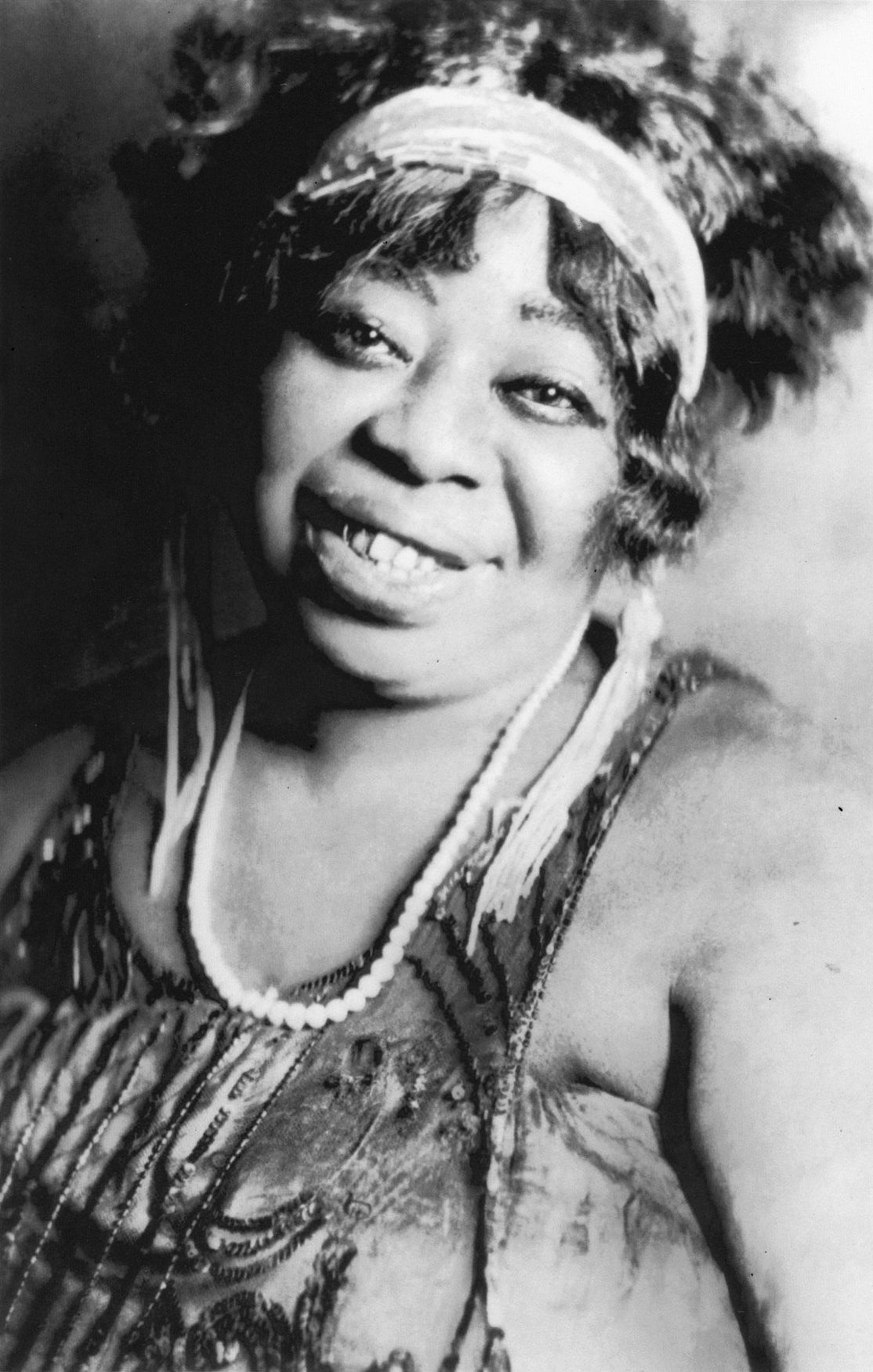
- Rainey in 1917

Background information
- Born: Gertrude Pridgett; April 26, 1886; Columbus, Georgia, U.S.
- Died: December 22, 1939 (aged 53) Columbus, Georgia, U.S.
- Genres: Blues; classic female blues
- Occupation: Singer
- Years active: 1899–1939
- Label: Paramount

Gertrude "Ma" Rainey (née Pridgett; April 26, 1886 – December 22, 1939) was an American blues singer and influential early-blues recording artist. Dubbed the "Mother of the Blues", she bridged earlier vaudeville and the authentic expression of southern blues, influencing a generation of blues singers. Rainey was known for her powerful vocal abilities, energetic disposition, majestic phrasing, and a "moaning" style of singing. Her qualities are present and most evident in her early recordings "Bo-Weevil Blues" and "Moonshine Blues".

Gertrude Pridgett began performing as a teenager and became known as "Ma" Rainey after her marriage to Will "Pa" Rainey in 1904. They toured with the Rabbit Foot Minstrels and later formed their own group, Rainey and Rainey, Assassinators of the Blues. Her first recording was made in 1923. In the following five years, she made over 100 recordings, including "Bo-Weevil Blues" (1923), "Moonshine Blues" (1923), "See See Rider Blues" (1925), the blues standard "Ma Rainey's Black Bottom" (1927), and "Soon This Morning" (1927).

Rainey also collaborated with Thomas Dorsey, Tampa Red, and Louis Armstrong, and toured and recorded with the Georgia Jazz Band. Touring until 1935, she then largely retired from performing and continued as a theater impresario in her hometown of Columbus, Georgia, until her death four years later. She has been posthumously inducted into the Blues Hall of Fame, as well as the Rock and Roll Hall of Fame. Rainey has been portrayed in several films including the 2020 Academy Award-winning film Ma Rainey's Black Bottom. In 2023, she was honored with the Grammy Lifetime Achievement Award.

== Early life ==
There is uncertainty about the birth date of Gertrude Pridgett. Some sources indicate that she was born in 1882, while most sources assert that she was born on April 26, 1886. Pridgett claimed to have been born on April 26, 1886 (beginning with the 1910 census, taken April 25, 1910), in Columbus, Georgia. However, the 1900 census indicates that she was born in September 1882 in Alabama, and researchers Bob Eagle and Eric LeBlanc suggest that her birthplace was in Russell County, Alabama. She was the second of five children of Thomas and Ella (née Allen) Pridgett, from Alabama. She had at least two brothers and a sister, Malissa Pridgett Nix.

In February 1904, Ma Rainey married William "Pa" Rainey. She took on the stage name "Ma Rainey", which was "a play on her husband's nickname, 'Pa'".

== Early career ==
Pridgett began her career as a performer at a talent show in Columbus, Georgia, when she was approximately 12 to 14 years old. A member of the First African Baptist Church, she began performing in black minstrel shows. She later claimed that she was first exposed to blues music around 1902. She formed the Alabama Fun Makers Company with her husband, Will Rainey, but in 1906 they both joined Pat Chappelle's much larger and more popular Rabbit's Foot Company, where they were billed together as "Black Face Song and Dance Comedians, Jubilee Singers [and] Cake Walkers". In 1910, she was described as "Mrs. Gertrude Rainey, our coon shouter". She continued with the Rabbit's Foot Company after it was taken over by a new owner, F. S. Wolcott, in 1912. Rainey said she found "Blues Music" when she was in Missouri one night performing, and a girl introduced her to a sad song about a man leaving a woman. Rainey said she learned the lyrics of the song and added it to her performances. Rainey claimed she created the term "blues" when asked what kind of song she was singing.

Beginning in 1914, the Raineys were billed as Rainey and Rainey, Assassinators of the Blues. Wintering in New Orleans, she met numerous musicians, including Joe "King" Oliver, Louis Armstrong, Sidney Bechet and Pops Foster. As the popularity of blues music increased, she became well known. Around this time, she met Bessie Smith, a young blues singer who was also making a name for herself. A story later developed that Rainey kidnapped Smith, forced her to join the Rabbit's Foot Minstrels, and taught her to sing the blues; the story was disputed by Smith's sister-in-law Maud Smith.

== Recording career ==
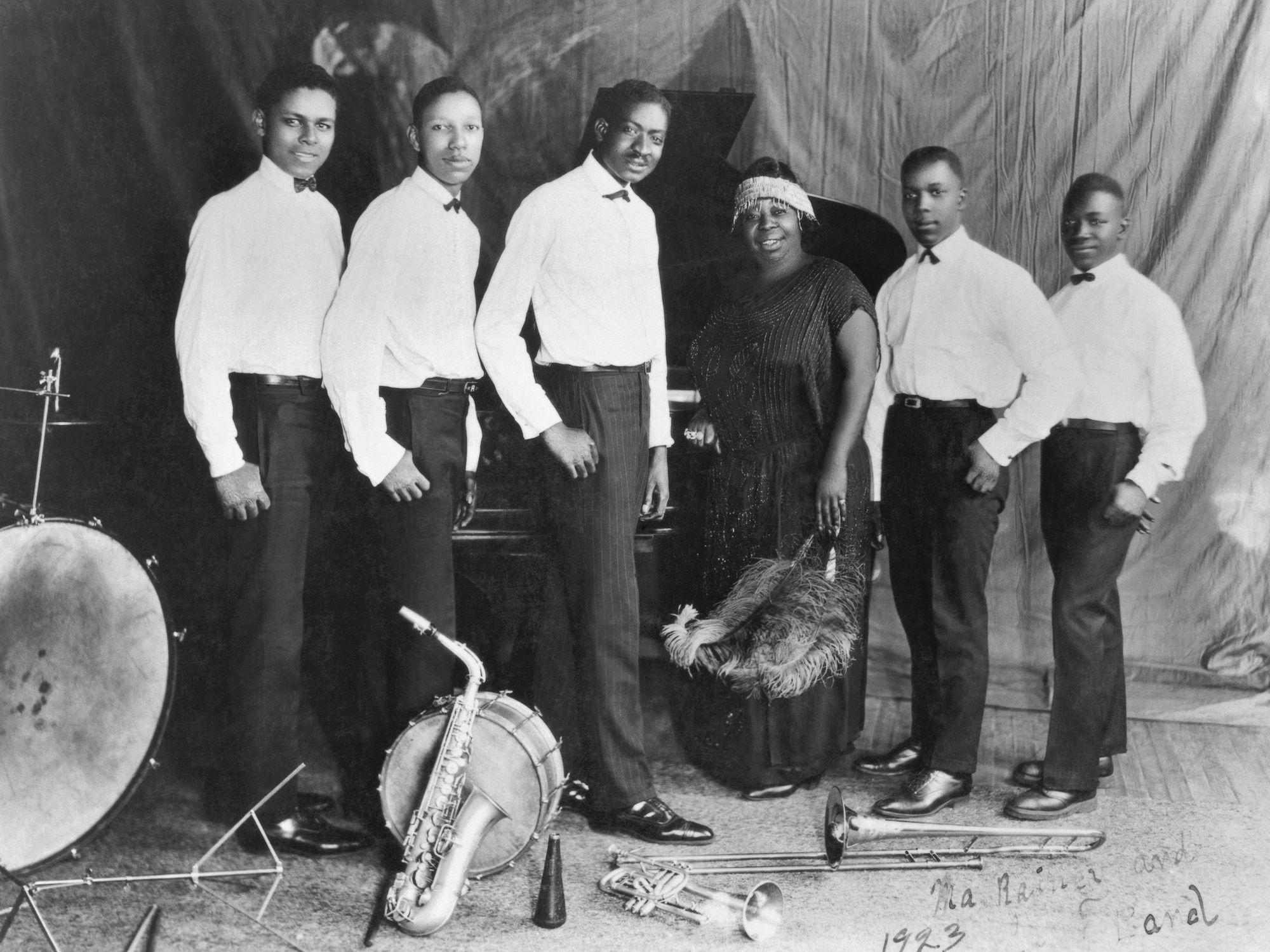
Rainey and the band

From the late 1910s, there was an increasing demand for recordings by black musicians. In 1920, Mamie Smith was the first black woman to be recorded. In 1923, Rainey was discovered by Paramount Records producer J. Mayo Williams. She signed a recording contract with Paramount, and in December she made her first eight recordings in Chicago, including "Bad Luck Blues", "Bo-Weevil Blues", and "Moonshine Blues". She made more than 100 other recordings over the next five years, which brought her fame beyond the South. Paramount marketed her extensively, calling her the "Mother of the Blues", the "Songbird of the South", the "Gold-Neck Woman of the Blues" and the "Paramount Wildcat".

In 1924, Rainey recorded with Louis Armstrong, including on "Jelly Bean Blues", "Countin' the Blues" and "See, See Rider". In the same year, she embarked on a tour of the Theater Owners Booking Association (TOBA) in the South and Midwest of the United States, singing for black and white audiences. She was accompanied by the bandleader and pianist Thomas Dorsey and the band he assembled, the Wildcats Jazz Band. They began their tour with an appearance in Chicago in April 1924 and continued, on and off, until 1928. Dorsey left the group in 1926 because of ill health and was replaced as pianist by Lillian Hardaway Henderson, the wife of Rainey's cornetist Fuller Henderson, who became the band's leader.

Although most of Rainey's songs that mention sexuality refer to love affairs with men, some of her lyrics contain references to lesbianism or bisexuality, such as the 1928 song "Prove It on Me":

They said I do it, ain't nobody caught me.
Sure got to prove it on me.
Went out last night with a crowd of my friends.
They must've been women, 'cause I don't like no men.
It's true I wear a collar and tie.
Makes the wind blow all the while.

According to the Queer Cultural Center's website, the lyrics refer to an incident in 1925 in which Rainey was "arrested for taking part in an orgy at [her] home involving women in her chorus". The political activist and scholar Angela Y. Davis noted that "'Prove It on Me' is a cultural precursor to the lesbian cultural movement of the 1970s, which began to crystallize around the performance and recording of lesbian-affirming songs." At the time, an ad for the song embraced the genderbending outlined in the lyrics and featured Rainey in a three-piece suit, mingling with women while a police officer lurks nearby.

Unlike many blues singers of her day, Rainey wrote at least a third of the songs she sang including many of her most famous works such as "Moonshine Blues" and "Ma Rainey's Black Bottom" which would become standards of the "classic blues" genre.

Throughout the 1920s, Ma Rainey had a reputation for being one of the most dynamic performers in the United States due in large part to her songwriting, showmanship, and voice. She and her band could fetch earnings of $350 a week on tour with the Theater Owners Booking Association, which was double that of Bessie Brown and George Williams while a little over half what Bessie Smith would ultimately command.

Toward the end of the 1920s, live vaudeville went into decline, being replaced by radio and recordings. Ma Rainey and Pa Rainey adopted a son named Danny who later joined his parents' musical act. Rainey developed a relationship with Bessie Smith. They became so close that rumors circulated that their relationship was possibly also romantic in nature. It was also rumored that Smith once bailed Ma Rainey out of jail.

The Raineys separated in 1916.

In 1930, Rainey released her hit single "Black Eye Blues," which recounted the fictional story of Miss Nancy, a woman who was brutalized by her husband's violence and infidelity.

In 1935, Rainey returned to her hometown, Columbus, Georgia, and became the proprietress of three theaters, the Liberty in Columbus, and the Lyric and the Airdrome in Rome, Georgia, until her death. She died of a heart attack in 1939.

== Legacy and honors ==
Ma Rainey created what is now known as "classic blues" while also portraying black life like never before. As a musical innovator she built on the minstrelsy and vaudeville performative traditions with comedic timing and a hybrid of American blues traditions she encountered in her vast tours across the country. She helped to pioneer a genre that appealed to North and South, rural and urban audiences.

Her signature low and gravelly voice, delivered in a style associated with Rainey's gusto and authoritative style, inspired imitators from Louis Armstrong, Janis Joplin and Bonnie Raitt among others.

In her lyrics, Rainey portrayed the black female experience like few others of the time reflecting a wide range of emotions and experiences. In her 1999 book Blues Legacies and Black Feminism, Angela Davis wrote that Rainey's songs are full of women who "explicitly celebrate their right to conduct themselves as expansively and even as undesirably as men". In her songs, she and other black women sleep around for revenge, drink and party all night and generally live lives that "transgressed these ideas of white middle class female respectability". The portrayals of black female sexuality, including those bucking heteronormative standards, fought ideas of what a woman should be and inspired Alice Walker in developing her characters for The Color Purple. Bragging about sexual escapades was popular in men's songs at the time but her use of these themes in her works established her as both fiercely independent and fearless and many have drawn connections between her use of these themes and their modern use in Hip-Hop.

Rainey was also a fashion icon who pioneered flashy, expensive costuming in her performances, wearing ostrich plumes, satin gowns, sequins, gold necklaces, diamond tiaras, and gold teeth.

Rainey was inducted into the Blues Foundation's Hall of Fame in 1983 and the Rock and Roll Hall of Fame in 1990. In 1994, the U.S. Post Office issued a 29-cent commemorative postage stamp honoring her. In 2004, "See See Rider Blues" (performed in 1924) was inducted into the Grammy Hall of Fame and was added to the National Recording Registry by the National Recording Preservation Board of the Library of Congress.

In 2007, a small museum dedicated to Ma Rainey opened in Columbus, Georgia, in the house that she had built for her mother and later lived in from 1935 until her death in 1939.

The first annual Ma Rainey International Blues Festival was held in April 2016 in Columbus, near the home that Rainey lived in at the time of her death. In 2017, the Rainey-McCullers School of the Arts opened in Columbus, named in honor of Rainey and author Carson McCullers.

In 2023, Rainey was awarded a posthumous Grammy Lifetime Achievement Award. The announcement noted her "deep voice and mesmerizing stage presence" and that she, "recorded almost 100 records, many of them national hits that are now part of the American musical canon".

== In popular culture ==
Sterling A. Brown wrote the poem "Ma Rainey" in 1932 about how "When Ma Rainey / comes to town" people everywhere would hear her sing. In 1981, Sandra Lieb wrote the first full-length book about Rainey titled Mother of the Blues: A Study of Ma Rainey.

Ma Rainey's Black Bottom, a 1982 play by August Wilson, is a fictionalized account of a recording of her song of the same title set in 1927. Theresa Merritt and Whoopi Goldberg starred as Rainey in the original and revival Broadway productions, respectively. Viola Davis portrayed Rainey in the 2020 film adaptation of the play and was nominated for the Academy Award for Best Actress.

Mo'Nique played Rainey in the 2015 television film Bessie about the life of Bessie Smith, for which she earned a nomination for Primetime Emmy Award for Outstanding Supporting Actress in a Limited Series or Movie.

== Discography ==
- 1923-28 - Mother Of The Blues (5xCD) (JSP, 2007)
- 1923-24 - Complete Recorded Works In Chronological Order Vol.1 (Document Recs, 1997)
- 1924-25 - Complete Recorded Works In Chronological Order Vol.2 (Document Recs, 1997)
- 1925-26 - Complete Recorded Works In Chronological Order Vol.3 (Document Recs, 1997)
- 1926-27 - Complete Recorded Works In Chronological Order Vol.4 (Document Recs, 1997)
- 1928-00 - Complete 1928 Sessions Chronological Order Vol.4 (Document Recs, 1993

This sortable table presents all 94 titles recorded by Rainey.

- The recording dates are approximate.
- The classification, by Sandra Lieb, is almost entirely by form. Blues songs that are only partly of twelve-bar structure are classified as mixtures of blues and popular song forms. Songs without any twelve-bar or eight-bar structure are classified as non-blues.
- Click any label to sort. To return to chronological order, click #.

| # | Matrix | Recording date | Title | Accompaniment | Paramount issue no. | Sandra Lieb classification | JSP 77933 | Document DOCD | Notes |
|---|---|---|---|---|---|---|---|---|---|
| 01 | 1596 | 1923/12 | "Bad Luck Blues" | Lovie Austin; Blues Serenaders | 12081 | Twelve-bar blues | A | 5581 | |
| 02 | 1597 | 1923/12 | "Bo-Weavil Blues" | Lovie Austin; Blues Serenaders | 12080 | Mixture of blues and popular song forms | A | 5581 | Another take on JSP & DOCD |
| 03 | 1598 | 1923/12 | "Barrel House Blues" | Lovie Austin; Blues Serenaders | 12082 | Twelve-bar blues | A | 5581 | |
| 04 | 1599 | 1923/12 | "Those All Night Long Blues" | Lovie Austin; Blues Serenaders | 12081 | Non-blues | A | 5581 | Another take on JSP & DOCD |
| 05 | 1608 | 1923/12 | "Moonshine Blues" | Lovie Austin; Blues Serenaders | 12083 | Mixture of blues and popular song forms | A | 5581 | |
| 06 | 1609 | 1923/12 | "Last Minute Blues" | Lovie Austin; Blues Serenaders | 12080 | Twelve-bar blues | A | 5581 | |
| 07 | 1612 | 1923/12 | "Southern Blues" | Lovie Austin; Blues Serenaders | 12083 | Twelve-bar blues | A | 5581 | |
| 08 | 1613 | 1923/12 | "Walking Blues" | Lovie Austin; Blues Serenaders | 12082 | Twelve-bar blues | A | 5581 | |
| 09 | 1698 | 1924/03 | "Lost Wandering Blues" | The Pruitt Twins | 12098 | Twelve-bar blues | A | 5581 | |
| 10 | 1699 | 1924/03 | "Dream Blues" | The Pruitt Twins | 12098 | Twelve-bar blues | A | 5581 | |
| 11 | 1701 | 1924/03 | "Honey Where You Been So Long?" | Lovie Austin; Blues Serenaders | 12200 | Non-blues | A | 5581 | |
| 12 | 1702 | 1924/03 | "Ya-Da-Do" | Her Georgia Jazz Band | 12257 | Non-blues | A | 5581 | Another take on JSP & DOCD |
| 13 | 1703 | 1924/03 | "Those Dogs of Mine" "(Famous Cornfield Blues)" | Lovie Austin; Blues Serenaders | 12215 | Non-blues | A | 5581 | |
| 14 | 1704 | 1924/03 | "Lucky Rock Blues" | Lovie Austin; Blues Serenaders | 12215 | Mixture of blues and popular song forms | A | 5581 | |
| 15 | 1741 | 1924/04 | "South Bound Blues" | Her Georgia Jazz Band | 12227 | Non-blues | A | 5581 | |
| 16 | 1758 | 1924/05 | "Lawd Send Me a Man Blues" | Her Georgia Jazz Band | 12227 | Non-blues | A | 5581 | |
| 17 | 1759 | 1924/05 | "Ma Rainey's Mystery Record" | Lovie Austin; Blues Serenaders | 12200 | Twelve-bar blues | A | 5581 | |
| 18 | 1824 | 1924/08 | "Shave 'Em Dry Blues" | The Pruitt Twins | 12222 | Eight-bar blues | B | 5581 | |
| 19 | 1825 | 1924/08 | "Farewell Daddy Blues" | The Pruitt Twins | 12222 | Twelve-bar blues | B | 5581 | |
| 20 | 1922 | 1924/10 | "Booze and Blues" | Her Georgia Jazz Band | 12242 | Twelve-bar blues | B | 5582 | |
| 21 | 1923 | 1924/10 | "Toad Frog Blues" | Her Georgia Jazz Band | 12242 | Twelve-bar blues | B | 5582 | |
| 22 | 1924 | 1924/10 | "Jealous Hearted Blues" | Her Georgia Jazz Band | 12252 | Twelve-bar blues | B | 5582 | |
| 23 | 1925 | 1924/10 | "See See Rider Blues" | Her Georgia Jazz Band | 12252 | Mixture of blues and popular song forms | B | 5582 | With Louis Armstrong; another take on JSP & DOCD |
| 24 | 1926 | 1924/10 | "Jelly Bean Blues" | Her Georgia Jazz Band | 12238 | Mixture of blues and popular song forms | B | 5582 | With Louis Armstrong |
| 25 | 1927 | 1924/10 | "Countin' the Blues" | Her Georgia Jazz Band | 12238 | Twelve-bar blues | B | 5582 | With Louis Armstrong; another take on JSP & DOCD |
| 26 | 10001 | 1924/11 | "Cell Bound Blues" | Her Georgia Jazz Band | 12257 | Mixture of blues and popular song forms | B | 5582 | |
| 27 | 2136 | 1925/05 | "Army Camp Harmony Blues" | Her Georgia Jazz Band | 12284 | Twelve-bar blues | B | 5582 | Another take on JSP & DOCD |
| 28 | 2137 | 1925/05 | "Explaining the Blues" | Her Georgia Jazz Band | 12284 | Twelve-bar blues | B | 5582 | Another take on JSP & DOCD |
| 29 | 2138 | 1925/05 | "Louisiana Hoo Doo Blues" | Her Georgia Jazz Band | 12290 | Twelve-bar blues | B | 5582 | |
| 30 | 2138 | 1925/05 | "Goodbye Daddy Blues" | Her Georgia Jazz Band | 12290 | Mixture of blues and popular song forms | B | 5582 | |
| 31 | 2209 | 1925/05 | "Stormy Seas Blues" | Her Georgia Band | 12295 | Twelve-bar blues | B | 5582 | Another take on DOCD5625 |
| 32 | 2210 | 1925/08 | "Rough and Tumble Blues" | Her Georgia Band | 12311 | Twelve-bar blues | B | 5582 | |
| 33 | 2211 | 1925/08 | "Night Time Blues" | Her Georgia Band | 12303 | Twelve-bar blues | B | 5582 | Another take on JSP & DOCD |
| 34 | 2212 | 1925/08 | "Levee Camp Moan" | Her Georgia Band | 12295 | Non-blues | B | 5582 | |
| 35 | 2213 | 1925/08 | "Four Day Honorary Scat" | Her Georgia Band | 12303 | Non-blues | B | 5582 | Misprint for "'Fore Day"; another take on JSP & DOCD |
| 36 | 2214 | 1925/08 | "Memphis Bound Blues" | Her Georgia Band | 12311 | Twelve-bar blues | B | 5582 | |
| 37 | 2369 | 1925/12 | "Slave to the Blues" | Her Georgia Band | 12332 | Twelve-bar blues | C | 5583 | |
| 38 | 2370 | 1925/12 | "Yonder Come the Blues" | Her Georgia Band | 12357 | Non-blues | C | 5583 | |
| 39 | 2371 | 1925/12 | "Titanic Man Blues" | Her Georgia Band | 12374 | Mixture of blues and popular song forms | C | 5583 | Another take on JSP & DOCD |
| 40 | 2372 | 1925/12 | "Chain Gang Blues" | Her Georgia Band | 12338 | Twelve-bar blues | C | 5583 | |
| 41 | 2373 | 1925/12 | "Bessemer Bound Blues" | Her Georgia Jazz Band | 12374 | Twelve-bar blues | C | 5583 | Another take on JSP & DOCD |
| 42 | 2374 | 1925/12 | "Oh My Babe Blues" | Her Georgia Band | 12332 | Non-blues | C | 5583 | |
| 43 | 2375 | 1925/12 | "Wringing and Twisting Blues" | Her Georgia Band | 12338 | Non-blues | C | 5583 | |
| 44 | 2369 | 1925/12 | "Stack O'Lee Blues" | Her Georgia Band | 12357 | Ballad | C | 5583 | |
| 45 | 2448 | 1926/03 | "Broken Hearted Blues" | Her Georgia Band | 12364 | Twelve-bar blues | C | 5583 | Another take on DOCD5625 |
| 46 | 2451 | 1926/03 | "Jealousy Blues" | Her Georgia Band | 12364 | Non-blues | C | 5583 | Another take on DOCD5660 |
| 47 | 2452 | 1926/03 | "Seeking Blues" | Her Georgia Band | 12352 | Mixture of blues and popular song forms | C | 5583 | Another take on JSP & DOCD |
| 48 | 2466 | 1926/03 | "Mountain Jack Blues" | Jimmy Blythe (piano) | 12352 | Twelve-bar blues | C | 5583 | Another take on JSP & DOCD |
| 49 | 2627 | 1926/06 | "Down in the Basement" | Her Georgia Band | 12395 | Non-blues | C | 5583 | |
| 50 | 2628 | 1926/06 | "Sissy Blues" | Her Georgia Band | 12384 | Twelve-bar blues | C | 5583 | |
| 51 | 2629 | 1926/06 | "Broken Soul Blues" | Her Georgia Band | 12384 | Non-blues | C | 5583 | |
| 52 | 2631 | 1926/06 | "Trust No Man" | Lillian Henderson (piano) | 12395 | Non-blues | C | 5583 | |
| 53 | 405 | 1926/11 | "Morning Hour Blues" | Jimmy Blythe (piano); Blind Blake (guitar) | 12455 | Twelve-bar blues | D | 5584 | |
| 54 | 407 | 1926/11 | "Weepin' Woman Blues" | Her Georgia Boys | 12455 | Twelve-bar blues | D | 5584 | |
| 55 | 408 | 1926/11 | "Soon This Morning" | Her Georgia Band | 12438 | Twelve-bar blues | D | 5584 | |
| 56 | 4019 | 1926/12 | "Little Low Mamma Blues" | Blind Blake (guitar) possibly Leroy Picket (violin) | 12419 | Twelve-bar blues | D | 5584 | |
| 57 | 4020 | 1926/12 | "Grievin Hearted Blues" | Blind Blake (guitar) possibly Leroy Picket (violin) | 12419 | Mixture of blues and popular song forms | D | 5584 | |
| 58 | 4021 | 1926/12 | "Don't Fish in My Sea" | Jimmy Blythe (piano) | 12438 | Twelve-bar blues | D | 5584 | |
| 59 | 4082 | 1927/08 | "Big Boy Blues" | Her Georgia Band | 12548 | Twelve-bar blues | D | 5584 | |
| 60 | 4083 | 1927/08 | "Blues Oh Blues" | Her Georgia Band | 12566 | Non-blues | D | 5584 | |
| 61 | 4090 | 1927/08 | "Damper Down Blues" | Her Georgia Band | 12548 | Twelve-bar blues | D | 5584 | |
| 62 | 4091 | 1927/08 | "Gone Daddy Blues" | Her Georgia Band | 12526 | Mixture of blues and popular song forms | D | 5584 | |
| 63 | 4092 | 1927/08 | "Oh Papa Blues" | Her Georgia Band | 12566 | Non-blues | D | 5584 | |
| 64 | 4707 | 1927/08 | "Misery Blues" | Her Georgia Band | 12508 | Non-blues | D | 5584 | |
| 65 | 4708 | 1927/08 | "Dead Drunk Blues" | Her Georgia Band | 12508 | Twelve-bar blues | D | 5584 | |
| 66 | 4709 | 1927/08 | "Slow Driving Moan" | Her Georgia Band | 12526 | Mixture of blues and popular song forms | D | 5584 | |
| 67 | 20228 | 1927/12 | "Blues the World Forgot—Part 1" | Her Georgia Band | 12647 | Comedy | D | 5584 | |
| 68 | 20229 | 1927/12 | "Ma Rainey's Black Bottom" | Her Georgia Band | 12590 | Non-blues | D | 5584 | |
| 69 | 20230 | 1927/12 | "Blues the World Forgot—Part 2" | Her Georgia Band | 12647 | Comedy | D | 5584 | |
| 70 | 20231 | 1927/12 | "Hellish Rag" | Her Georgia Band | 12612 | Non-blues | D | 5584 | |
| 71 | 20232 | 1927/12 | "Georgia Cake Walk" | Her Georgia Band | 12590 | Comedy | D | 5584 | |
| 72 | 20233 | 1927/12 | "New Bo-Weavil Blues" | Her Georgia Band | 12603 | Mixture of blues and popular song forms | D | 5584 | |
| 73 | 20232 | 1927/12 | "Moonshine Blues" | Her Georgia Band | 12603 | Mixture of blues and popular song forms | D | 5584 | |
| 74 | 20233 | 1927/12 | "Ice Bag Papa" | Her Georgia Band | 12612 | Non-blues | D | 5584 | |
| 75 | 20661 | 1928/06 | "Black Cat Hoot Owl Blues" | Her Tub Jug Washboard Band | 12687 | Twelve-bar blues | E | 5156 | Band led by Georgia Tom |
| 76 | 20662 | 1928/06 | "Log Camp Blues" | Her Tub Jug Washboard Band | 12804 | Twelve-bar blues | E | 5156 | Band led by Georgia Tom |
| 77 | 20663 | 1928/06 | "Hear Me Talking to You" | Her Tub Jug Washboard Band | 12668 | Twelve-bar blues | E | 5156 | Band led by Georgia Tom |
| 78 | 20664 | 1928/06 | "Hustlin' Blues" | Her Tub Jug Washboard Band | 12804 | Twelve-bar blues | E | 5156 | Band led by Georgia Tom |
| 79 | 20665 | 1928/06 | "Prove It on Me Blues" | Her Tub Jug Washboard Band | 12668 | Non-blues | E | 5156 | Band led by Georgia Tom |
| 80 | 20666 | 1928/06 | "Victim of the Blues" | Her Tub Jug Washboard Band | 12687 | Twelve-bar blues | E | 5156 | Band led by Georgia Tom |
| 81 | 20667 | 1928/06 | "Traveling Blues" | Her Tub Jug Washboard Band | 12707 | Twelve-bar blues | E | 5156 | Band led by Georgia Tom; another take on JSP and DOCD5216 |
| 82 | 20668 | 1928/06 | "Deep Moaning Blues Blues" | Her Tub Jug Washboard Band | 12707 | Twelve-bar blues | E | 5156 | Band led by Georgia Tom another take on JSP & DOCD |
| 83 | 20878 | 1928/09 | "Daddy Goodbye Blues" | Georgia Tom Dorsey (piano); Tampa Red (guitar) | 12963 | Eight-bar blues | E | 5156 | |
| 84 | 20879 | 1928/09 | "Sleep Talking Blues" | Georgia Tom Dorsey (piano); Tampa Red (guitar) | 12760 | Twelve-bar blues | E | 5156 | Another take on JSP & DOCD |
| 85 | 20880 | 1928/09 | "Tough Luck Blues" | Georgia Tom Dorsey (piano); Tampa Red (guitar) | 12735 | Twelve-bar blues | E | 5156 | |
| 86 | 20881 | 1928/09 | "Blame It on the Blues" | Georgia Tom Dorsey (piano); Tampa Red (guitar) | 12760 | Twelve-bar blues | E | 5156 | |
| 87 | 20882 | 1928/09 | "Sweet Rough Man" | Georgia Tom Dorsey (piano); Tampa Red (guitar) | 12926 | Twelve-bar blues | E | 5156 | |
| 88 | 20883 | 1928/09 | "Runaway Blues" | Georgia Tom Dorsey (piano); Tampa Red (guitar) | 12902 | Twelve-bar blues | E | 5156 | |
| 89 | 20885 | 1928/09 | "Screech Owl Blues" | Eddie Miller (piano) | 12735 | Twelve-bar blues | E | 5156 | |
| 90 | 20886 | 1928/09 | "Black Dust Blues" | Eddie Miller (piano) | 12926 | Twelve-bar blues | E | 5156 | |
| 91 | 20897 | 1928/09 | "Leaving This Morning" | Georgia Tom Dorsey (piano); Tampa Red (guitar) | 12902 | Twelve-bar blues | E | 5156 | |
| 92 | 20898 | 1928/09 | "Black Eye Blues" | Georgia Tom Dorsey (piano); Tampa Red (guitar) | 12963 | Twelve-bar blues | E | 5156 | Another take on JSP & DOCD |
| 93 | 20921 | 1928/10 | "Ma and Pa Poorhouse Blues" | Papa Charlie Jackson (duet & banjo) | 12718 | Twelve-bar blues | E | 5156 | |
| 94 | 20144 | 1928/10 | "Big Feeling Blues" | Papa Charlie Jackson (duet & banjo) | 12718 | Twelve-bar blues | E | 5156 | |

== Notes ==
1. Sources are unclear on the exact date and circumstances under which Rainey and Smith met, but it was probably sometime between 1912 and 1916.
