= The Pruitt Twins =

American musical duo

- Born: April 19, 1894; Bentonville, Arkansas, U.S.
- Origin: Kansas City, Missouri, U.S.
- Died: Millus Pruett: October 13, 1957 (aged 63); Myles Pruett: after 1940
- Genres: Blues
- Years active: 1920s
- Labels: Paramount Records, Gennett Records
- Past members: Millus Pruitt (or Pruett); Myles Pruitt (or Pruett)

The Pruitt Twins were American identical twin brothers, who provided both guitar and banjo accompaniment on a number of blues recordings made in the 1920s. Both musicians were proficient in playing either instrument.

According to researchers Bob Eagle and Eric S. LeBlanc, they were Millus David Pruett [sic] and Myles Pennington Pruett, who were both born on April 19, 1894, in Bentonville, Arkansas, and grew up in Kansas City, Missouri. Myles Pruett, at least, lived in Minneapolis in 1917 before returning to Kansas City, and by 1930 both brothers were living in Oklahoma City. Myles Pruett was married and living in Kansas City in 1933, and was in the same city in 1940.

AllMusic noted in relation to Myles Pruitt that his "... solid guitar work accompanied Kimbrough throughout her career and provided an excellent complement to her vocal style". On Kimbrough's first recording made in March 1924 in Chicago, Illinois, the pair got equal billing on the record label with Kimbrough (who was known as Lottie Beaman at that time); their surname was spelled as Pruett. According to Frank Driggs and Chuck Haddix in their history of Kansas City jazz, "Myles's steady rhythm guitar and Millus's banjo frills embellish Beaman's otherwise plain vocal delivery. Dazzled by the twins' virtuosity, the producer for Paramount pressed them into service for two additional sessions accompanying Ida Cox and Ma Rainey."

The twins supplied accompaniment on four tracks recorded by Ma Rainey in 1924. When "Lost Wandering Blues" and "Dream Blues" were issued on a 10-inch shellac disc 78 rpm single, the record label featured a picture of Rainey, which Paramount claimed was the first time that an image of an artist had appeared on a record label. The label also stated that Rainey was "with two guitar accompaniment by the Pruit Twins" [sic], although most blues scholars agree it was played on a guitar and banjo.

They also worked with Ida Cox, providing musical support on two sides she recorded in 1924 for Paramount Records. By 1928, when Lottie Kimbrough was recording for Gennett Records, Myles Pruitt alone, without the assistance of his twin, probably supplied the guitar backing.

According to Social Security records, Millus David Pruett died on October 13, 1957, at the age of 63. No information is available on the death of his brother Myles.

== Discography ==
Year	Artist	Title	Record label	Guitar	Banjo	Reference
1924	Ma Rainey	"Lost Wandering Blues"	Paramount Records	Millus Pruitt	Myles Pruitt	
1924	Ma Rainey	"Dream Blues"	Paramount Records	Millus Pruitt	Myles Pruitt	
1924	Ma Rainey	"Shave 'Em Dry Blues"	Paramount Records	Millus Pruitt	Myles Pruitt	
1924	Ma Rainey	"Farewell Daddy Blues"	Paramount Records	Millus Pruitt	Myles Pruitt	
1924	Lottie Kimbrough and the Pruitt Twins	"Red River Blues"	Paramount Records	Myles Pruitt	Millus Pruitt	
1924	Lottie Kimbrough and the Pruitt Twins	"Honey Blues"	Paramount Records	Myles Pruitt	Millus Pruitt	
1924	Lottie Kimbrough	"Regular Man Blues"	Paramount Records	Myles Pruitt §	Millus Pruitt §	
1924	Ida Cox	"Mean Lovin' Man Blues"	Paramount Records	Myles Pruitt	Millus Pruitt	
1924	Ida Cox	"Down the Road Bound Blues"	Paramount Records	Myles Pruitt	Millus Pruitt	
1928	Lottie Kimbrough and Winston Holmes	"Lost Lover Blues"	Gennett Records	Myles Pruitt §	–	
1928	Lottie Kimbrough and Winston Holmes	"Wayward Girl Blues"	Gennett Records	Myles Pruitt §	–	
1928	Lottie Kimbrough	"Going Away Blues" ≠	Gennett Records	Myles Pruitt §	–	
1928	Lottie Kimbrough	"Rolling Log Blues" ≠	Gennett Records	Myles Pruitt §	–	

§ = Probably, although detailed information was often lacking at that time
≠ - Re-recorded in 1929
