= Chambers v. Florida =

- Supreme Court of the United States

Argued January 4, 1940 Decided February 12, 1940
- Full case name: Chambers et al. v. State of Florida
- Citations: 309 U.S. 227 (more) 60 S. Ct. 472; 84 L. Ed. 716; 1940 U.S. LEXIS 911

Case history
- Prior: Chambers v. State, 136 Fla. 568, 187 So. 156 (1939); cert. granted, 308 U.S. 541 (1939).

Holding
- Confessions obtained through coercive interrogation, including prolonged questioning of suspects held without any outside contact and without formal charges, are involuntary. The use of such confessions to secure a conviction, violates the Due Process Clause of the Fourteenth Amendment.

Court membership
- Chief Justice Charles E. Hughes Associate Justices James C. McReynolds · Harlan F. Stone; Owen Roberts · Hugo Black; Stanley F. Reed · Felix Frankfurter; William O. Douglas · Frank Murphy

Case opinion
- Majority: Black, joined by Hughes, McReynolds, Stone, Roberts, Reed, Frankfurter, Douglas
- Murphy took no part in the consideration or decision of the case.

Laws applied
- U.S. Const.amend.XIX

Chambers v. Florida, 309 U.S. 227 (1940), was a landmark United States Supreme Court case that addressed the constitutional limits on police interrogation tactics. The court held that confessions obtained through prolonged questioning; where suspects were held without any formal charges and denied contact with counsel, friends or family, was a violation of the Due Process Clause of the Fourteenth Amendment.

== Case background ==
The case arose from the murder of Robert Darsey, around 9 p.m. on May 13, 1933, Darsey a white shopkeeper in what is now Pompano Beach, was leaving his shop for the night, when he was attacked and beaten. He limped to his front door, where he collapsed and died the next morning.

The suspects arrested included Isaiah Chambers, Jack Williamson, Charlie Davis, and Walter Woodard, commonly referred to as "The Pompano Boys". Some of them, including Chambers and Williamson were transported to the Miami Dade jail from the Broward County Jail overnight. Sheriff Walter Clark later testified this was taken in effort to evade mob violence. All four of the defendants were held and questioned for almost a full week; from Sunday May 14, through Saturday May 20, without ever being formally charged of any crime.

They were brought from their cells at the jail one at a time, each interrogated and questioned in a room with up to ten men, including the sheriff, deputies, the prison guard, and white residents of the community.

The defendants did not get the chance to speak with counsel until the morning of their arraignment on Wednesday, May 24, 1933, after they had already signed confessions admitting to the crime. Judge George W. Tedder Sr. found two attorneys, Elbert B. Griffis and W. C. Mather, to represent the Pompano Boys. Griffis, appointed to Davis, and Chambers met them only a half hour before the court proceeding commenced. Both Williamson and Woodard pleaded guilty. Davis pleaded guilty, and later changed his plea. However, against the advice and instruction of attorney Griffis, Chambers refused to enter a guilty plea. Two weeks after the defendants entered their pleas, the trial for Chambers began. After testimony from Sheriff Clark and Chambers regarding their version of events, a jury deliberated for thirty minutes before finding Chambers guilty of murder, sentencing the men to death.

Griffis turned the case over to an African-American Jacksonville lawyer, Daniel Webster Perkins, who filed the first motion to delay the death sentences. He asserted the Pompano Boys had been physically tortured for almost a week straight. The Florida Supreme Court granted the petition to delay the executions. Thereafter Attorney Perkins gave the case to prominent Jacksonville Attorney Simuel McGill who would go on to handle the case for almost another decade.

In his 2025 book Chambers v. Florida and the Criminal Justice Revolution, Richard Brust quotes part of Chambers testimony during the 1936 retrial:

"I told this man what they said was appointed by the court to represent me. I told him that I had not been treated right, I had been forced to say what I said. . . Mr.Griffis, I believe is his name. He denied I had told him anything. The only thing this man told me, he told me to get up there, to just get up before the judge and tell the judge I was guilty, he tried to get me to plead guilty to aiding and abetting, and I told him I didn't want to; and he told me to get up and plead guilty to being an accessory after the fact, and I told him I didn't know what that was, and why would I plead guilty."

In the final state trial for the Pompano Boys, the Florida Supreme Court affirmed the convictions and the death penalty. However, this ruling included a dissent from Justice Armstead Brown. In his dissent he accepted the findings that rejected the defendants allegations of physical torture but concluded that it could not be determined that the defendants entered their pleas voluntarily. Specifically, Justice Brown pointed to the undisputed circumstances of the case; that the defendants were subject to prolonged, repeated and persistent questioning over several days, in conjunction with the defendants being "Young, ignorant, and not possessed of that intelligence or will-power which could enable him to cope successfully with his questioners." Additionally, Justice Brown cited the fact that the defendants were made aware of the looming possibility of mob violence awaiting them outside of the jail.

McGill appealed the case to the Florida Supreme Court four times before successfully petitioning the United States Supreme Court to hear the case. He used Justice Browns dissent in the Florida Supreme Court case in his petition to the supreme court. McGill was joined by Leon A. Ransom of the NAACP National Legal Committee, as counsel in the case before the U.S. Supreme Court. Thurgood Marshall also appeared on the defendants’ brief but did not participate in the courtroom arguments.

== Decision ==
On February 12, 1940, the court unanimously reversed. The opinion of the court was delivered by Justice Hugo Black of Alabama.

In the opinion the court found that that confessions given by the defendants were the product of coercion, and that the use of the confessions to convict the defendants was a violation of the Due Process clause of the Fourteenth Amendment.

The court did not take into account the defendants allegations of physical abuse; instead relying on the undisputed facts of the case: the warrantless arrest, over five days of persistent questioning without formal charges, and the defendants complete isolation from counsel, family, and friends while in police custody. Justice Black wrote that these circumstances were "calculated to break the strongest nerves and the stoutest resistance" He goes on to add that, imposing the death penalty on the defendants based on the confessions obtained "would make of the constitutional requirement of due process of law a meaningless symbol"

In the opinion, Justice Black also criticized what he referred to as "Tyrannical Governments" witnessed in other societies, stating they "had immemorially utilized dictatorial criminal procedure and punishment to make scapegoats of the weak or of helpless political, religious, or racial minorities and those who differed, who would not conform & who resisted tyranny."

The court also rejected the state's argument that the methods employed were necessary for law enforcement to conduct criminal investigations, asserting "The constitution proscribes such lawless means irrespective of the end."

Several of the features of this case, such as not allowing defendants to contact anyone, holding them without formal charges or arraignment, and denying them counsel during questioning were common tactics in law enforcement at the time and were eventually rejected by the court in Miranda v. Arizona (1966).

== Aftermath ==
In subsequent proceedings before the Florida courts, the indictment against the defendants was quashed on the ground that blacks had been arbitrarily and intentionally excluded from the grand jury.

On December 11, 1940, Judge Curtis E. Chillingworth ordered the Pompano Boys to be released. On the day of their release Palm beach county deputies rearrested them, charging them again for the Darsey Murder. On March 11th, 1941 another all white grand jury returned a new indictment to which S.D. McGill appealed, the Florida Supreme Court denied his petition. Williamson and Woodard agreed to plead guilty to second degree murder, however, Judge Chillingworth refused the plea deals, instead entering a directed verdict of acquittal, ruling that no reasonable jury could find the defendants guilty based on the evidence presented.

Isaiah Chambers; the only defendant who never pled guilty through the duration of all of the court proceedings, was diagnosed by authorities at Raiford Prison as suffering from mental illness, he was transferred to the state psychiatric hospital in Chattahoochee where he ultimately died in 1954.

== See also ==
- Brown v. Mississippi (1936)
- List of United States Supreme Court cases

== External links and further reading ==
- Works related to Chambers v. Florida at Wikisource
- Text of Chambers v. Florida, 309 U.S. 227 (1940) is available from: Cornell CourtListener Google Scholar Internet Archive (docket files) Justia Library of Congress
