= Simuel Decatur McGill =

American civil rights attorney

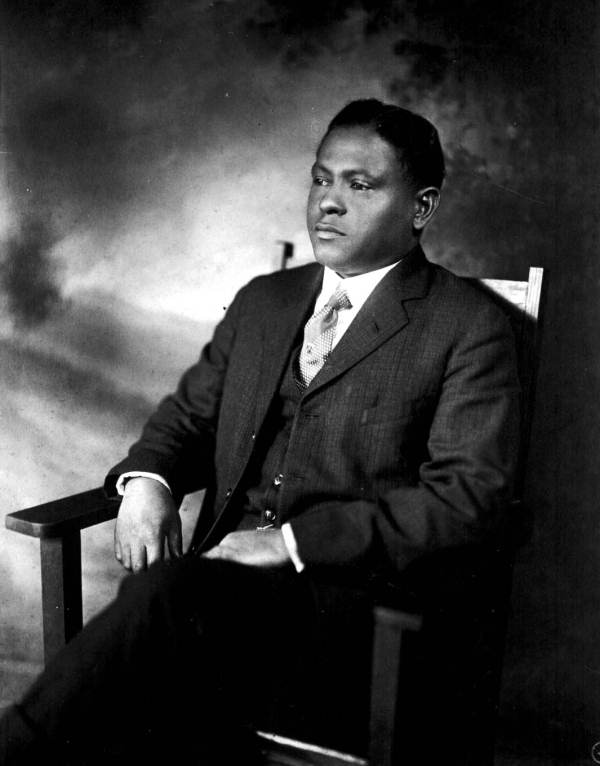
- Simuel McGill
- Born: April 23, 1877; Quincy, Florida
- Died: March 15, 1951 (aged 73); Jacksonville, Florida
- Education: Boston University (degree in law (1907))
- Occupation: Civil Rights Attorney
- Known for: Chambers v. Florida case

Simuel Decatur McGill (April 23, 1877-March 15, 1951) was born in Quincy FL and was an American Civil rights attorney.

McGill was highly regarded, and critically acclaimed for his unconventional and strategic legal methods employed while practicing law in Florida during the Jim Crow era of the south. He is most notably recognized for his involvement in the monumental United States Supreme Court case; Chambers v. Florida widely recognized as a foundational pre-cursor case which laid the groundwork for the subsequent major transformation in the scope of police interrogation permissibility and federal criminal procedure law.

== Early life and education ==
McGill is the older brother of Nathan McGill; During his adolescence he worked in an orange grove.

He attended the The Governor's Academy, a college prep school in Massachusetts, and Edward Waters College in Jacksonville, Florida. He went on to earn his law degree from Boston University in 1907.

== Legal career ==
While in school McGill worked at a law firm under two prominent African-American civil rights activist; James Weldon Johnson and J. Douglas Wetmore.

After earning his law degree, McGill returned to Florida in 1912 and opened his own practice with his brother, where he focused corporate matters and Civil Rights. He was one of the first African Americans to be licensed to practice law in Florida. One of his notable clients being African American lodge of the Knights of Pythias.

One of McGill's first legal successes was in 1915, when he took part in an action for an injunction against the City of Jacksonville in response to a 1.5 million bond that would be allocated for the construction of new schools for white students. McGill advocated for the African-American school to receive a portion of the bond as well. The school board conceded, agreeing to construct a fireproof building of the same quality as the schools white children attended. Additionally, the agreement provided that four more schools serving Black school children would be created. As a result of this agreement came the Stanton School, now known as the Stanton College Prep School, which is still in operation today.

The first case to garner McGill significant notability was his work in a homicide case in 1922. In the case, which arose from a 1922 fatal stabbing by an African-American man; Abe Washington & resulted in Washington being convicted by an all white jury of first degree murder and subsequently sentenced to death by hanging. McGill petitioned the Duval court sentencing on grounds that Florida had abolished the hanging method of death rendering the sentence invalid. Afterwords, FL Governor John W. Martin signed a death warrant for the defendant altering the method of execution to electrocution. McGill then filed another motion asserting that this method was not the judges original penalty leading the county court to nullify the governors death warrant. Governor Martin responded by issuing another death warrant, again, ordering the defendant to be executed by hanging. McGill, in response filed a petition stating that neither method was applicable to Mr.Washington. The Florida Supreme Court ruled against McGill, holding that the relevant statute prescribed punishment as death regardless of the method. In the interim of Mr.Washingtons delayed execution, McGill appealed his original conviction using a writ of error Coram nobis motion, claiming that the Duval County Jury commissioner discriminated against Mr.Washington by purposefully, knowingly and intentionally selecting an all white jury to decide the case. The Florida Supreme Court ruled against McGill stating there was no error in the all white Jury in Washingtons trial. In 1929, a new Florida Governor, Doyle E. Carlton, commuted Washington's sentence from death to life imprisonment. In 1934 Washington was recommended by the prison superintendent for clemency after serving 19 years of his sentence. Ultimately he was released from prison on parole in 1942.

In his book "Chambers v. Florida and the Criminal Justice Revolution" legal historian and scholar Richard Brust discusses & details McGills unconventional method of obtaining victories and favorable outcomes for African American defendants by using appeals and varying strategic legal methods to postpone or delay death sentences.

McGill was recognized for his civil rights work in local Florida communities and in national media, including the Chicago Defender and the Florida Times union.

In "Emancipation: The making of the Black lawyer 1844-1944" Clay Smith Jr. described McGill as one of the most prolific black lawyers of his time, noting that McGill appeared in more state Supreme Court cases than any other black attorney during the period stretching from 1844 to 1944.

== Chambers v. Florida ==
McGill's most significant case bringing national recognition and acclaim was the 1940 United States Supreme Court case Chambers v. Florida. The case involved four men accused of robbery and murder in Pompano Beach Florida, each convicted and sentenced to death.

McGill successfully appealed the case to the United States Supreme Court, where he argued that the convictions were the result of coerced confessions due to official misconduct including improper interrogations, psychological terror, physical violence, and threats.

The United States Supreme Court ruled in favor of the defendants in the Chambers case, overturning the Florida Supreme Court. In an opinion delivered by Justice Hugo Black, the court found that the tactics employed by the officers to obtain guilty confessions were coercive and thus a violation of the Due Process Clause of the Fourteenth Amendment.
