= F. S. Wolcott =

American entertainment businessman and cotton planter (1882–1967)

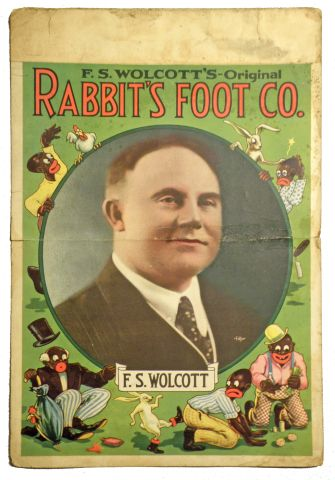
Window card for F. S. Wolcott's Original Rabbit's Foot Co.

Fred Swift Wolcott (May 2, 1882 – July 27, 1967) was an American entertainment businessman and cotton planter who was the owner and manager of the Original Rabbit's Foot Company from 1912 to 1950. He bought the business after the death of its founder Pat Chappelle, and operated the company from Port Gibson, Mississippi, close to his 1,000-acre plantation.

The Rabbit Foot Minstrels or "Foots", as they were colloquially known, made up the leading traveling vaudeville show featuring African-American performers through the first half of the twentieth century. Many leading blues, comedy and jazz entertainers got their start while touring with the company. Under his ownership, it became known as "F. S. Wolcott's Original Rabbit's Foot Company".

== Life ==
Wolcott was born in Onondaga Township, Michigan, and grew up on a farm. He married and moved to the American South, establishing a small touring company, F. S. Wolcott Carnivals, in Columbia, South Carolina. It produced a touring show, "F. S. Wolcott's Fun Factory", in the Carolinas.

In 1912, he bought the Rabbit's Foot Company from Rosa Chappelle, widow of founder Pat Chappelle. Chappelle was an African-American theatre owner in Tampa, Florida, who had founded the business in 1900. Chappelle's vaudeville company was noted as "authentic" (that is, it used all African-American, or black, rather than blackface performers). It was highly popular, and toured widely in the southern states each year.

Wolcott maintained the company, initially as both owner and manager; he also attracted new talent, including blues singer Ida Cox who joined the company in 1913. Wolcott moved the company's base in 1918 to his 1,000-acre Glen Sade Plantation outside Port Gibson, Mississippi. Company offices were located in the center of the trading town.

Wolcott began to refer to the show as a "minstrel show" – a term Chappelle had eschewed. As a major planter and businessman, he became a member of "Port Gibson's privileged white aristocracy". Company member trombonist Leon "Pee Wee" Whittaker, described Wolcott as "a good man" who looked after his performers.

The company became known as "F. S. Wolcott's Original Rabbit's Foot Company", and continued to perform annual tours through the 1920s and 1930s. It played small towns during the week and bigger cities at weekends. In 1943 Wolcott placed an advertisement in Billboard, describing the show as "the Greatest Colored Show on Earth", and seeking "Comedians, Singers, Dancers, Chorus Girls, Novelty Acts and Musicians". He remained its general manager and owner until he sold the company as a going concern in 1950, to Earl Hendren of Erwin, Tennessee.

== Legacy and honors ==
In the early 21st century, a historical marker was placed in Port Gibson near the site of the company's former offices. A 2006 exhibit at the city's cultural arts center celebrated the company, its founder Chappelle and long-term owner/manager Wolcott, and its many notable performers.

== Death ==
Wolcott died in 1967 at The Baptist Hospital in Jackson, Mississippi, aged 85. He is buried at Wintergreen Cemetery in Port Gibson, Mississippi.

== In popular culture ==
The song "The W.S. Walcott Medicine Show", written by Robbie Robertson for The Band, is partially named and inspired by F.S. Wolcott and his traveling show.
