= Blind Joe Mangrum =

American fiddler (1856–1932)

Blind Joe Mangrum (March 29, 1856 – January 13, 1932) was a fiddler who toured as a vaudeville showman and recorded with Victor Records. He recorded with Fred Shriver. He was one of the first stars of Grand Ole Opry. He was the second oldest fiddler to record. He placed high in a Henry Ford sponsored contest.

He was born in Dresden, Tennessee, and grew up in Paducah, Kentucky. He played the Grand Ole Opry. He is noted in an interview of Rube Roland Elrod and Everett Cummins.

== Discography ==
He recorded several duets on Victor Records with Fred Shriver playing the piano accordion.

- "Bill Cheatam" (1928)
- "Bacon and Cabbage" (1928)
- "The Rose Waltz" (1928)
- "Mammoth Cave Waltz" (1928)
- "Cradle Song" (1928)
